= Ford Motor Company of Japan =

Japanese subsidiary company

- Company type: Subsidiary of Ford Motor Company
- Industry: Automotive
- Founded: First incarnation: 1925; Second incarnation: 1974
- Defunct: First incarnation: 1941 (de jure); 1939 (de facto); Second incarnation: 2016
- Fate: First incarnation: Expelled, outbreak of the Pacific War (de jure); Second generation: Withdrawn
- Headquarters: Yokohama, Japan
- Products: Automobiles
- Website: Archived official website at the Wayback Machine (archived December 5, 2017)

Ford Motor Company of Japan Limited was the Japanese subsidiary of the United States–based automaker Ford Motor Company.

== History ==
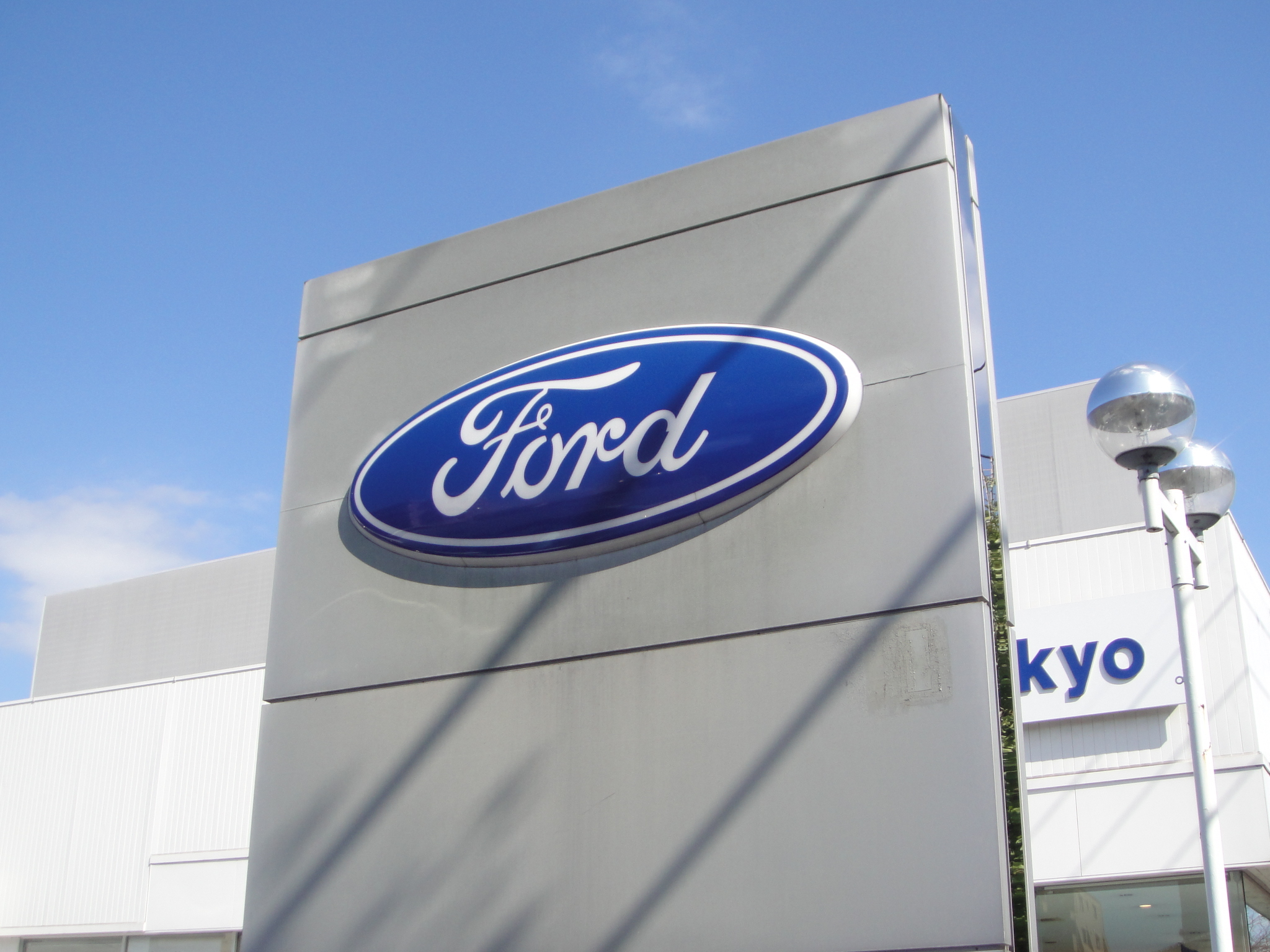
Ford sign in Japan

Since 1917, the first Ford vehicles were sold by Sales & Frazar in Japan, but without trying to build a dealer network. Although the sales department of Ford Japan considered in 1922 due to the inadequate infrastructure as unsuitable for automobiles, was recognized as part of an Asian trip by the Ford Export Manager Russell I. Roberge a potential of the Japanese market.

Ford founded a subsidiary in 1925 in Yokohama. From 1925 to 1935, the Japanese car market was dominated by American manufacturers (alongside Ford since 1926/27 General Motors and since 1930 also Chrysler). In 1930, the combined market share of Ford and General Motors was 95 percent. In addition to a new law in 1936, according to which existing foreign companies were not allowed to increase their annual production, further economic and political factors led to Ford (like other American manufacturers) virtually withdrawing from the Japanese market in 1939.

The Ford brand was formally dissolved in 1941 after the mutual declaration of war by the Japanese government. All attempts to resume operations after the Second World War ended initially failed. Agreements with Nissan or Toyota could not be concluded; also a sale of the plots failed.

In November 1973, Ford Motor Company announced that it will re-enter the Japanese market by establishing a wholly-owned subsidiary. Ford resumed exporting its vehicles to Japan in February 1974 by using Honda’s dealer network, which was known as Honda International Sales Company (HISCO). In addition, vehicles manufactured by Mazda and branded badge engineering have been sold with the Ford logo. At least in the mid-1980s, this approach was a USP for American automotive brands in Japan. A source lists Ford as a manufacturer, but refers to the headquarters of Mazda.

In January 2016, Ford Motor Company announced that it would exit from the Japanese and Indonesian markets at the end of the year because the manufacturer did not consider these sales regions profitable for the foreseeable future.

== Models ==
For their imported cars, Ford had mainly offered models with left-hand drive in Japan (one notable exception being the third-generation Ford Taurus). When the company re-entered Japan in 1974, it began selling its U.S.-made vehicles again, such as the Mustang. Some of the models sold, such as the Ford Escape, were made by Ford Lio Ho Motor in Taiwan.

=== North American-built vehicles ===
- Mustang
- Thunderbird
- Probe
- Taurus
- Explorer

=== European-built vehicles ===
- Mondeo
- Ka
- Focus
- Focus C-MAX
- Fiesta
- Galaxy

=== Japanese-built vehicles (Mazda) ===
- Laser
- Telstar
- Festiva
- Festiva Mini Wagon
- Ixion
- Freda
- Spectron
