= Ford Escape Concept =

The Ford Escape Concept could refer to several different concept cars by the American automotive company Ford Motor Company that previews the production version of the Escape compact crossover SUV by Ford:

- Ford Equator Concept (2005), the 2005 concept car designed by Ford Lio-Ho that previews the first generation Ford Escape (ZC) sold in the Asia-Pacific region.
- Ford Escape Adventure Concept, the 2007 concept car designed by Ford Lio-Ho that previews the first generation Ford Escape (ZD) sold in the Asia-Pacific region.
- Ford Vertrek Concept, the 2011 concept car that previews the third generation Ford Escape or second generation Ford Kuga launched in 2013.
