= Ford New Zealand =

Ford Motor Company of New Zealand Limited
- Type: Limited company, subsidiary of Ford Motor Company
- Industry: Automotive
- Founded: 1936
- Headquarters: The Ford Building, Highbrook, Auckland, New Zealand
- Key people: Andrew Birkic (President and CEO)
- Products: Automobiles
- Parent: Ford Motor Company
- Website: ford.co.nz

Ford Motor Company of New Zealand Limited is the New Zealand subsidiary of Ford. The Ford New Zealand assembly and distribution began in 1936, following the successful representation of Ford's New Zealand business by The Colonial Motor Company (CMC). Ford New Zealand was based in Seaview, Wellington. A second assembly plant was opened in Wiri, Auckland in 1973. Seaview was closed in 1988 and Wiri in 1997. Since then, all of the Ford New Zealand product offerings have been fully imported.

== History ==
The Ford Motor Company of Canada had been established in 1904, to build and to sell the Ford products to the territories that made up the British Empire, including New Zealand. This was a way to avoid the tariffs that existed upon American-made products imported into the nations of the Empire. In turn, Ford of Canada established privately-owned agencies in those various imperial nations to manage the business. In the early-1920s, because the Ford Motor Company had now expanded so significantly overseas; the Ford directors concluded that leaving the assembly and distribution of their products to others outwith the company posed a quality-control risk. Ford of Canada acted first in South Africa, where their appointed agent had not been following Ford guidelines, and an assembly plant and head office was set up in Port Elizabeth. Then looked towards Australia, where it was decided the agency operation was not in Ford's best interests, and an assembly and a manufacturing operation was set up in Geelong; which opened in 1925. But, being so satisfied with the CMC performance in New Zealand territory that it was not until 1936 that Ford of Canada set up in New Zealand. It was the last of their overseas territories to be taken over, and Ford's relationship with CMC continued as that organisation retained and further developed retail Ford outlets. The Ford and CMC relationship has survived to this day, and it makes CMC-owned Ford dealerships amongst the oldest in the world.

Choosing Wellington as the location for the huge new assembly plant made sense, as it is the capital of New Zealand, and the base for most national and international corporations in the country. The prerequisite port was well-developed and good railway and road connections gave good access to and from all parts of the country. A new industrial area was being established in the Hutt Valley and there was abundant space there for expansion. Low-cost housing was being built in the new suburbs nearby to house the workforce.

The "daylight factory" design had evolved over the past 20 years, and it made extensive use of glass for natural light and ventilation. Plants were now built on one level, so as to make use of Ford's moving assembly line methods of production. The neo-classical façade facing Seaview Road also typical of Ford's worldwide image.

Production began in October 1936 before the building was completed. The first cars built were the current 1936 Model 68 V8, which arrived CBD (completely broken-down) in wooden crates shipped from Ford of Canada. These were joined soon after by the British-sourced 10-HP Model C and the 8-HP Model Y. Whilst next years models were released in America in September each year, there was always a lag before they arrived on roads overseas. For instance, it was not until July 1937 that the 1937 Model 78 V8 was released in New Zealand. In September 1937, the British Model C was replaced by the Ford Ten 7W, a revised version of which was known as the E93A, released in New Zealand in March 1939. This was the first car that Ford gave a name to- the Prefect. Similarly, when it was released in the United Kingdom in January 1940 after the outbreak of World War Two, the revised Ford Eight had given the very patriotic name of Anglia - the first Anglias were sold in New Zealand in July 1940.

Upon the outbreak of war, production shifted solely to military use and during World War II, Ford New Zealand produced 10,423 vehicles including Bren Gun Carriers as well as 5.7 million hand grenades and 1.2 million mortar rounds. Postwar civilian car production resumed in 1946 which was also the year of assembly for the Fordson tractor which was introduced in New Zealand. In 1965, a parts depot opened in Auckland leading the transfer of operations from Wellington to Auckland and in 1972, a transmission and chassis manufacturing facility at Wiri, Manukau City. The Auckland assembly plant was also completed in 1972 and began building Falcons the following year. In 1981, an alloy wheel plant was opened at Wiri. By 1987, most operations had been moved from Seaview to Wiri, Auckland and the Seaview plant was closed in 1988 after 52 years of continuous production. Ford New Zealand underwent a major restructuring in 1987–88, including relocation of all operations to Wiri.

Products made by Ford New Zealand up from the early-1950s until the 1980s (with exception of the Falcon/Fairmont range, and low volume American product until the 1960s) were predominantly British. Generations of New Zealanders grew up with Anglias, Escorts, Cortinas, Zephyrs and Zodiacs just as New Zealand's immediately preceding generation grew up with Canadian sourced (for Imperial Preference tariffs) but locally assembled Model-Ts, Model As and Ford V8s. All were successful. Falcons from Australia were very popular, running a close second to Holden right through from the 1960s-1980s.

In common with other countries in the Asia Pacific region, Ford New Zealand marketed the Mazda-based Laser and Telstar, which replaced the British Escort and Cortina in the early-1980s. Unlike Australia, however, the Sierra was assembled and sold locally in New Zealand in the mid-1980s and early-1990s, though generally only available as an estate car.

An estate version of the Telstar was eventually offered in New Zealand, based on Mazda's GV platform – in fact New Zealand was the only country outside Japan where this body style was available. It continued to be marketed locally, along with a saloon version called the Telstar Orion, until 1997.

This sharing of models between Ford and Mazda led to the formation of Vehicle Assemblers of New Zealand (VANZ), a joint venture in which Ford New Zealand held a 74% share. This had followed the closure of Mazda's own assembly plant in Ōtāhuhu in 1987. The Mazda 323 and 626, were assembled alongside the almost identical Ford Laser and Telstar until well into the 1990s. This was in contrast to Australia, where Mazdas were not assembled locally. Ford Australia switched to importing those models from Japan with the closure of its plant in Homebush West, Sydney.

However, neoliberal economic reforms in New Zealand in the late-1980s saw the reduction of import tariffs and a flood of used imports arriving from Japan. Many of these were mechanically identical Mazda Capellas (as the 626 was known in Japan), as well as Ford Telstars and Mondeos. In addition, Australian-built Fords like the Falcon, and its General Motors rival, the Holden Commodore, could now be imported into New Zealand duty-free.

With the demise of local car assembly looking inevitable, VANZ announced it would cease operations in 1997. The alloy wheel plant was sold in 2001. Ford Australia ended manufacturing operations in October 2016.

== Models ==
=== Current Passenger car range ===
Ford Puma
Ford Mustang Mach-E
Ford Mustang
Ford Everest

=== Former Passenger cars ===
Model T (Canada)
Model A (Canada)
Ford V8 (Canada; until 1954)
Ford Model Y (United Kingdom)
Ford Eight (United Kingdom)
Ford Anglia (United Kingdom)
Ford Prefect (United Kingdom)

Ford Festiva
Ford Territory (Australia)
Ford Customline (Canada)
Ford Mustang (USA)

Ford Popular (United Kingdom)
Ford V8 (United Kingdom)
Ford Zephyr (United Kingdom)
Ford Consul (United Kingdom)
Ford Falcon (Australia)
Ford Cortina (United Kingdom)
Ford Escort (United Kingdom)
Ford Sierra (United Kingdom)

=== Current Commercial vehicles as November 2019 ===
Ford Ranger
Ford Transit Custom
Ford Transit Cargo
Ford Tourneo Custom
Ford N-series

=== Former Commercial vehicles ===
Fordson Trucks United Kingdom
Fordson Vans and Light Trucks United Kingdom
Thames Trader United Kingdom
Ford Falcon (Australia)
Ford D-series
