= Ford Freda =

Type of minivan sold in Japan by Ford

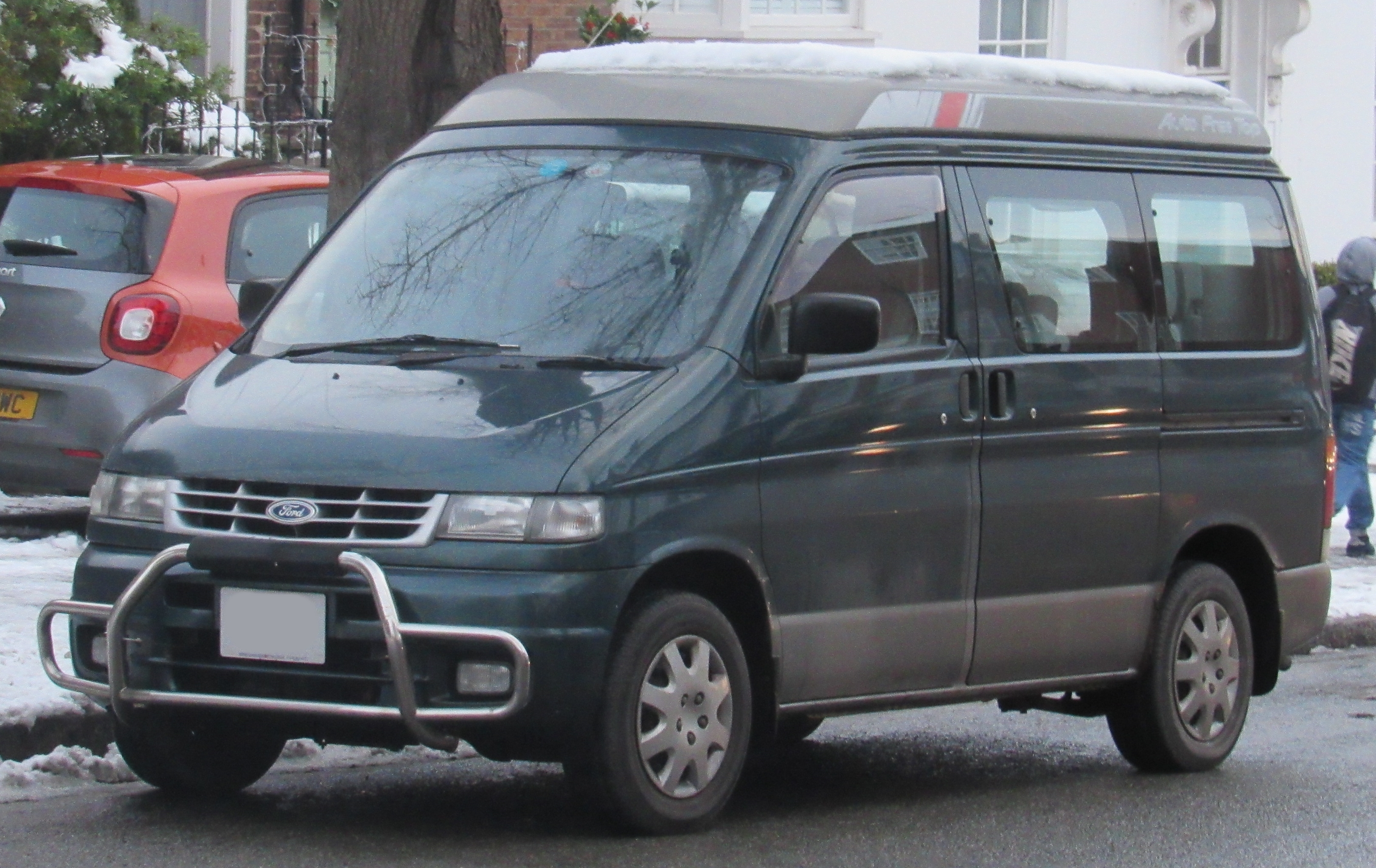
A 1995 Ford Freda in the UK

The Ford Freda was a badge engineered version of the 8-seater Mazda Bongo Friendee minivan, introduced to the Japanese partner home market by U.S. automaker Ford in 1995.

Most examples of this vehicle are automatics (there are a few manual versions) and are available in 2WD (SGL3) and 4WD (SGL5) versions. 2.5 turbodiesels are common in Japan, although V6 petrol engines have existed. Later models (after 1999) have different shapes and engines. Air conditioning (often with climate control) and electronic blinds are fitted as standard.

== Camping versions ==
Some Bongo Friendee/Ford Freda models have Mazda factory-fitted kitchen units, but many others are imported and converted to camper vans in the United Kingdom. All have fold-down seats downstairs to make a double bed, and on many models, there is also an elevating roof where you can sleep two more. Flat-top versions (or "Bongolows") are also available.
