= Ford Lio Ho Motor =

Taiwanese-based automaker

Ford Lio Ho Motor Company, Ltd.

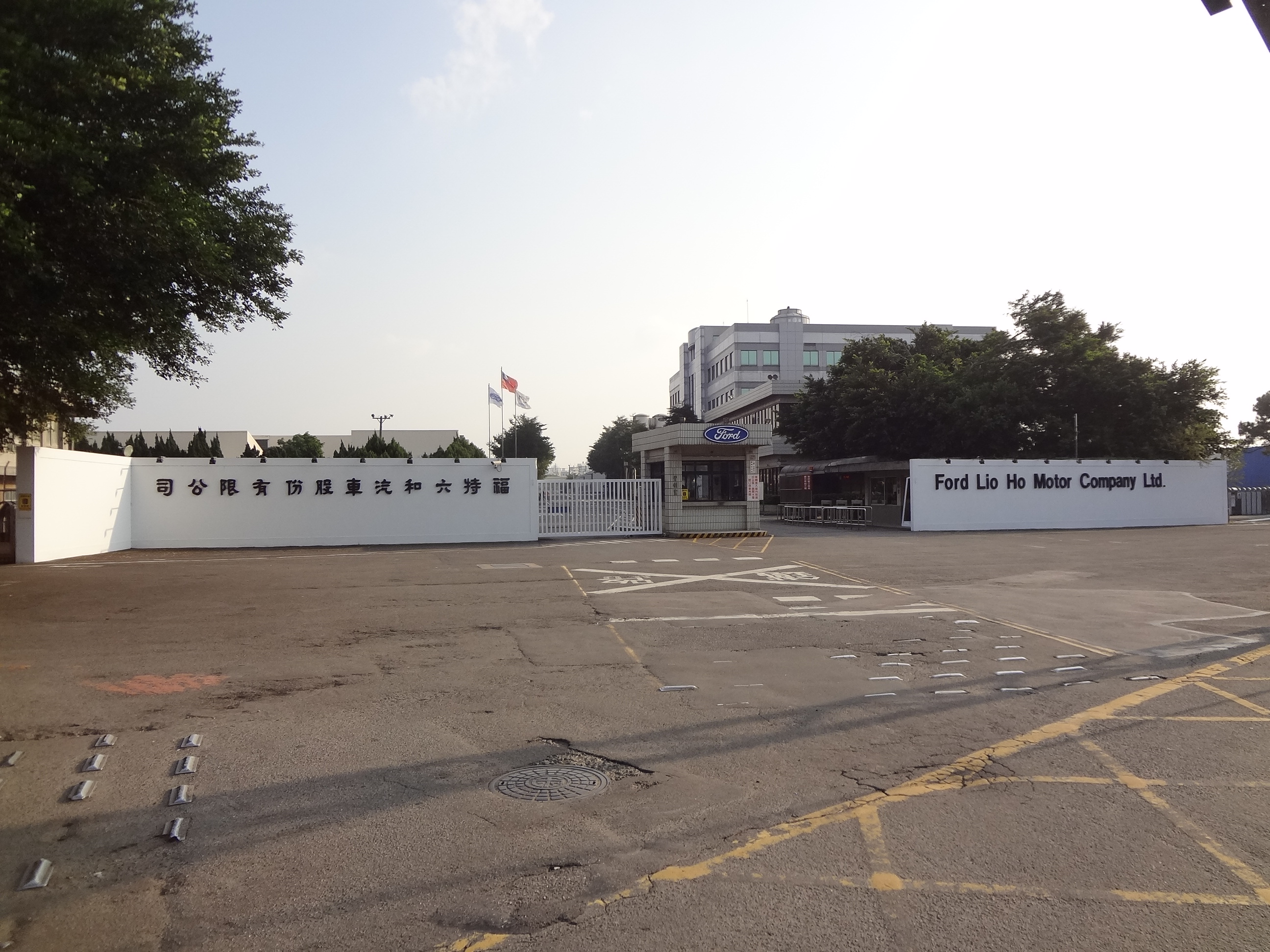
- Ford Lio Ho Motor headquarters as seen in 2013
- Type: Joint venture
- Industry: Automotive
- Founded: 1972; 54 years ago
- Headquarters: Zhongli District, Taoyuan City, Taiwan
- Key people: Chen Wenfang (general manager); Alvin Liu (vice president)
- Products: Automobiles
- Owner: Ford Motor Company (70%); Liou-ho Spinning (30%)
- Website: ford.com.tw

Ford Lio Ho Motor (Chinese: 福特六和汽車) is a Taiwanese-based automaker and the primary dealer of Ford vehicles in Taiwan, formed in 1972. It is 70 percent owned by Ford Motor Company. The remaining 30 per cent is owned by investors in the former Lio Ho Automotive Industrial Corporation, which previously assembled Toyota vehicles.

== History ==
The company began operations in 1973, assembling Ford models including the Cortina, Escort, and Granada. In 1974 assembly of the Philippine-made Ford Fiera AUV began, although sales were slow as it was more expensive than its more comfortable Japanese competitors. In the 1980s, it began assembly of Mazda-based models, such as the Laser (Mazda 323), Telstar (Mazda 626) and Festiva (Mazda 121).

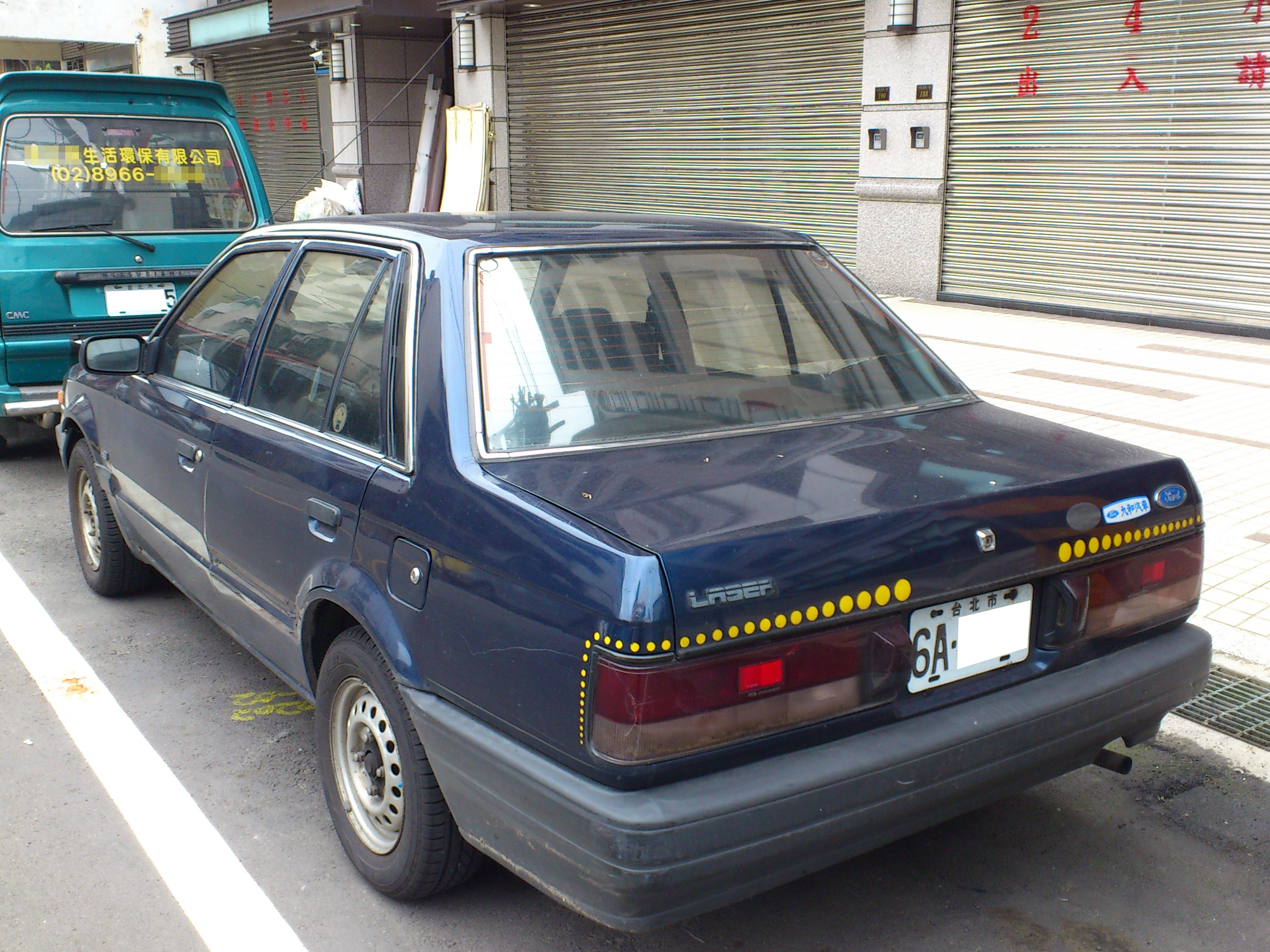
1990s Taiwan Ford Laser Nobel

The Taiwan-built Laser hatchback was exported to Canada in the late 1980s, badged as the Mercury Tracer.

Former Ford models unique to Taiwan include the "Ford Tierra", based on the Mazda 323 sedan, later rebadged as the facelifted Ford Laser in other Asian markets, the "Ford Activa", a rebadged Mazda 323 sedan and hatchback, and the "Ford Mondeo Metrostar" which later also sold in China, based on the European Mondeo sedan.

Taiwan-market Ford and Mazda vehicles include locally assembled Ford Mondeo, Ford Focus, Ford Fiesta, Ford Escape, Mazda3, Mazda5, and Mazda Tribute. Also, all 2007 model year Asia/Pacific (except Chinese and South Korean markets) Ford Escapes are assembled by Ford Lio Ho. The Taiwan-assembled Mondeo is also exported to China and Saudi Arabia. After the ban on diesel-engined passenger cars was lifted in Taiwan in 2004, Ford Lio Ho became the first local manufacturer to build a diesel car. This was a diesel Focus, introduced in August 2007.

Before Ford divested Jaguar and Land Rover in 2008, and significantly reduced share-holding of Mazda in 2010, the Taiwanese units of these brands were organised under Ford Lio Ho.

== Design Technology Centre ==
Ford Lio Ho Motor
- Chinese: 福特六和汽車
Transcriptions
Standard Mandarin
- Hanyu Pinyin: Fútè Liùhé Qìchē
- Tongyong Pinyin: Fútè Liòuhé Cìche
Hakka
- Romanization: Fuk-thi̍t Liuk-fò Hi-chhâ
Southern Min
- Hokkien POJ: Hok-te̍k Lio̍k-hô Khì-chhia

Ford Lio Ho Design Technology Centre or Ford Design & Research Centre was built and established by the end of 2002 in Taipei. The Design Technology Centre was in charge of products sold mainly within the Asian Pacific markets including Australia, New Zealand, Philippines, Thailand, Malaysia, Singapore, Taiwan, United Arab Emirates, Middle East, Saudi Arabia, Japan, China, and Russia.

Noticeable products include the 2005 Ford Equator Concept which later spawned the Asian Pacific Ford Escape (ZC), Ford Tierra, Ford Ixion, Ford Mondeo M2000 facelift, Ford Mondeo Metrostar, Ford Escape ZC extensive facelift, Ford Explorer and Ford i-Max. With the i-Max being one of the latest products designed by Lio Ho, the Design Technology Centre was shut down due to the one Ford strategy.

== Gallery ==
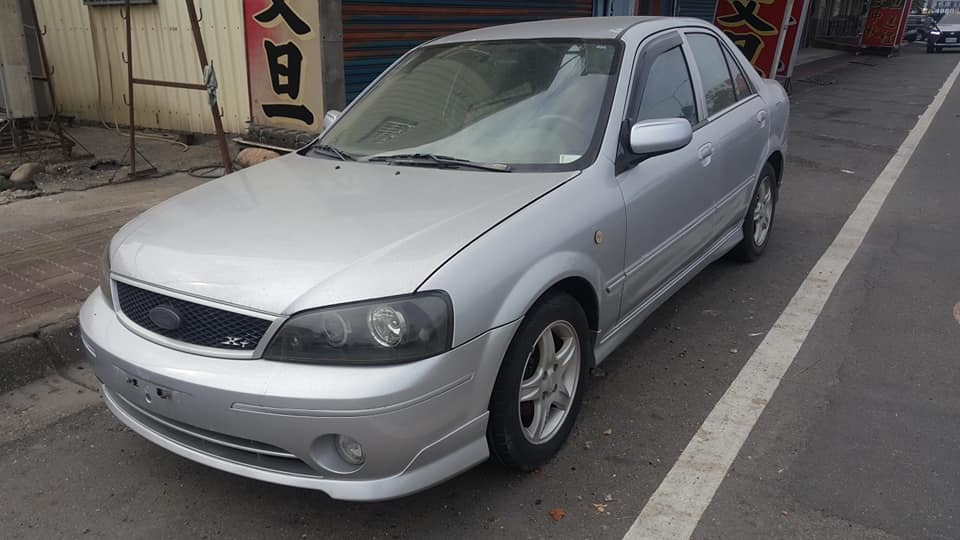
Ford Tierra Aero

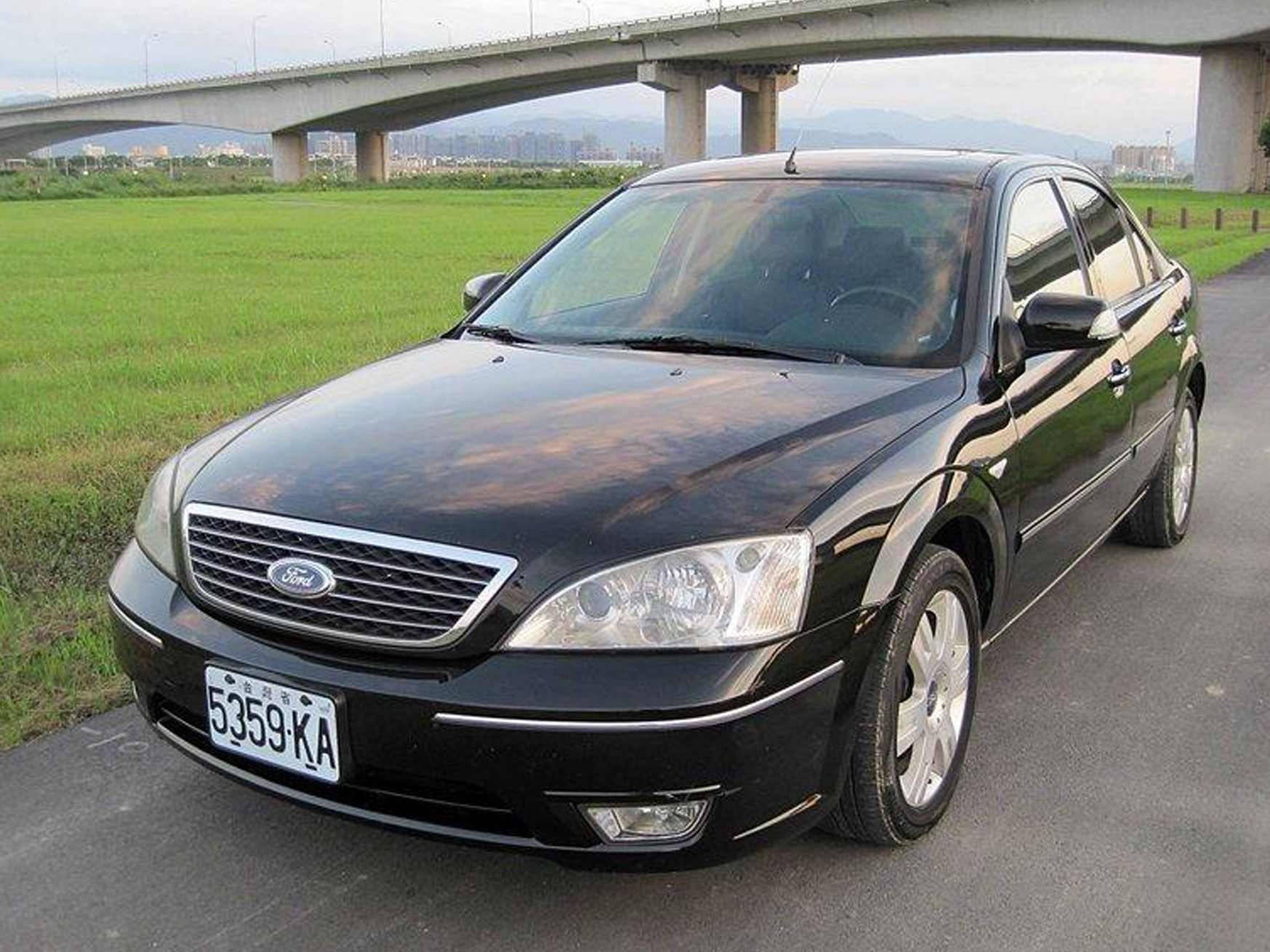
Ford Mondeo Metrostar V6

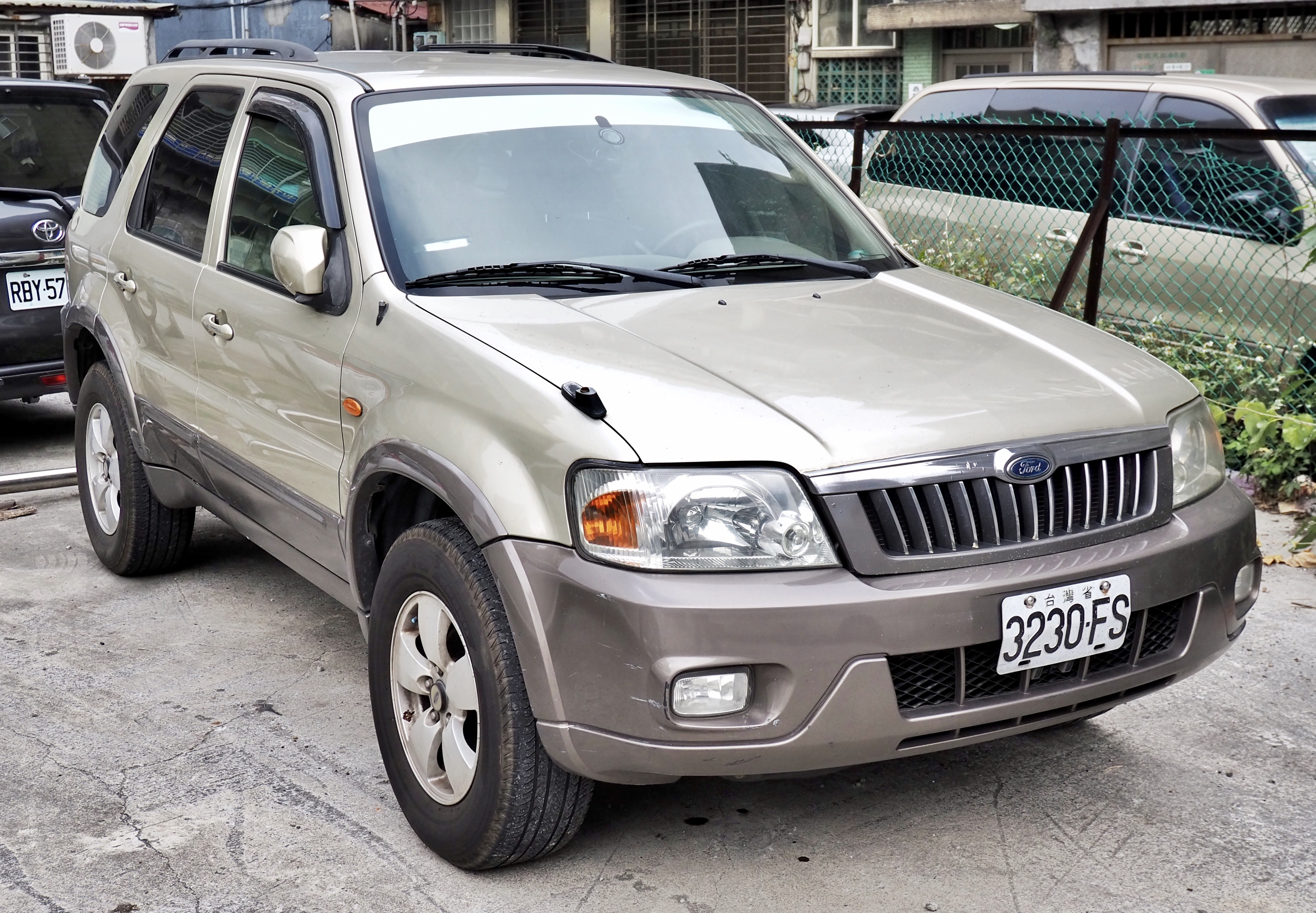
Ford Escape (ZC)

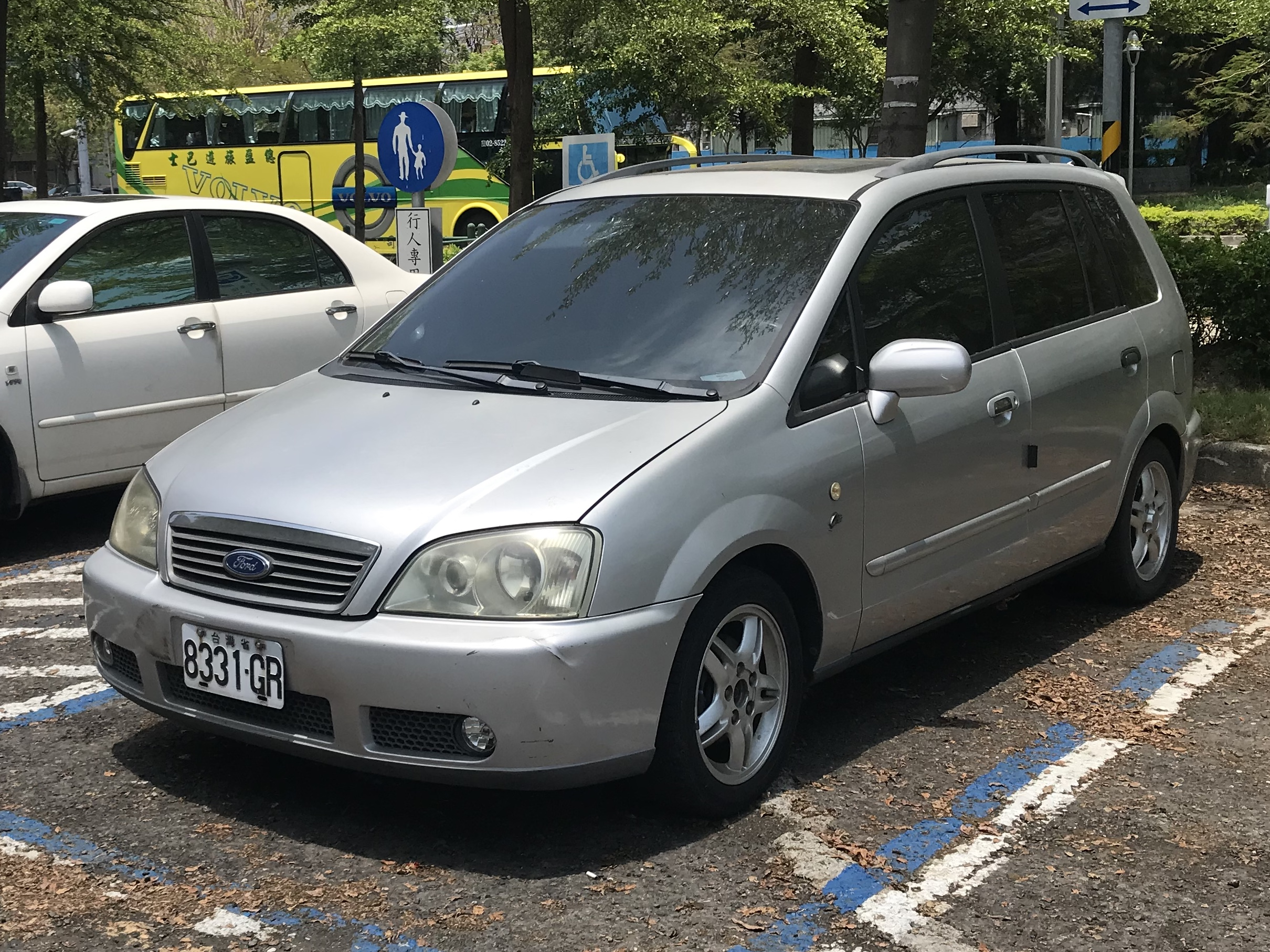
Ford Ixion

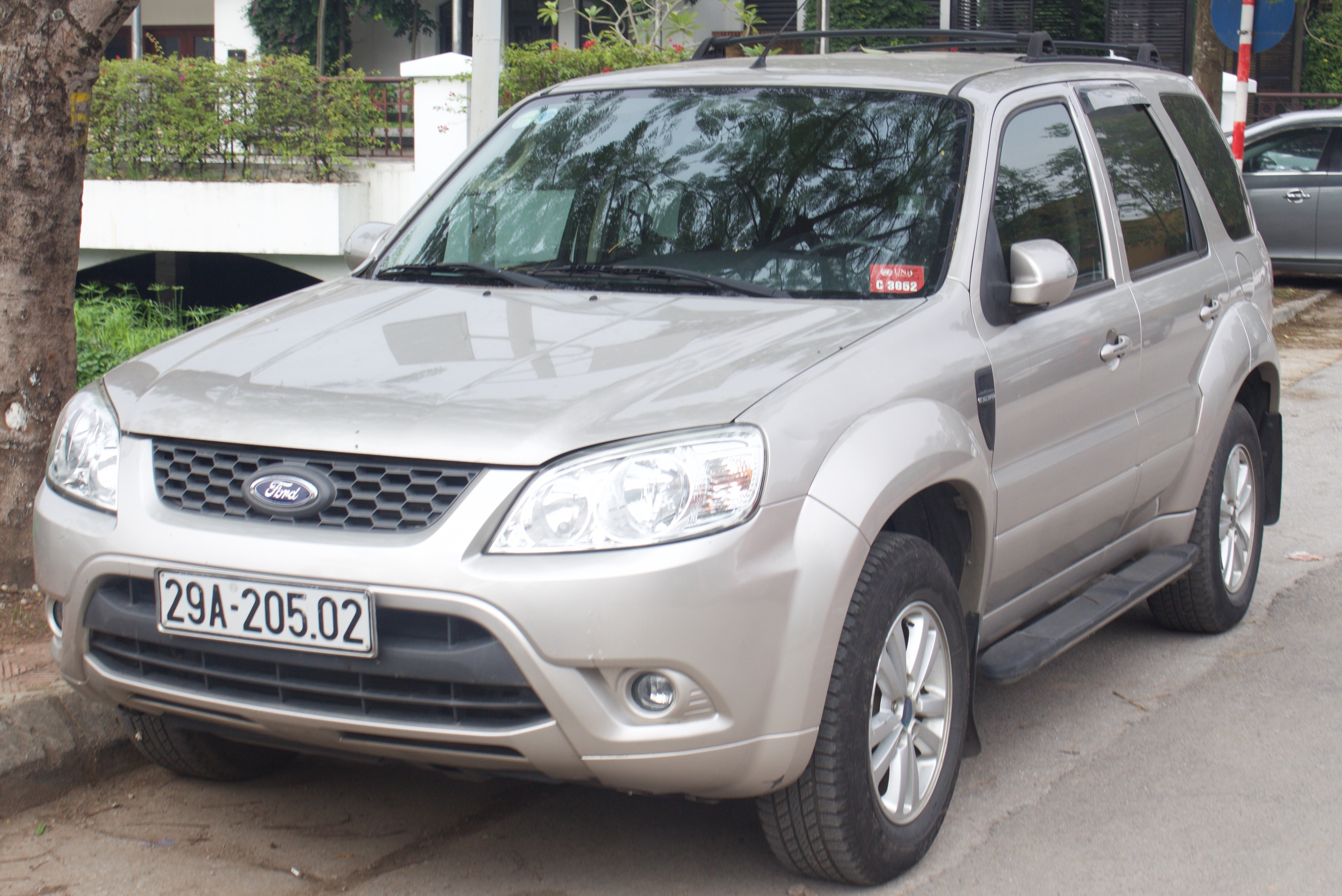
Ford Escape (ZD)

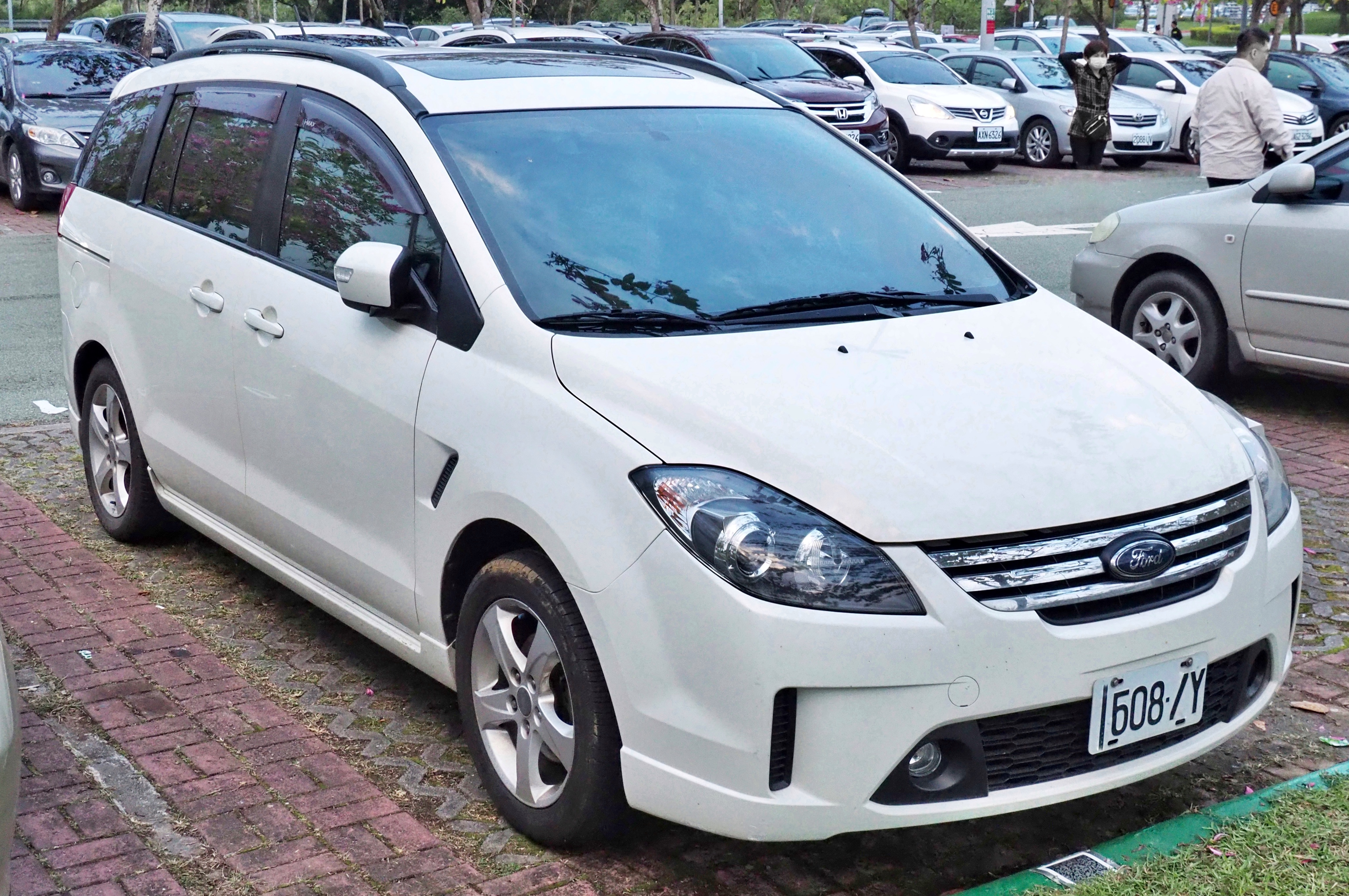
Ford I-Max

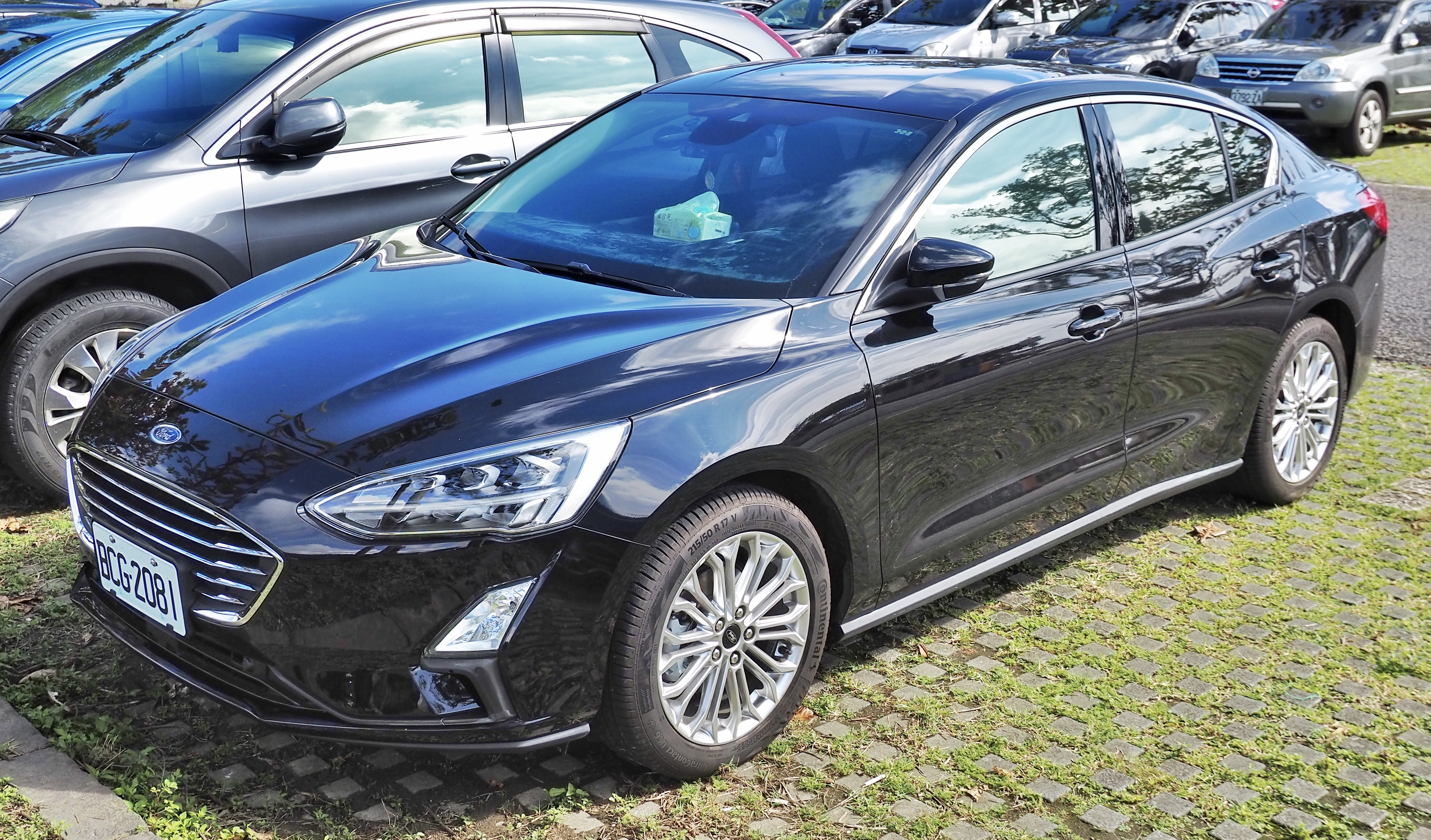
Ford Focus

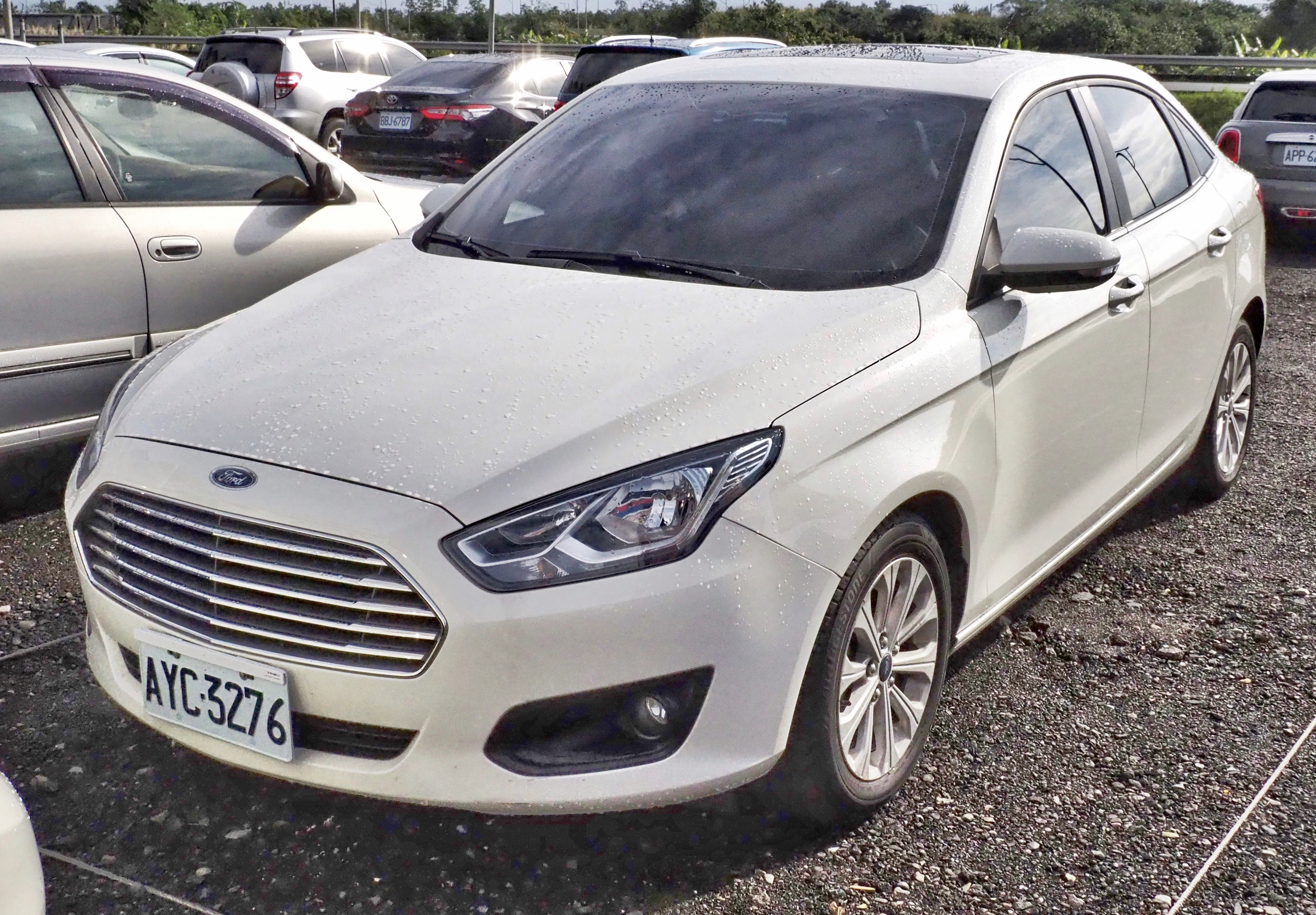
Ford Escort

== See also ==
- List of companies of Taiwan
