= Jaguar X-Type =

Compact executive car manufactured by Jaguar Cars

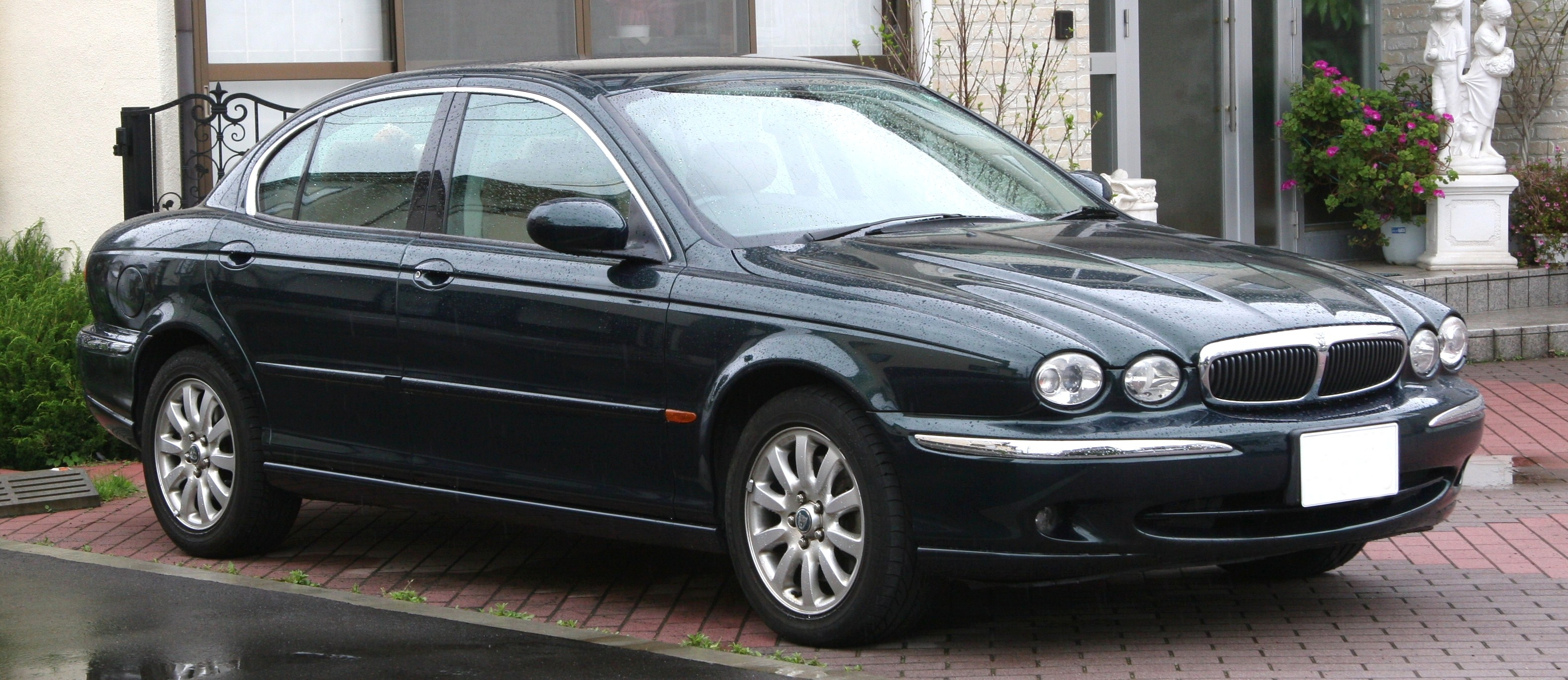

Overview
- Manufacturer: Jaguar Cars
- Model code: X400
- Production: 2001–2009; 355,227 produced
- Model years: 2002–2009
- Assembly: United Kingdom: Halewood (Halewood Body & Assembly)
- Designer: Simon Butterworth, Tadeusz Jelec, Wayne Burgess under the direction of Geoff Lawson (saloon); Ian Callum (estate)

Body and chassis
- Class: Compact executive car (D)
- Body style: 4-door saloon; 5-door estate
- Layout: Front-engine, front-wheel-drive; Front-engine, all-wheel-drive
- Platform: Ford CD132 platform
- Related: Ford Mondeo (second generation)

Powertrain
- Engine: petrol: 2.1 L AJ20 V6; 2.5 L AJ25 V6; 3.0 L AJ30 V6; diesel: 2.0 L ZSD-420 turbo I4; 2.2 L ZSD-422 turbo I4
- Transmission: 5-speed manual MTX-75; 6-speed manual MMT6; 5-speed Jatco FPD automatic; 6-speed Aisin AWTF-80 SC automatic

Dimensions
- Wheelbase: 2,710 mm (106.7 in)
- Length: Saloon (2001–2008): 4,672 mm (183.9 in); Saloon (2008–2009): 4,716 mm (185.7 in); Estate (2004–2009): 4,712 mm (185.5 in)
- Width: 1,788 mm (70.4 in)
- Height: Saloon (2001–2008): 1,392 mm (54.8 in); Saloon (2008–2009): 1,430 mm (56.3 in); Estate (2004–2009): 1,483 mm (58.4 in)

Chronology
- Successor: Jaguar XE

The Jaguar X-Type is a compact executive car that was manufactured and marketed by Jaguar Cars from 2001 to 2009 for a single generation. Internally designated "X400", the X-Type was produced in four-door saloon car and five-door estate car body styles, becoming Jaguar's first estate car to enter series production. The X-Type has a front-mounted engine and either front-wheel drive or all-wheel drive, and was Jaguar's first front-wheel drive car. It was also the first Jaguar with a diesel engine or a four-cylinder engine. The X-Type is considered a large family car by EuroNCAP and a compact car by the United States Environmental Protection Agency.

The X-Type was developed during the period when Jaguar was owned by Ford as a division of its Premier Automotive Group (PAG) (1999–2010) — and marked Jaguar's entry into the critical compact executive segment. The programme aimed to double the marque's worldwide sales — requiring expansion of engineering resources, factory capacity, marketing capability, sales support and service. At launch, Autocar called the X-Type "the most important Jaguar ever".

With annual projections of 100,000 sales, the X-Type recorded a production of 350,000 over its eight-year manufacturing run.

== Overview ==
The X-Type, codenamed X400, launched in 2001 to compete in the compact executive class dominated by the rear-wheel drive BMW 3 Series and Mercedes-Benz C-Class, despite Ford/Jaguar having no directly competitive platform. Instead, the X-type used a modified version of the front-drive Ford CD132 platform shared with the contemporary Ford Mondeo — with the addition of all-wheel drive (marketed as Jaguar Traction or Jaguar Traction 4) and handling and steering engineered to minimise front-wheel drive torque-steer.

Initially, the X-Type was available only with all wheel drive, using a centre differential and a compact, maintenance-free viscous coupling with a default split of 60 per cent torque to the rear wheels, 40 per cent to the front wheels. Under loss of traction front or rear, the coupling could vary the front/rear torque split and could fully transfer torque to either front or rear wheels to ensure grip. For the 2004 model year, the viscous coupling was permanently deleted, removing this mechanical limited-slip function. If equipped, the electronic Dynamic Stability Control System could still reduce individual wheel spin via braking and/or decreasing engine torque.

Despite the X-Type's importance to Jaguar and Ford's Premier Automotive Group, extensive engineering development, significant testing and differing wheelbase and track, as well as body styling from the Ford Mondeo, the X-Type's close relationship to the Mondeo became a point of criticism. In fact, 19% of the X-Type's origins were shared with the Mondeo, much of which were components such as HVAC units, hidden from view.

As Jaguar's first compact executive car since the Jaguar Mark 2 of 1959, the X-Type was the last Jaguar styled under the supervision of Geoff Lawson, with Wayne Burgess and Simon Butterworth as principal designers. The four door saloon launched in 2001, and the five door estate followed in January 2004, with production of both ending in July 2009. The estate offered a Cd of 0.32 in standard form and 0.33 in Sport trim.

Engines included either of two V6 petrol engines: 2.5 litre or 3.0 litre. In 2002, an entry level 2.1-litre V6 front-wheel-drive model was added. All three engines were available with either five-speed automatic or five-speed manual gearboxes. The X-Type grille was slightly modified for both the 2004 and 2006 model years. The base petrol engine was a Jaguar-tweaked Ford Duratec V6 derived from the 2.5-litre that served in the Ford Mondeo, and the 3.0-litre V6 is essentially an adaptation of the engine from the Jaguar S-Type and Lincoln LS.

Jaguar subsequently marketed the X-Type with front-wheel drive and a 2.1-litre petrol or 2.0 Turbo diesel engine. In July 2009, Jaguar announced the end of X-Type production by the end of 2009. Both saloon and estate configurations were manufactured at the Halewood Assembly Facility near Liverpool, renovated at a cost of $450 million.

== Technical ==
The X-Type was based on a modified version of the Ford CD132 platform shared with the Ford Mondeo. The X-Type was initially offered as all-wheel drive only and mated to a 2.5 litre and 3.0 litre AJ-V6 petrol engine. One notable addition to AJ-V6 engine design is the use of variable valve timing. The X-Type's petrol engine is also set apart by the use of SFI fuel injection, four valves per cylinder and featured fracture split forged powder metal connecting rods, plus a one piece cast camshaft, and has direct acting mechanical bucket (DAMB) tappets.

In 2003, the X-Type was also offered in front-wheel drive with the introduction of Jaguar's first four-cylinder diesel engines (based on the Ford Duratorq ZSD unit from the Mondeo and Transit), and with the smaller 2.1 litre petrol V6. The six-speed automatic transmission supplied on the later 2.2-litre diesel models includes Jaguar Sequential Shift.

=== Equipment ===
At the X-Type's launch, standard equipment included automatic climate control; leather upholstery; eight-way power driver's seat; 70/30 split folding rear seats; Sapele wood interior trim; tilt-and-telescope steering wheel; six-speaker, 120-watt AM/FM/CD stereo; power locks; one-touch power windows; a power tilt-and-slide glass sunroof; automatic headlights; and 16-inch alloy wheels. Later trim configurations would introduce carbon fibre dash panels and Alcantara seat surfaces. All interior wood was genuine, manufactured with veneers for the rest of the Jaguar line-up at Browns Lane's Veneer Manufacturing Centre, including the door trim pieces on higher models, increasing the development and production costs.

The estate adds a 320-watt premium Alpine sound system, wood-and-leather steering wheel, 10-way power adjustable seats for driver and front-seat passenger, electrochromic mirrors inside and out, rain-sensing windshield wipers, a programmable garage-door opener, message centre and trip computer, Reverse Park Control, and 17-inch alloy wheels.

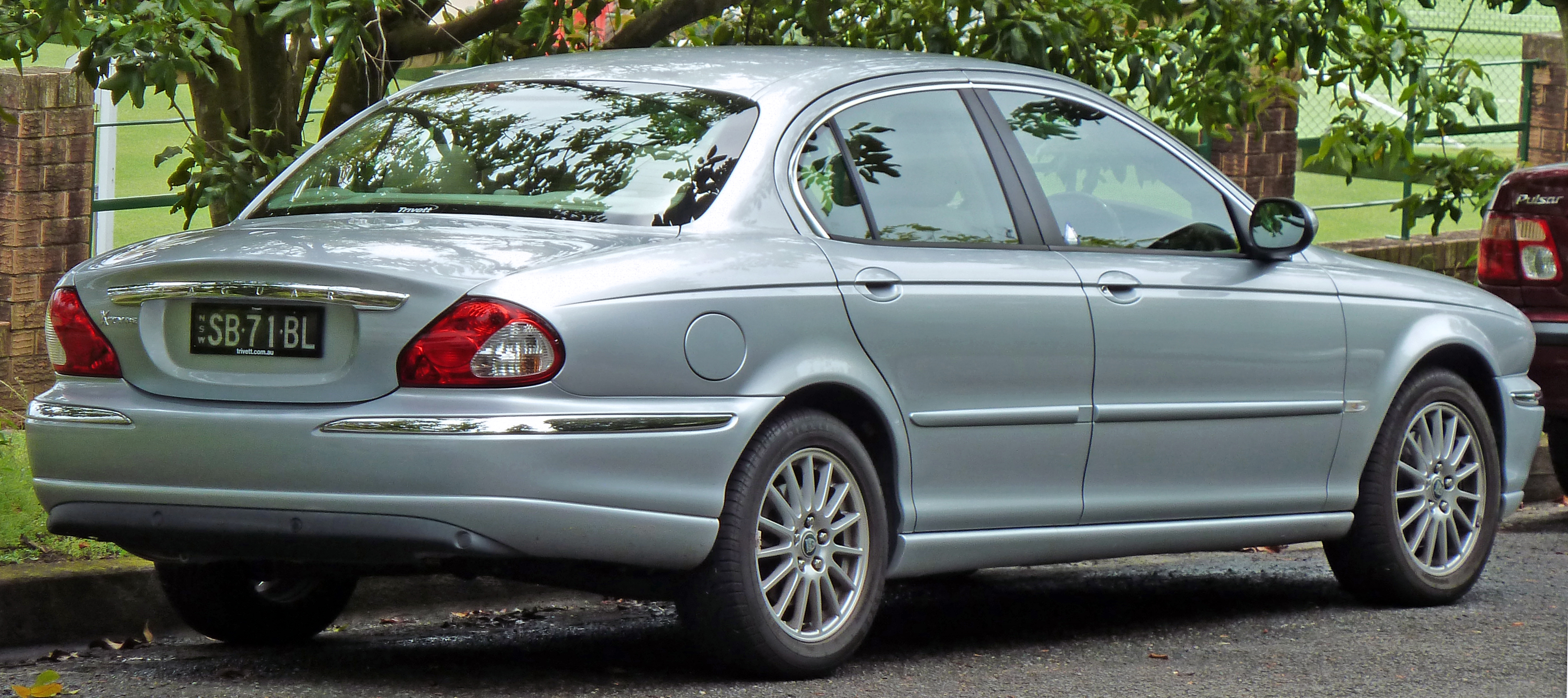

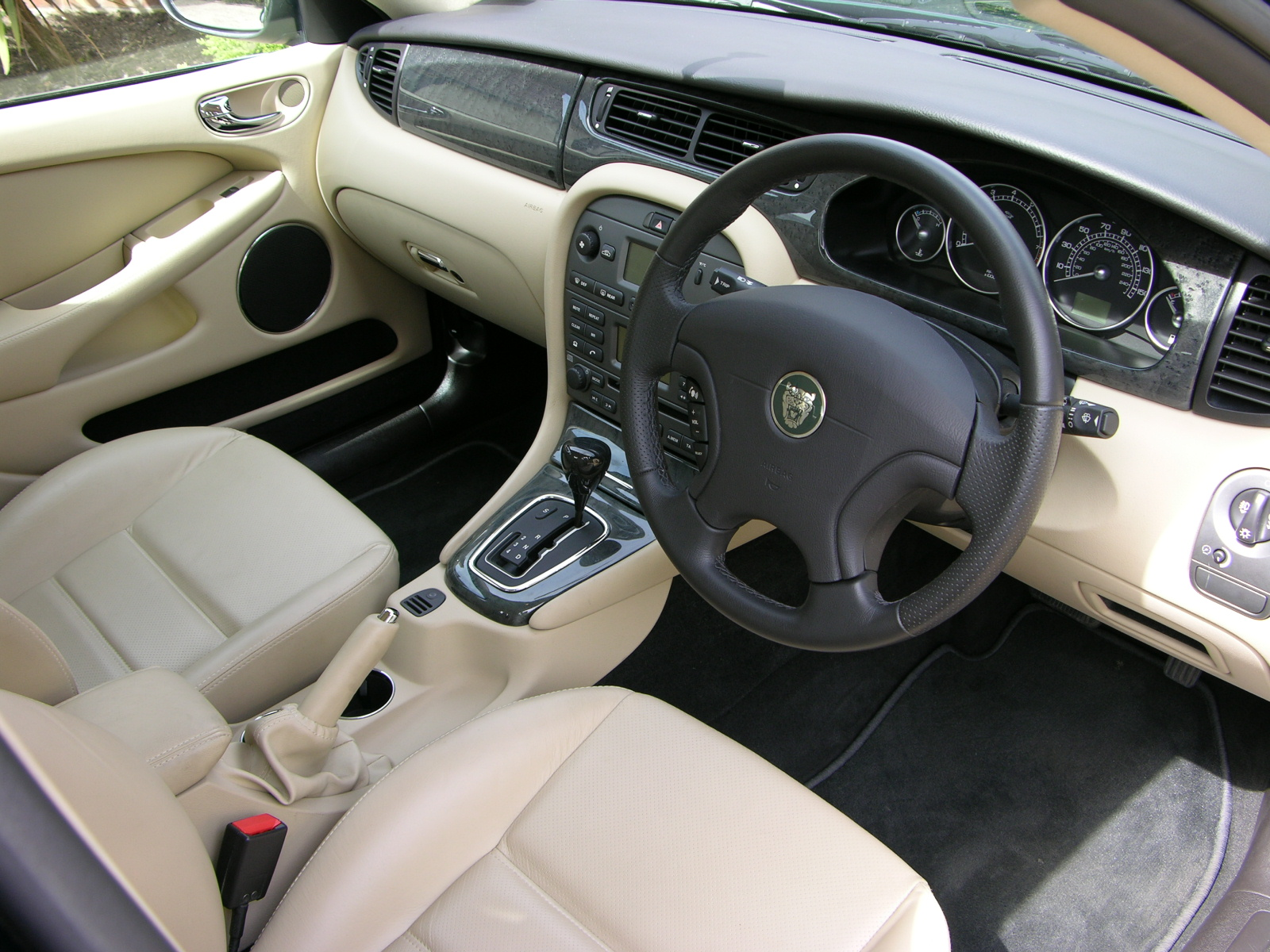

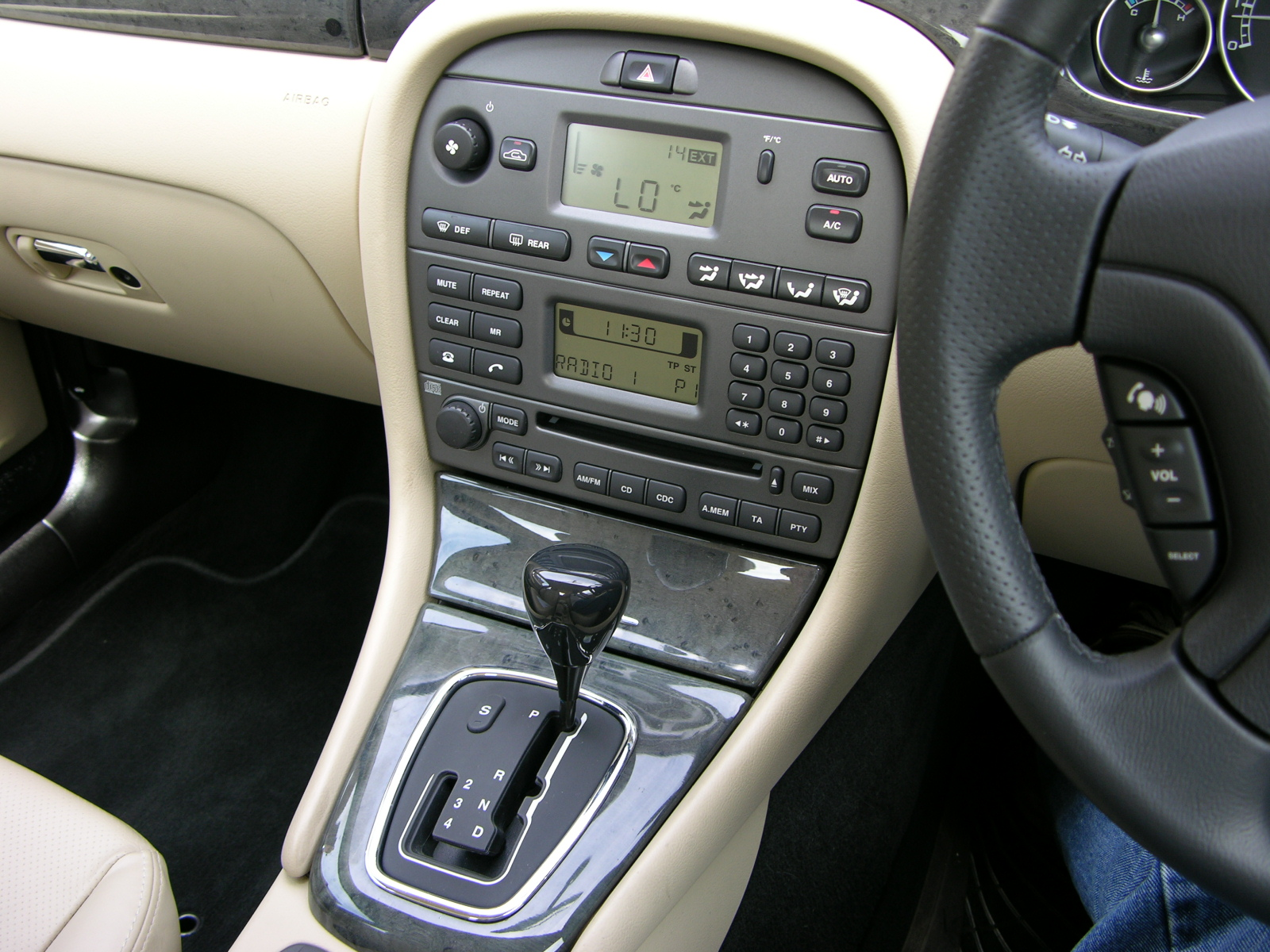

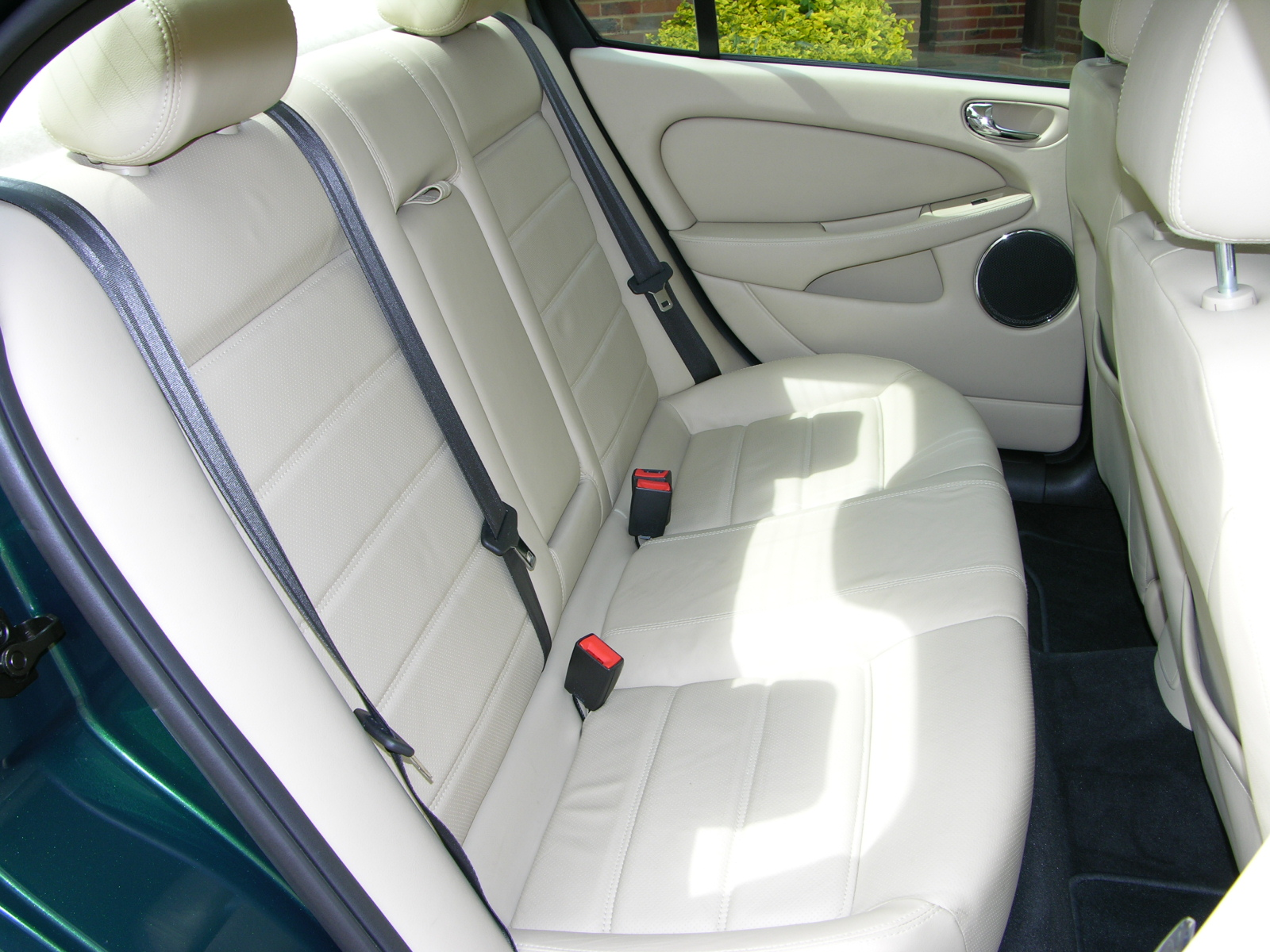

=== Estate ===
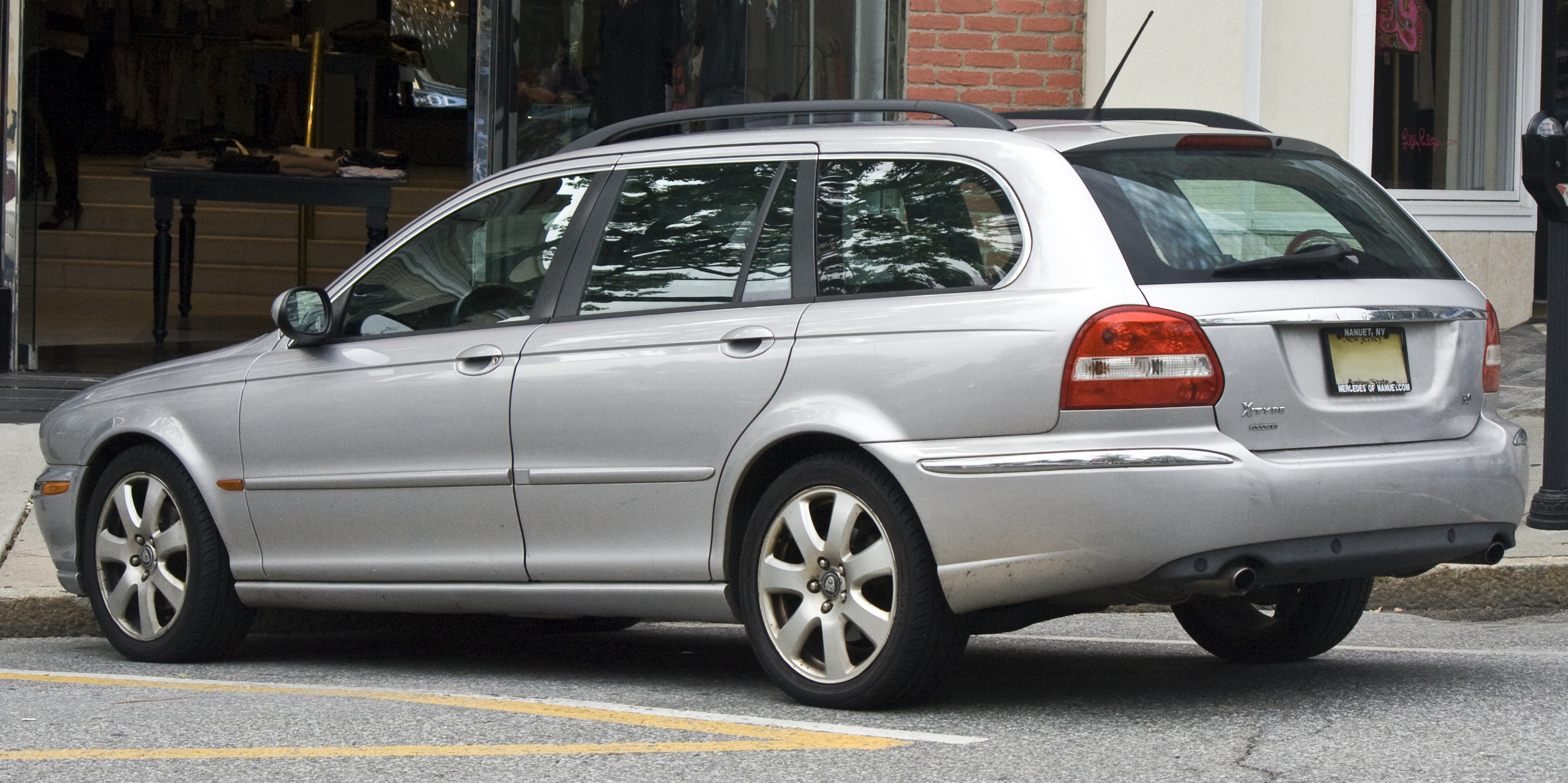
Sportwagon (US market Estate; pre-facelift)

Introduced in 2004, the X-Type estate was the first Jaguar model designed by Ian Callum. From its saloon counterpart, the design revised 420 tooled parts and 58 stampings for all components rearward of the windscreen, adding 150-pounds.

The design used a tailgate with independently-opening, strut-supported rear window, operable by key fob or dashboard located switch; roof-mounted luggage rails in chrome or black; interior luggage tie-downs; removable luggage cover; cargo net and a cargo compartment under the rear floor with a 12-volt power outlet and below that, storage for a full-size spare tyre. The rear seats could be lowered without removing their headrests, and the cargo compartment offered 16 cubic feet up to the side windows or 24 cubic feet to the headliner, with the rear seats up — or a total of 50 cubic feet with the rear seats folded.

The estate was marketed as the Sportwagon in the United States.

=== Facelift ===
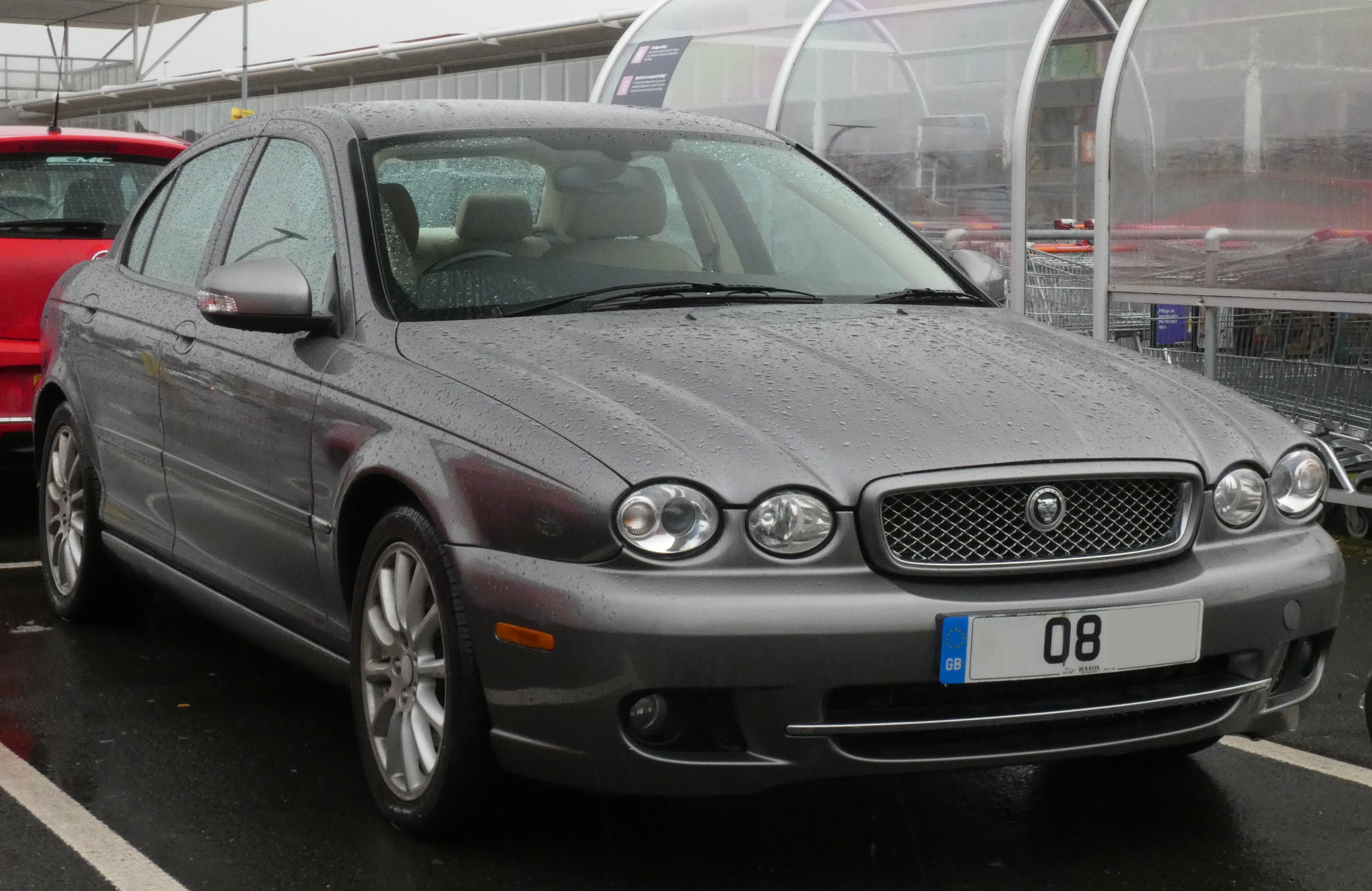
Jaguar X-Type saloon (2008 facelift)

The X-Type facelift debuted at the 2007 Canary Wharf Motorexpo, and went on sale internationally during 2008, with United Kingdom sales from March.

The facelift featured revised front and rear fascias, new door mirrors with integrated turn indicator repeaters, the choice of a 2.2 litre diesel with particulate filter, and a new six speed automatic transmission with Jaguar Sequential Shift. The range continued to offer the 2.0 litre diesel, and two V6 petrol engines; 2.5 and 3.0 litre. In some European markets, the petrol engines were no longer marketed and in the UK the petrol range was gradually trimmed until only a single petrol model remained available for the final model year.

=== Special editions ===
In 2004, the Spirit limited model based on the 2.5 litre V6, featured the 'Sports Collection' pack with new spoilers and rear valance. It was followed in 2005 by the XS limited edition, which continued the sports theme, but available with a wider range of engines.

=== Engines ===
Model	Years	Displacement	Bore x Stroke	Power at rpm	Torque at rpm	Transmission
2.1-litre V6 petrol	2001–2007	2,099 cc (128.1 cu in) V6	81.65 mm × 66.84 mm (3.21 in × 2.63 in)	157 PS (115 kW; 155 hp)	201 N⋅m (148 lbf⋅ft)	5-speed manual
2.1-litre V6 petrol	2007–2008	2,099 cc (128.1 cu in) V6	81.65 mm × 66.84 mm (3.21 in × 2.63 in)	156 PS (115 kW; 154 hp) at 6,800	196 N⋅m (145 lbf⋅ft) at 4,100	5-speed manual, 5-speed automatic
2.5-litre V6 petrol	2001–2009	2,495 cc (152.3 cu in) V6	81.6 mm × 79.5 mm (3.21 in × 3.13 in)	196 PS (144 kW; 193 hp) at 6,800	244 N⋅m (180 lbf⋅ft) at 3,000	5-speed manual, 5-speed automatic
3.0-litre V6 petrol	2001–2009	2,967 cc (181.1 cu in) V6	89.0 mm × 79.5 mm (3.50 in × 3.13 in)	231 PS (170 kW; 228 hp) at 6,800	279.3 N⋅m (206 lbf⋅ft) at 3,000	5-speed manual, 5-speed automatic
2.0-litre diesel	2003–2007	1,998 cc (121.9 cu in) I4	86 mm × 86 mm (3.4 in × 3.4 in)	128 PS (94 kW; 126 hp) at 3,800	331 N⋅m (244 lbf⋅ft) at 1,800	5-speed manual
2.0-litre diesel	2007–2009	1,998 cc (121.9 cu in) I4	86 mm × 86 mm (3.4 in × 3.4 in)	130 PS (96 kW; 128 hp) at 3,800	330 N⋅m (243 lbf⋅ft) at 1,800	5-speed manual
2.2-litre diesel	2003–2007	2,198 cc (134.1 cu in) I4	86 mm × 94.6 mm (3.39 in × 3.72 in)	152 PS (112 kW; 150 hp) at 3,500	366 N⋅m (270 lbf⋅ft) at 1,800	6-speed manual
2.2-litre diesel	2007–2009	2,198 cc (134.1 cu in) I4	86 mm × 94.6 mm (3.39 in × 3.72 in)	155 PS (114 kW; 153 hp) at 3,500	360 N⋅m (266 lbf⋅ft) at 1,800	6-speed manual
2.2-litre diesel DPF	2007–2009	2,198 cc (134.1 cu in) I4	86 mm × 94.6 mm (3.39 in × 3.72 in)	145 PS (107 kW; 143 hp) at 3,500	360 N⋅m (266 lbf⋅ft) at 1,800	6-speed manual, 6-speed automatic

== Safety and security ==
Euro NCAP's crash test found that the doors could still be opened after a frontal impact and that the car offered good protection for children sitting in the back during crashes, however they also found that the airbag failed to prevent the driver's head from hitting the steering wheel and described its pedestrian impact performance as "dire", noting that seventeen of the eighteen impact locations they tested on the car offered no protection for a pedestrian from injury.

Euro NCAP 2002 X-Type	Points	Rating
Adult Occupant:	26 out of 36	4/5 stars
Pedestrian Impact:	2 out of 36	1/4 stars

ANCAP 2010 X-Type	Points	Rating
Overall Score:	26.40 out of 37	4/5 stars
Offset Impact:	10.40 out of 16	
Side Impact:	14.10 out of 16	
Pole Impact:	2 out of 2	
Bonus Points:	0 out of 3	

NHTSA 2004 X-Type	Rating
Frontal Driver:	4/5 stars
Frontal Passenger:	4/5 stars
Side Driver:	4/5 stars
Side Passenger:	4/5 stars
Rollover 4WD:	(10.5%)

The X-Type was tested by Thatcham's New Vehicle Security Ratings (NVSR) organisation.

X-Type	Rating
Theft of car:	5/5 stars
Theft from car:	4/5 stars

== Sales and reception ==
In November 2000, managing director Jonathan Browning said Jaguar's objective was to achieve annual sales of 100,000 with the car, partly by taking market share from established German rivals and partly by expanding the market segment in Jaguar's key markets. The X-Type was Jaguar's best selling model during almost all its production run, but sales did not meet projections, peaking at 50,000 in 2003. In the United States, the car's primary market, sales dropped from 21,542 in 2004 to 10,941 in 2005. In the same year, Audi sold 48,922 A4s, BMW sold 106,950 3 Series, and Mercedes-Benz sold 60,658 C-Class.

The X-Type's sharing of a modified Ford Mondeo platform, which was shared with the Land Rover Freelander, a small offroader that was also produced at Halewood, became a point of criticism. Notably, the Volkswagen Passat shared its platform with its compact executive class rival, the B5 Audi A4. The X-Type's limited powertrain choices affected its initial press reception. Initially, the X-Type was only available with six cylinder petrol engines, coupled to an all-wheel drive system, resulting in poor fuel economy, while its key German rivals, the BMW 3 Series, Audi A4, and Mercedes C-Class were sold predominantly in two wheel drive form, with four cylinder petrol or diesel engines, a critical offering in the economy conscious European market. A four-cylinder diesel option (only available with front wheel drive) was not offered in the X-Type until two years after its launch.

Jeremy Clarkson, then of BBC's Top Gear, lauded the X-Type, especially the 4x4 and sport versions. In two episodes, he demonstrated its capabilities in the snow, declaring that it "laughs in the face of the weatherman, the police and the AA, with their advice to stay at home". With regards to the sharing of the Ford Mondeo platform, Clarkson states that this should not put you off, stating that "genetically you are 98% identical to a halibut, but it's the 2% that makes the difference".

Other car magazine and website reviews were largely positive for the X-Type, especially during its introduction. The X-Type used only 19% of Ford Mondeo's components, while a variety of Ford platforms, engines and components were being used by all models of the Ford Motor Company's luxury brands in that period, namely Aston Martin, Jaguar and Lincoln. In January 2008, Jaguar director of design Ian Callum said that the X-Type "was essentially designed in Detroit and presented as close as a fait accompli to reluctant designers and engineers at Jaguar's Whitley design centre."

Noted automotive designer Robert Cumberford called the X-Type's styling "an unimaginable pastiche of many past Jaguars" in the June 2001 issue of Car and Driver magazine. Overall, due to poor sales, Jaguar lost €4,690 per vehicle produced.

== Reviews ==
- The AA
  Likes: Elegant yet contemporary looks, silky smooth driving experience, petrol engines provide suitable soundtrack, high specification level as standard.
  Gripes: Non AWD models less fun to drive, smallish load area with all seats in place, rear seats do not fold completely flat, body-coloured grilles of Sport models spoil looks.
- Auto Express
  'Ride, handling and grip are good, finding a fine balance between comfort and sporting ability, cabin is unmistakably Jaguar.'
  'Traditional look and feel ... it's not the most spacious car in its class.'
- Auto Trader
  'The Jaguar X-Type is the only luxury saloon in its class, according to its makers. And while owners of bona fide luxury cars may scoff, the X-Type has all the right ingredients: heritage, comfort and sartorial elegance.'
- CAR
  'A bit of traditional Jag dynamic sensations and half-decent value will tempt some, but no amount of exterior tweaking can hide why the X-type missed its target.'
- Driving
  Good - Tempting prices, comfort & kit levels, dynamics.
  Not So Good - High running costs of petrol models, patchy reliability, old-fashioned styling.
- Honest John
  Positives: Compact Jaguar, smart looks and roomy load bay, V6s are four-wheel drive, diesels are quite frugal.
  Negatives: Not recommended for towing, uneven tyre wear on AWD V6 cars.
- Parker's
  Pros: Very comfortable and refined, sophisticated image, decent handling, decent boot space, good long distance cruiser.
  Cons: Traditional styling, cramped rear space, limited engine range, some cheap interior trim.
- RAC
  'This is a car that has layers, textures and subtleties to its talents, a Jaguar that needs no preamble. It's up there with the best in the class. Just don't expect a bargain.'
- Verdict On Cars
  'Average. Jag's supposed rival to the BMW 3 Series and Mercedes C-Class is fading fast. It's still a good car, but doubts as to whether it deserves the badge are growing.'
- What Car?
  'Low prices and a good drive make it a real alternative to a BMW 3 Series. [The Estate] drives just as well as the saloon version, but gives more practicality.'
- Wise Buyer's
  'X-Type is sporty to drive and very comfortable, plus it has that charismatic Jaguar badge. But it's up against some fine executive cars. It majors on value for money and performance.'
- Time magazine (unrated)
  '[I]n its attempt to turn the front-drive compact car into an “all-wheel drive” sports sedan, Jaguar ran smack into the limits of platform engineering. The result was the English version of the Cadillac Cimarron, a tarted-up insult to a once-proud marque and a financial disaster for the company.'

=== Awards ===
The Jaguar X-Type won AutoWeek's Editors Choice Award as the Most Significant Car at the Geneva Motor Show of 2001.

== Replacement ==
In January 2011, Jaguar said plans for successor for the X-Type were under consideration, to compete with models such as the BMW 3 Series, and to be positioned below the current XF.

The project, codenamed X760, was set to be launched in 2015. In March 2014, Jaguar confirmed that the X-Type's replacement would be named the Jaguar XE.
