= Ford CDW27 platform =

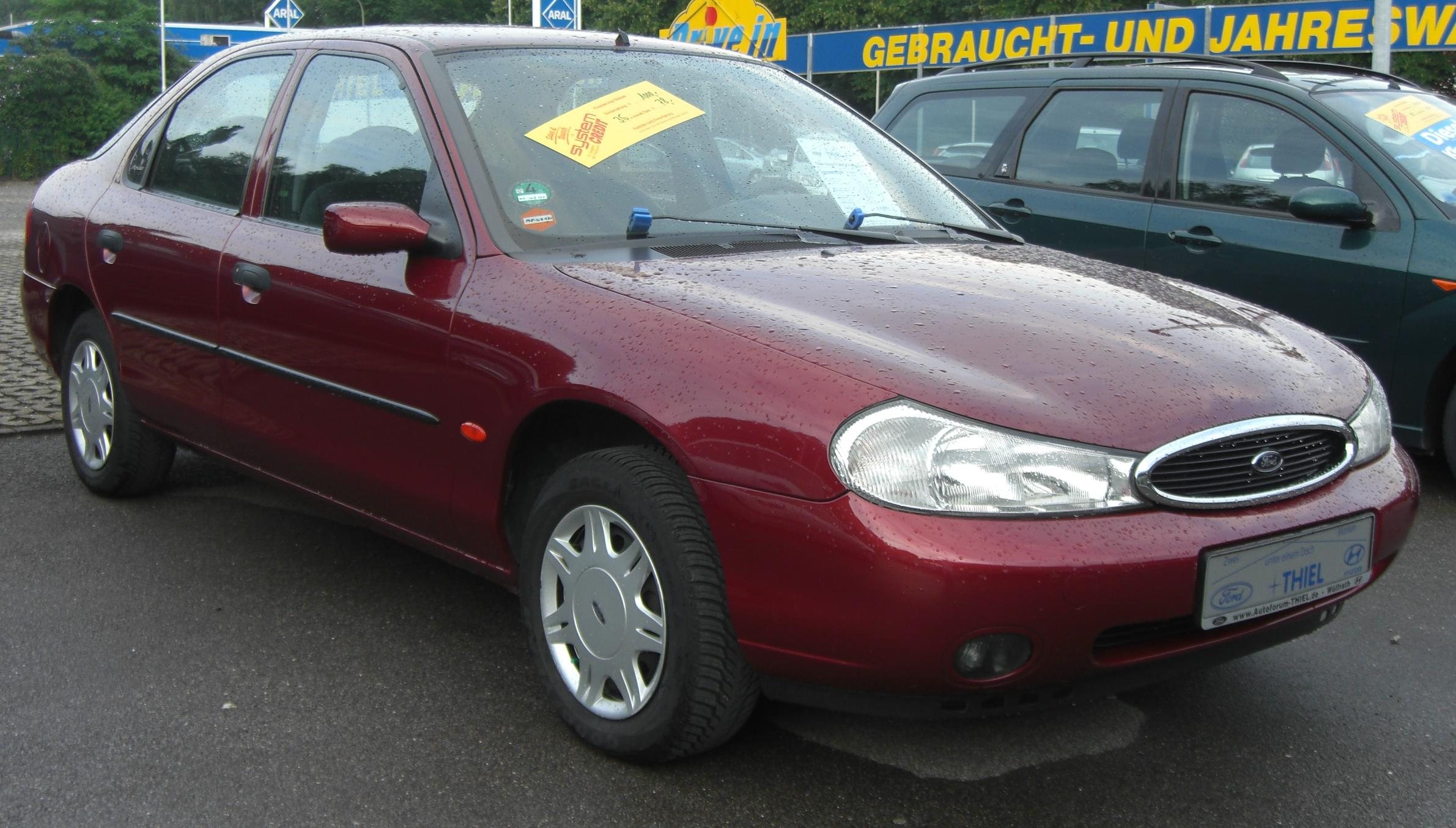

Overview
- Manufacturer: Ford Motor Company
- Also called: Ford 'World Car' platform (1993–2000); Ford CD162 (1996–2000, outside North America); Ford CD132 (2000–2009, outside North America)
- Production: 1993–2009

Body and chassis
- Class: Compact (C/D) platform
- Related: Mazda GE platform

Chronology
- Predecessor: Ford DE-1 platform Ford CD14 platform (Tempo/Topaz)
- Successor: Ford CD3 platform Ford EUCD platform

The Ford CDW27 platform is a since-retired automotive platform designed and used by Ford in worldwide markets for 1993-2007. Used for midsize cars, the CDW27 architecture was a "world car" (co-designed by Ford and Mazda), becoming the second Ford world car (after the 1980 Ford Escort).

The CDW architecture was developed over six years, costing $6 billion at the time of its 1993 launch; the shared development saved approximately 25% over developing separate vehicles for Ford and Ford of Europe. The Global and the American versions were to have about 75 percent parts commonality.

Derived from the Mazda GE platform (used by the Mazda Cronos/626 and the Mazda MX-6/Ford Probe), the platform replaced the DE-1 platform (Ford Sierra) and the CE14 platform (Ford Tempo/Mercury Topaz) under a single product range. First used for the 1993 Ford Mondeo, North America began usage of the CDW27 for 1995 with the Ford Contour.

During the 2000s, the architecture was phased out in favor of two midsize platforms developed separately; the CD3 architecture (developed with Mazda) was used in North America and the EUCD architecture (shared with Volvo) was used by Ford of Europe.

== Models ==
=== CDW27 (first generation) ===
- Ford Mondeo Mk I (1993–1996)
- Ford Contour (1995–2000)
- Ford Cougar (1999–2002)
- Mercury Mystique (1995–2000)
- Mercury Cougar (1999–2002)

=== CD162 (second generation) ===
- Ford Mondeo Mk II (1996–2000)

=== CD132 (third generation) ===
- Ford Mondeo Mk III (2000–2007)
- Jaguar X-Type (2001–2009)
