= Ford Mondeo (second generation) =

Second generation of Ford Mondeo

Ford Mondeo Mk3 (second generation)
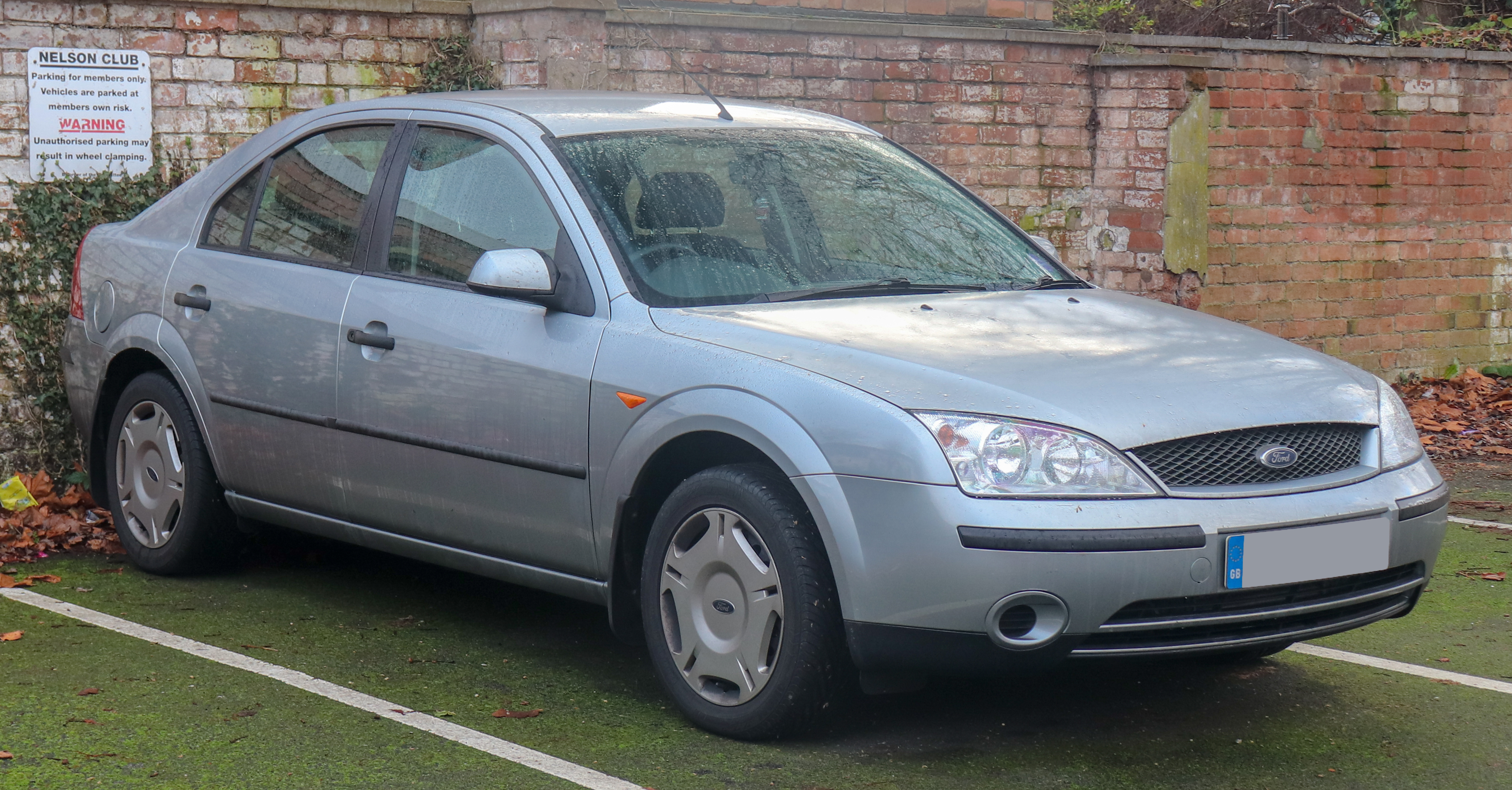

Overview
- Manufacturer: Ford Motor Company
- Also called: Ford Mondeo Metrostar (Taiwan)
- Production: 1 November 2000 – 1 August 2007
- Model years: 2001–2007
- Assembly: Belgium: Genk (Genk Body & Assembly); Taiwan: Zhongli (Ford Lio Ho); China: Chongqing (Changan Ford); Vietnam: Hai Duong (Ford Vietnam)
- Designer: Chris Bird (1997)

Body and chassis
- Class: Large family car (D)
- Body style: 4-door saloon 5-door liftback 5-door estate
- Layout: Transverse Front engine, front-wheel-drive
- Related: Jaguar X-Type

Powertrain
- Engine: Petrol engines: 1.8 L Mazda L8-DE I4; 1.8 L Mazda L8-VE SCi I4; 2.0 L Mazda LF I4; 2.5 L Duratec 24v V6; 3.0 L Duratec 30 V6; Diesel engines: 2.0 L Duratorq turbo I4; 2.0 L Duratorq common rail turbo I4; 2.2 L Duratorq common rail turbo I4
- Transmission: 5-speed manual MTX-75; 6-speed manual MMT6; 4-speed automatic; 5-speed automatic

Dimensions
- Wheelbase: 2,754 mm (108.4 in)
- Length: 4,731 mm (186.3 in) (saloon, liftback); 4,804 mm (189.1 in) (estate)
- Width: 1,812 mm (71.3 in) (ex. mirrors); 1,958 mm (77.1 in) (inc. mirrors)
- Height: 1,429 mm (56.3 in) (saloon, liftback); 1,441 mm (56.7 in) (estate)
- Curb weight: 1,364–1,578 kg (3,007–3,479 lb)

Chronology
- Predecessor: Ford Mondeo (first generation); Ford Scorpio
- Successor: Ford Mondeo (third generation)

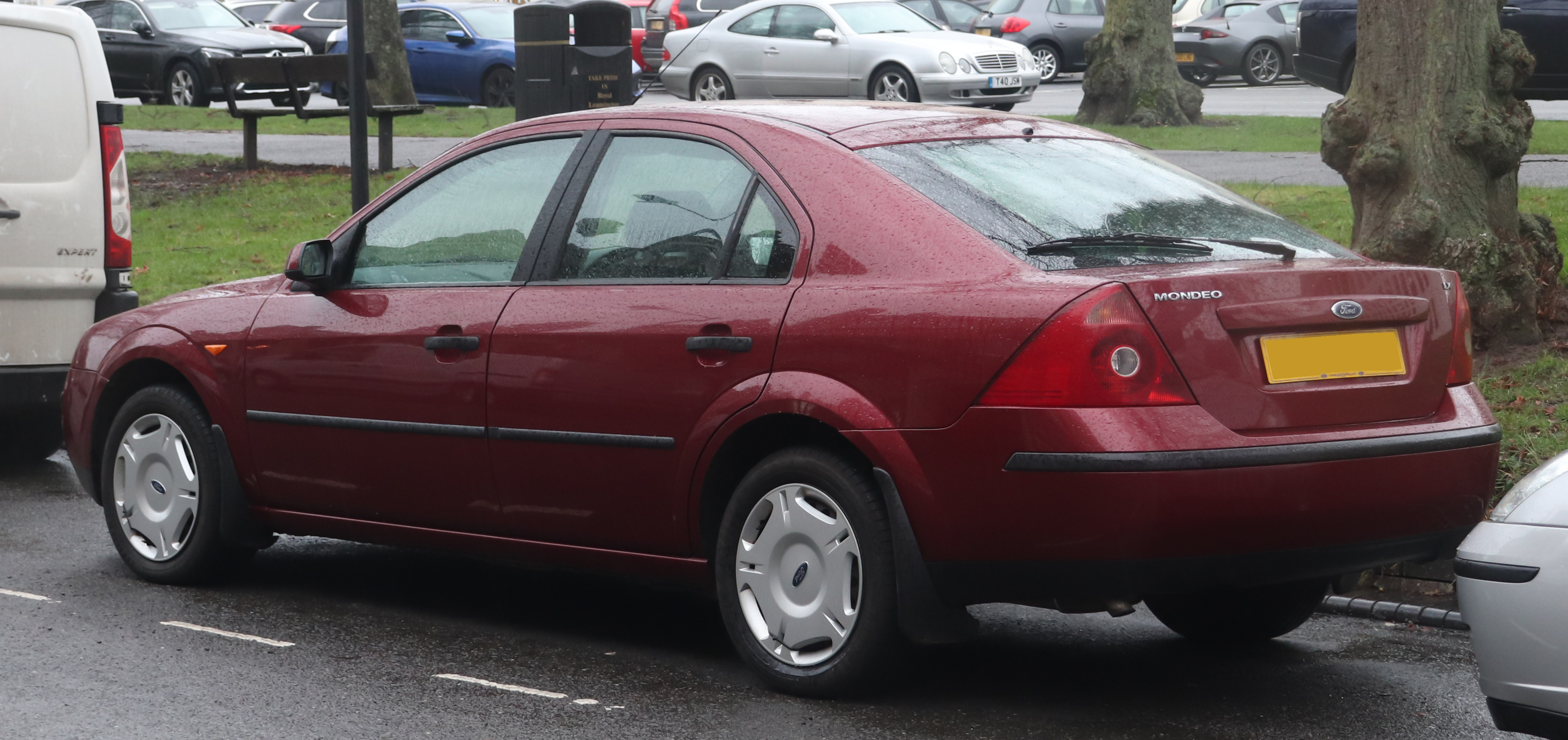
Liftback (pre-facelift)

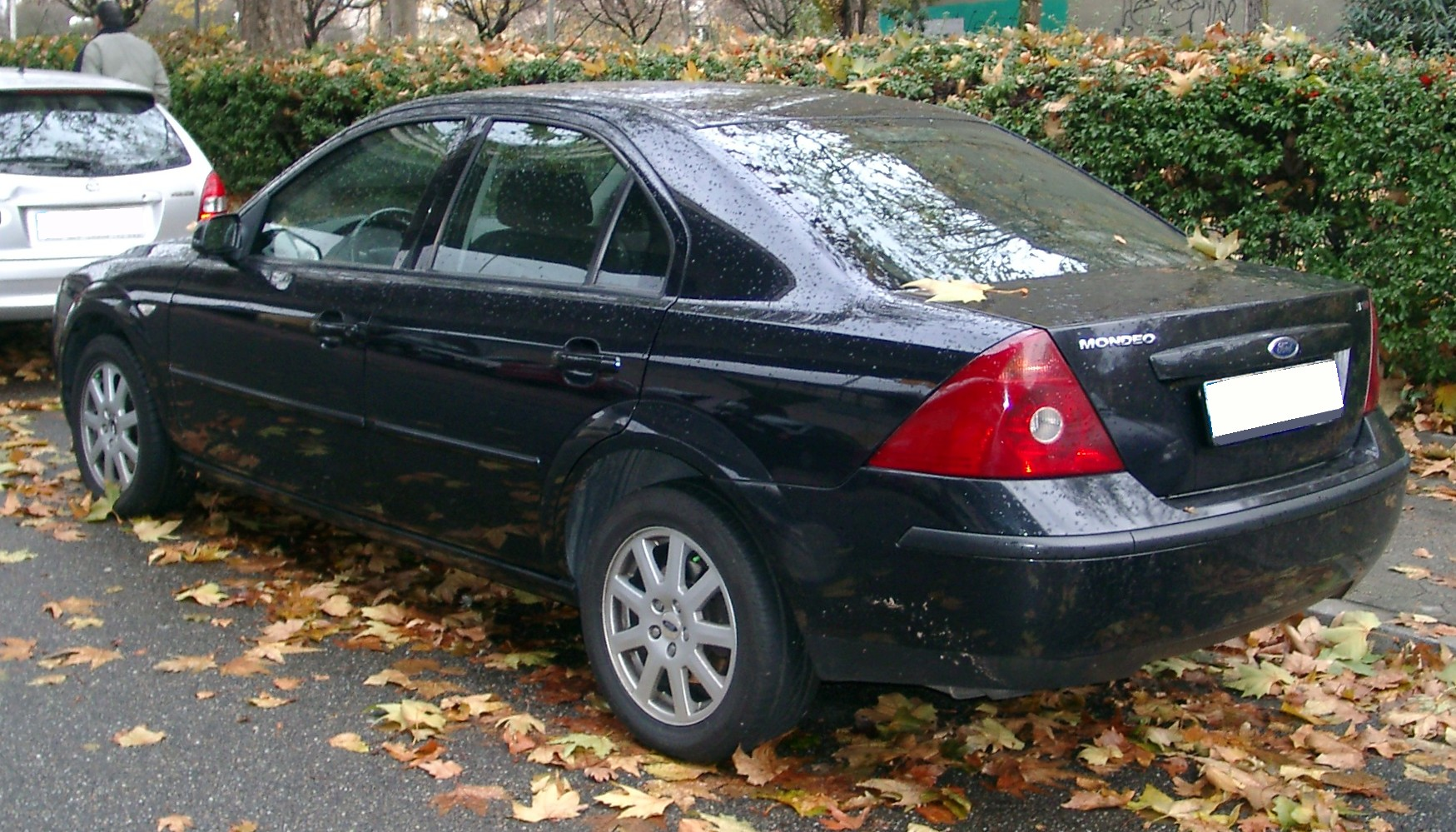
Saloon (pre-facelift)

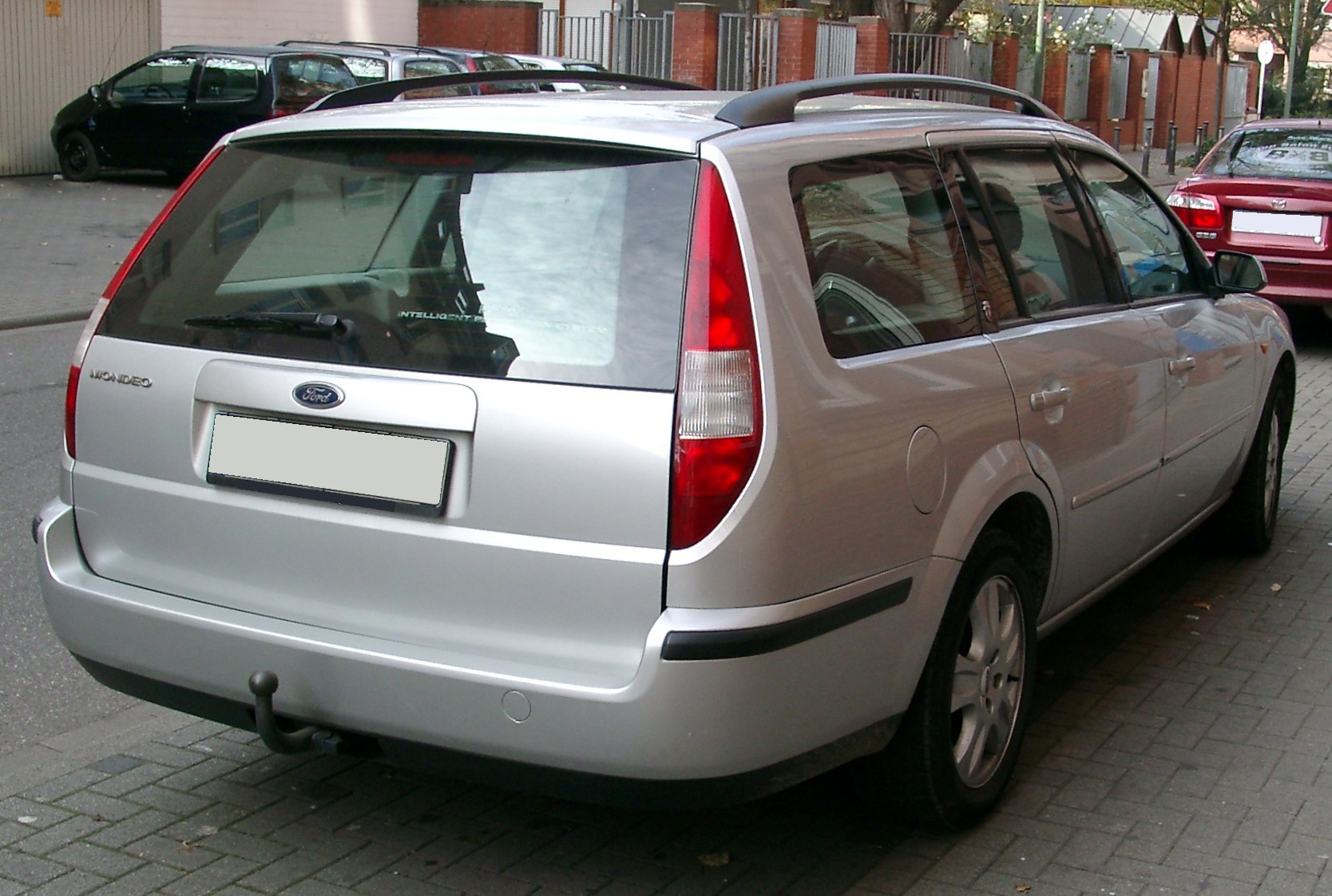
Estate (pre-facelift)

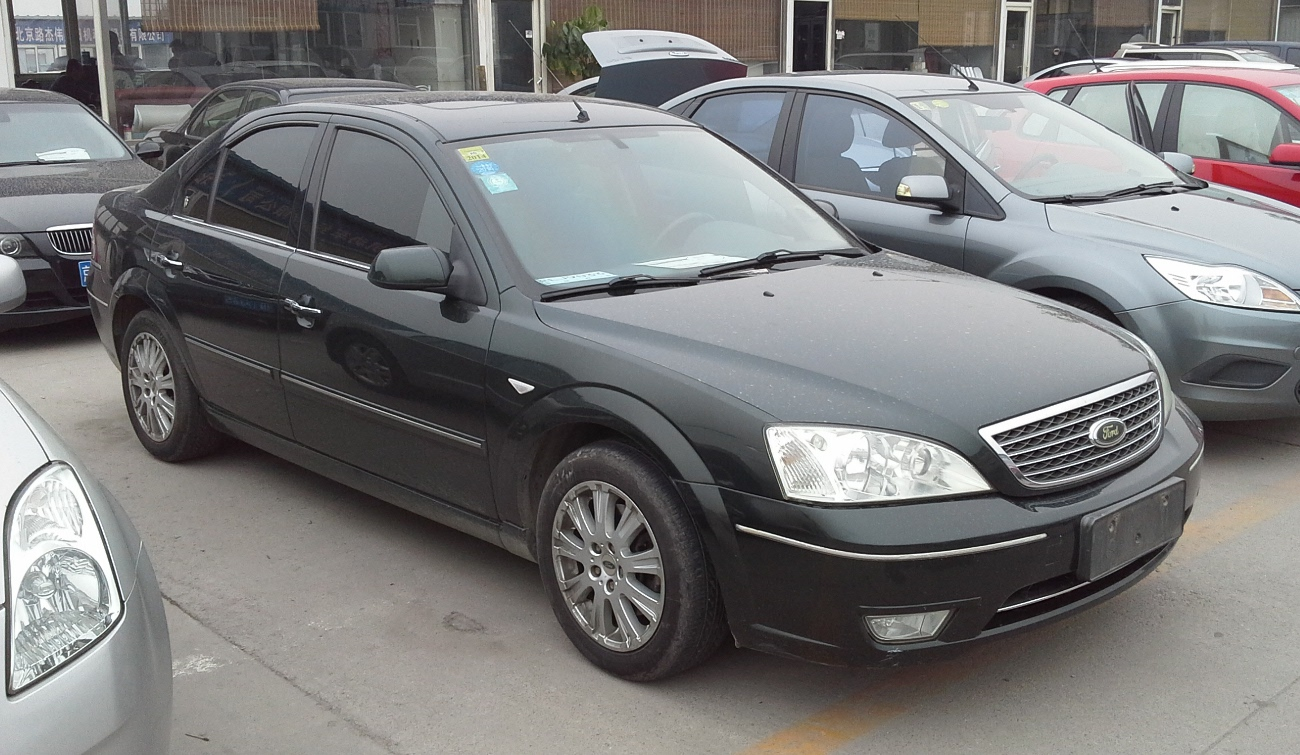

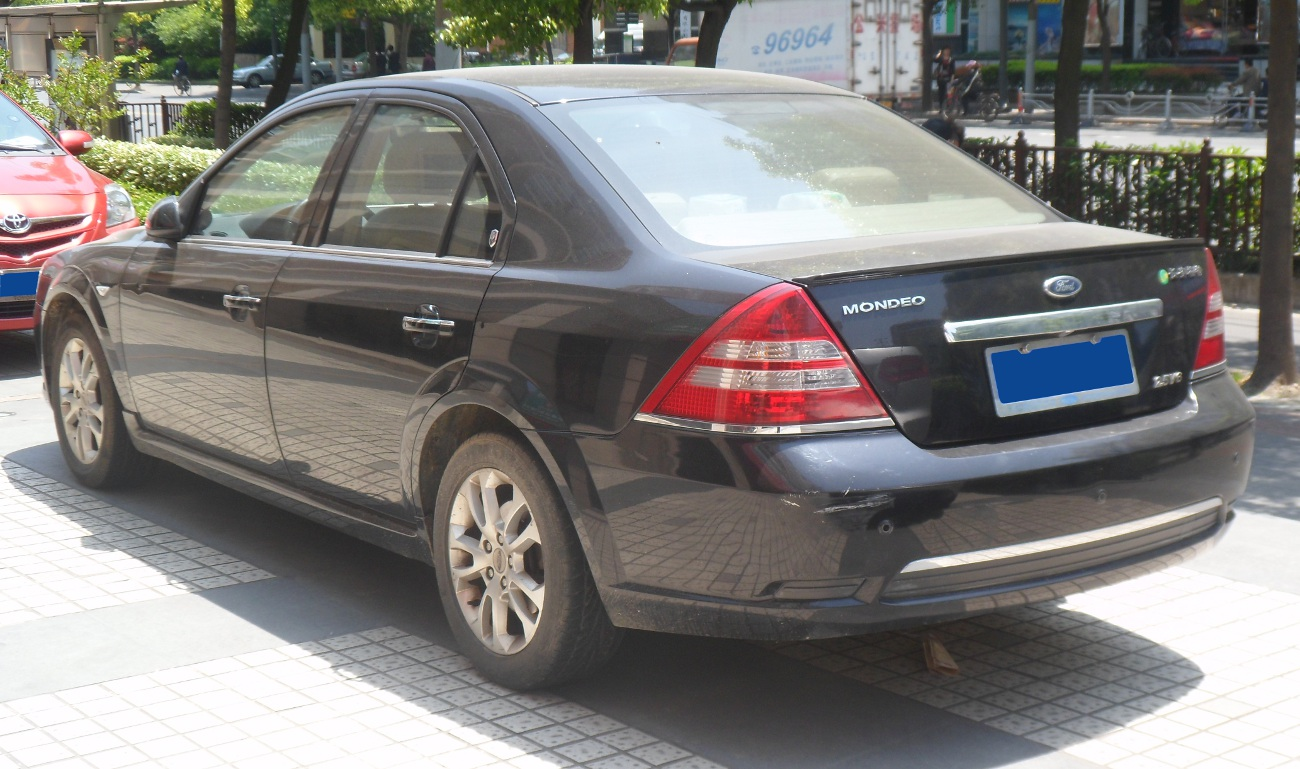
Ford Mondeo Metrostar facelift

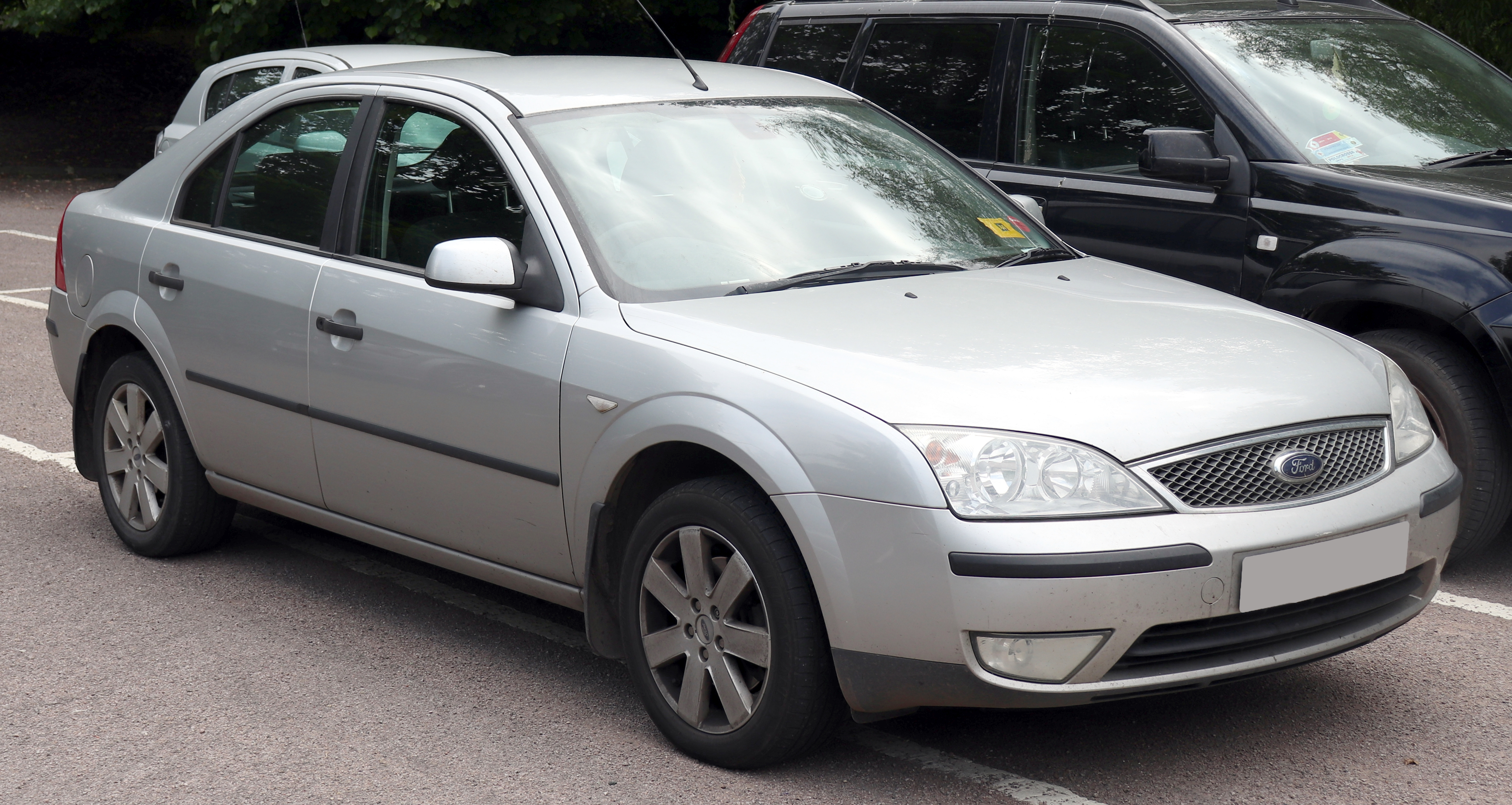

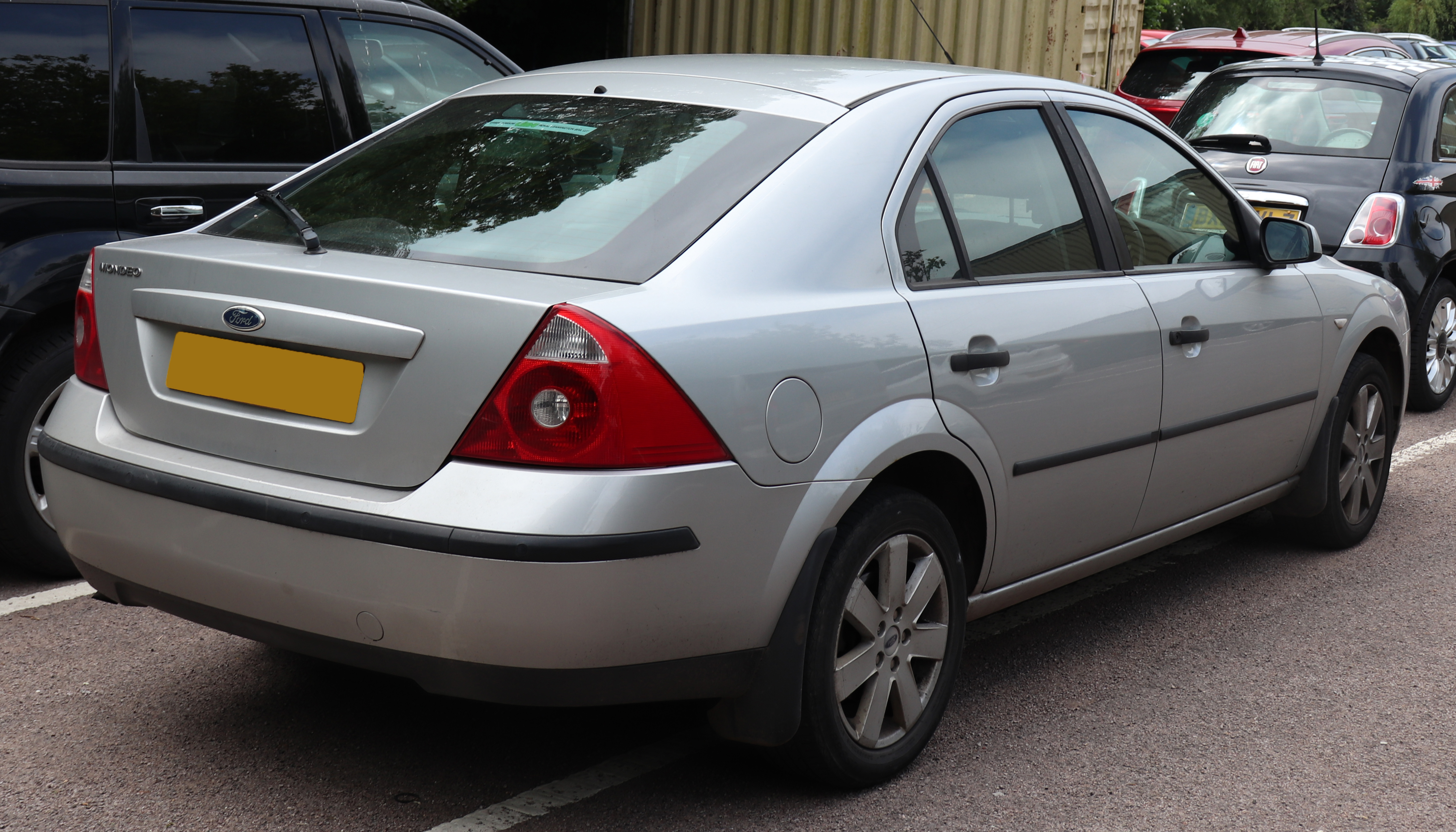
2003 facelift

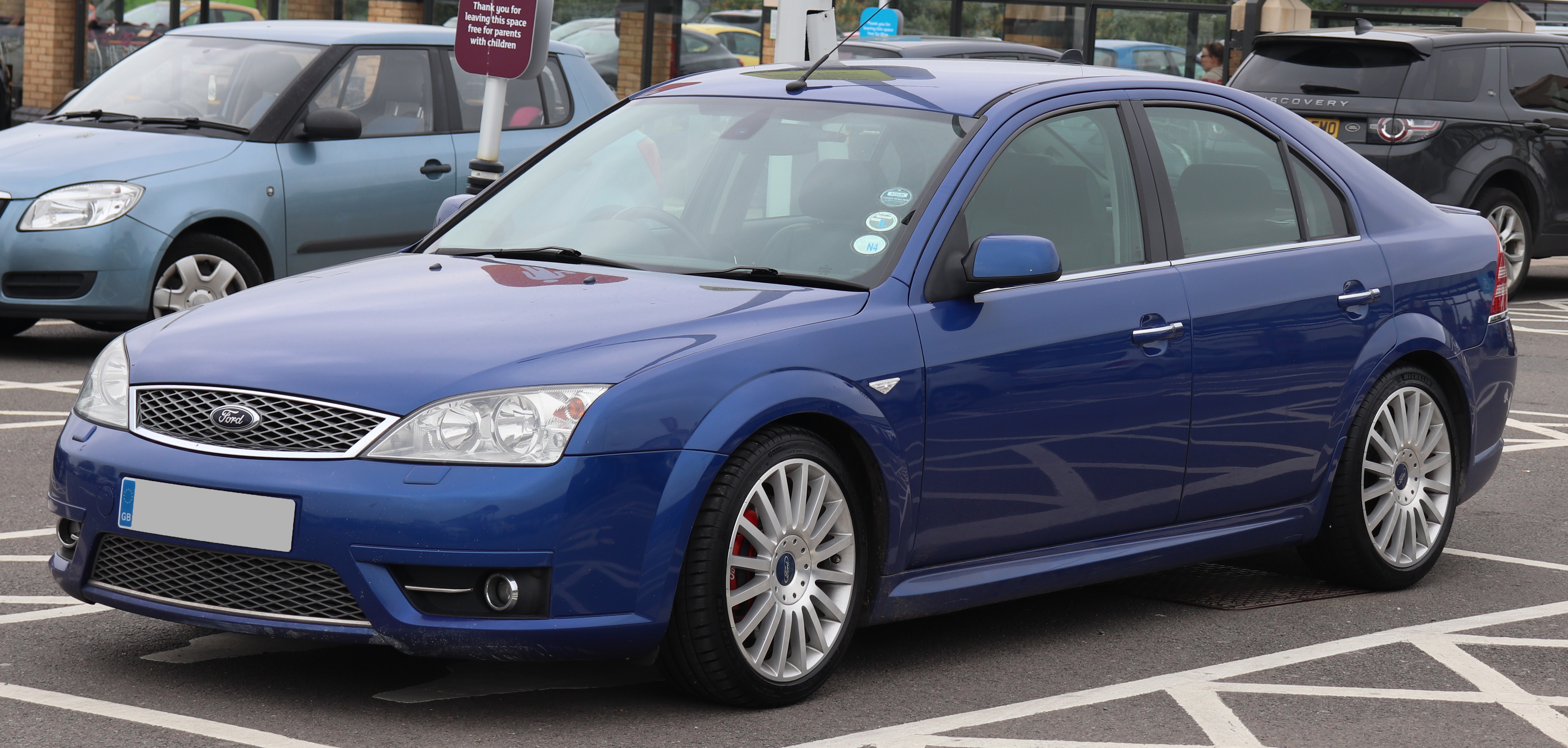

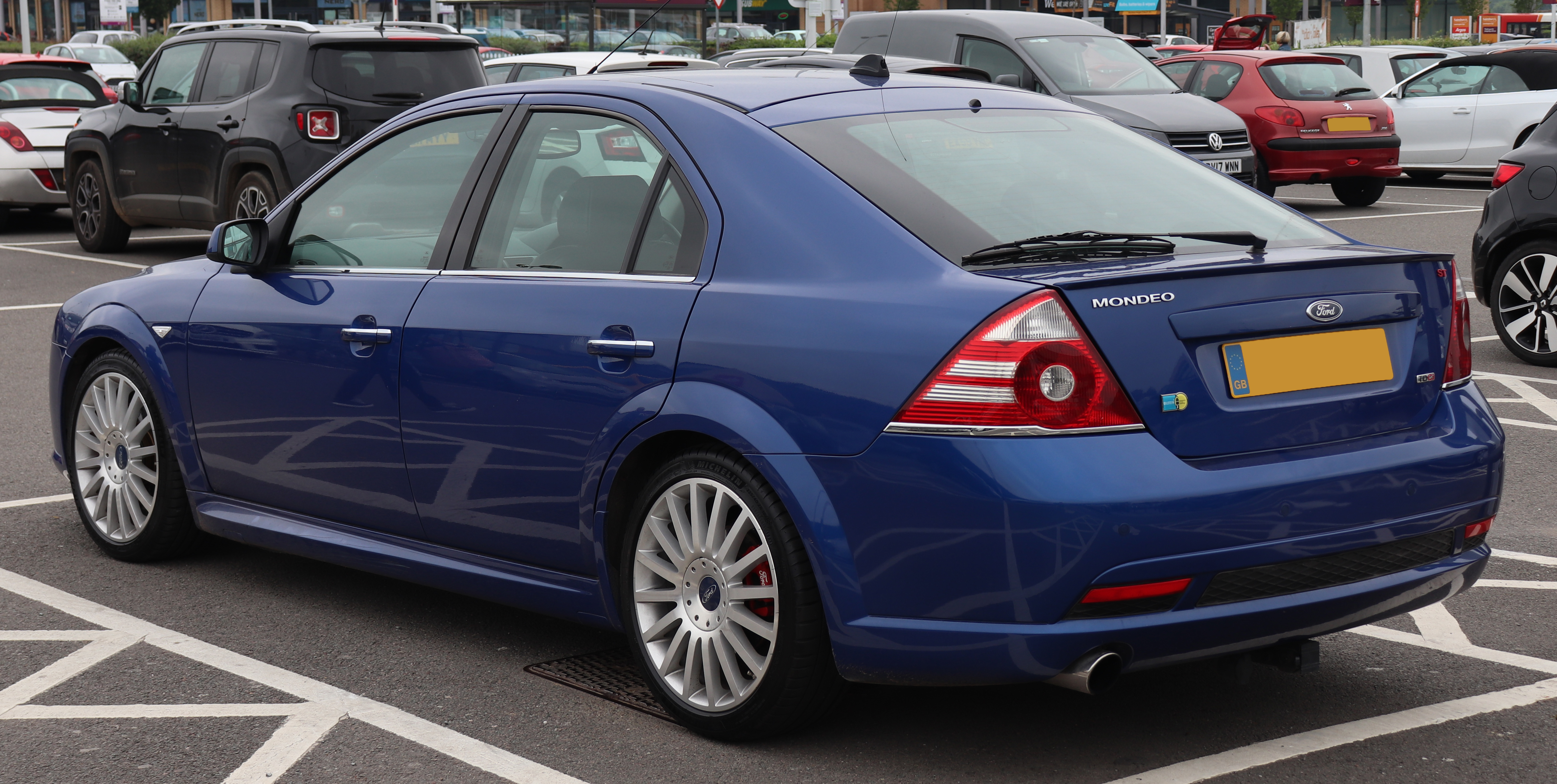
Ford Mondeo ST TDCi

The Ford Mondeo Mk3 (second generation) model was launched by Ford in October 2000. This Mondeo was considerably larger than its predecessor, and although Ford abandoned its New Edge design theme for the second generation, it was their first vehicle to fully benefit from the Prodigy concept car. This gave it an overall effect which many critics felt was more restrained and mature, if much less distinctive. Two of the old car's biggest weaknesses, the modest rear legroom, and uncompetitive diesel version were addressed by a 50 mm (2.0 in) longer wheelbase and the new Duratorq diesel engine. The basic chassis and suspension design was carried over from the previous generation, which meant that the car continued its predecessor's reputation for class leading handling and ride. This Mondeo came to Mexico, replacing the North American built Ford Contour, and was sold from 2001 to 2007, when the Ford Fusion replaced it. The North American market Fusion and Ford Five Hundred/Taurus featured very similar styling, inside and out.

Following the standard setting interior of the Volkswagen Passat (B5) in 1996, Ford paid a great deal of attention to the second generation Mondeo's interior and was the first major American manufacturer to react to the new standard set by Volkswagen. Ford dispensed with the rounded American style interior of the first generation, and developed a more sober, sophisticated, 'Germanic' design, using more expensive materials.

This Mondeo simplified trim levels a lot, for example the UK trims had been simplified down to LX, Zetec, Zetec S, Ghia, Ghia X and ST. Despite this, a mid-cycle facelift in 2003 saw the introduction of some new trim levels. Titanium and Titanium X slotted in between Zetec S and Ghia, and ST220 above the ST.

As with its predecessor, passive safety was a major selling point of the 2000 Mondeo. With an even stronger bodyshell, Ford introduced its so-called "Intelligent Protection System" (IPS), which used an "intelligent" array of sensors based on a neural network, to decide the best combination of safety devices (traditional front passenger airbags, side airbags and curtain airbags) to deploy for a given crash situation. To enhance active safety, all models were fitted with anti-lock brakes and electronic brake-force distribution, with electronic stability program (ESP) available as an option. Ford's marketing of the time claimed the Mondeo was 'One of the safest places to be'. However, Euro NCAP's testing of the 2000 to 2007 Mondeo found that it protected worse than most key rivals (Vauxhall Vectra, Citroën C5, Toyota Avensis, Volkswagen Passat), achieving a lower-end 4 star rating. Ford redesigned part of the car and it was re-tested, but the higher-than-average risk of chest injury to the driver in the frontal impact remained because the first and second generation Mondeo were based on the relatively dated CDW27 platform which related to the Mazda GE platform designed in late 1980s.

The Mondeo established itself as Britain's most popular automobile in its class and held this position every year from 2001 onwards, though this size of car has fallen slightly in popularity during the 2000s. This version of the Mondeo has never come higher than sixth in the SMMT's official list of the top selling cars in the UK each year. In 2003, it came tenth in the list.

The second generation Mondeo was never sold in Australia, as Ford Australia argued that the segment of the market was in decline. However in neighbouring New Zealand, it was voted Car of the Year in 2002 by the New Zealand Motoring Writers' Guild.

== Engines ==
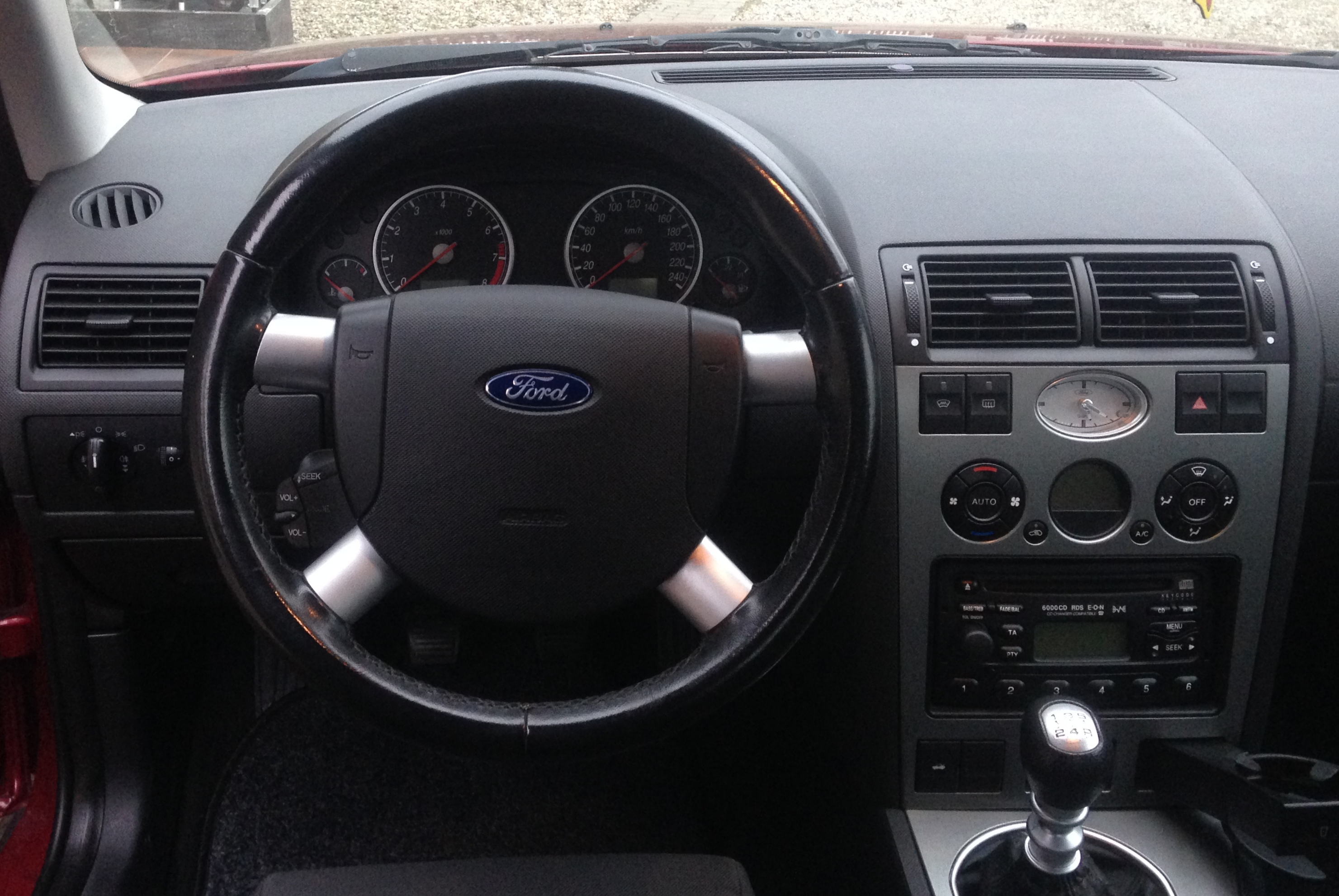
Interior

For the second generation Mondeo, the Zetec engine was replaced with 1.8 and 2.0 litre Mazda L engines, branded Duratec by Ford. The standard 2.5 L V6 engine was carried over, while a 3.0 L version was developed for the ST220 and higher trim models.

There was a design flaw with the Mazda units with the butterfly valves in the inlet manifold, which could cause severe engine damage when they failed. The plastic components of the butterfly valves wear out too quickly and when loose enough can result in them falling apart and releasing metal and plastic parts into the engine cylinders, potentially causing severe engine damage (How to Diagnose). The part was upgraded by Ford in late 2002 to early 2003 and this largely prevented the problem from occurring in later engines, though random failures were still reported on even the upgraded parts.

The archaic Endura-D 1.8 L turbodiesel engine was dropped, and replaced by a more sophisticated 2.0 L 16v Duratorq common rail (TDCi and TDDi) unit with a fixed or variable geometry turbine, this clever turbine system allows a certain amount of overboost, giving an extra 10% or so of torque for short periods. This engine, known within Ford as the "Puma"-type Duratorq, was first seen in the Transit in detuned form.

A new automatic transmission was added to the range called the Durashift. This unit has five gears and may be shifted manually or shifted like an automatic. A six-speed manual transmission was also added to the range, instead of just having a five-speed manual as seen in the previous model.

In June 2003, the Mondeo was given a very mild upgrade, the new models being identifiable by the larger chrome honeycomb grille, redesigned fog lights, a new central dashboard made from higher quality materials, with electronic climate control, either a standard Ford radio, Sony radio, or a satellite navigation radio/CD player, which also has climate control built into the unit in lieu of the space taken up by the unit. The Durashift automatic is now available with steering wheel control. The petrol engines were revised at this stage also — the new SCI (direct injection) version of the 1.8 L Duratec engine was introduced, which generates 4 kW (5 PS) more than the standard unit. In addition, equipment was upgraded across the range — with trip computer now standard on all models, and cruise control is also standard in selected trim levels and markets.

The main Sports version was the ST220, replacing the ST200 from the last model series. This was available in liftback, estate and saloon form. The ST220 produced 226 bhp (169 kW) from the newly developed 3.0-litre V6 engine, which made it capable of 0 to 62 mph (100 km/h) in 7.4 seconds, and on to a maximum speed of 155 mph (249 km/h). There was also a ST TDCi, a sports version of the regular diesel. This, available in all forms, had a 2.2-litre 4-cyl diesel engine, developing 153 bhp (114 kW). It accelerated from 0 to 62 mph (100 km/h) in 8.2 seconds, and had a maximum speed of 140 mph (230 km/h).

The higher range models, (i.e. the Zetec S, Ghia X and Titanium X), now had two V6 engines available; one being the existing Duratec 25 carried over from the previous model, and one being a Duratec 30; a quieter, smoother variant of the ST220 3.0-litre engine, which produced 206 bhp (154 kW). This was not dissimilar in performance to the ST220, with a 0 to 62 mph (100 km/h) time of 7.9 seconds and a top speed of 151 mph (243 km/h).

In 2005, there were two new Duratorq common rail (TDCi) options, a 2.2L with 114 kW (155 PS) and a detuned version of the 2.0L with 65 kW (89 PS). Also, the Seat Belt Warning System was added and is now standard, with an audible/visual warning signal reminding the driver to fasten his/her seat belt. The styling was upgraded again, the most notable difference being tweaked taillights.

== Market ==
=== Europe ===
Engines:

- 1.8 L (1798 cc) Duratec I4, 110 PS (108 hp or 81 kW and 122 lb⋅ft or 165 N⋅m) (1.8)
- 1.8 L (1798 cc) Duratec I4, 125 PS (123 hp or 92 kW and 125 lb⋅ft or 169 N⋅m) (1.8)
- 1.8 L (1798 cc) Duratec SCi I4, 131 PS (129 hp or 96 kW and 129 lb⋅ft or 175 N⋅m) (1.8 SCi)
- 2.0 L (1999 cc) Duratec I4, 145 PS (143 hp or 107 kW and 140 lb⋅ft or 190 N⋅m) (2.0)
- 2.5 L (2495 cc) Duratec 24v V6, 170 PS (168 hp or 125 kW and 162 lb⋅ft or 220 N⋅m) (2.5)
- 3.0 L (2967 cc) Duratec 30 V6, 204 PS (201 hp or 150 kW and 207 lb⋅ft or 281 N⋅m) (3.0)
- 3.0 L (2967 cc) Duratec 30 V6, 226 PS (223 hp or 166 kW and 210 lb⋅ft or 280 N⋅m) (3.0 ST220)
- 2.0 L (1998 cc) Duratorq I4, 90 PS (89 hp or 66 kW and 155 lb⋅ft or 210 N⋅m) (2.0 TDDi 90)
- 2.0 L (1998 cc) Duratorq I4, 116 PS (114 hp or 85 kW and 207 lb⋅ft or 281 N⋅m) (2.0 TDDi and TDCi 115)
- 2.0 L (1998 cc) Duratorq I4, 131 PS (129 hp (96 kW) and 244 lb⋅ft or 331 N⋅m) (2.0 TDCi 130)
- 2.2 L (2198 cc) Duratorq I4, 155 PS (153 hp or 114 kW and 265 lb⋅ft or 359 N⋅m) (2.2 TDCi 155)

=== North America ===
Mexico

In Mexico, the model was similar to the European version to replace the Ford Contour. Trim levels were Core, Edge, Ghia and 100 units of the ST220 (sold as a limited edition), it was sold only with the 2.0 4-cylinder, 2.5 V6 and 3.0 V6 (for the ST220) petrol: no turbodiesel or estate versions were available in Mexico. Its nearest rival were the Chevrolet Vectra and Volkswagen Passat. 2007 was the last year of the Mondeo for Mexico, being sold together with the Ford Fusion until it finally replaced it.

=== South America ===
Brazil

In Brazil, Ford do Brasil re-imported the Mondeo from 2002, until the Fusion replaced it in 2006. The Mondeo was offered only as a saloon, and had the 2.0 143 hp inline-4 engine. The V6 version was sold only during the past generation (1999–2000). No flexifuel variant was available. There was only one trim level, the Ghia, with manual or automatic gearbox.

=== Asia ===
Taiwan

In Taiwan, the second generation Ford Mondeo (CD132) was produced in Zhongli, Taiwan from 2001. It was redesigned and marketed by Ford Lio Ho as the Ford Mondeo Metrostar. The redesign featured 17 inch alloys, 14 inch brake disks, a completely redesigned front end and restyled tail lamps, while the interior remained the same as the European model, featuring Nappa leather and the IP imported from Germany. Two versions of the grilles were offered, with the earlier one featuring vertical bars with the Ford badge on the top and the latter-launched one from 2003 for the V6 models featuring horizontal bars and the Ford oval in the centre. The V6 version of the grilles were later available in lower trim models as the Koln Edition. A facelift called the Ford Mondeo Metrostar A+ was launched by the end of 2003, featuring completely redesigned front end and restyled tail lamps once again. The Europe spec Mondeo RS model was also produced in Taiwan starting from 2002 and offered as a sportier variant, while the European Mondeo ST220 performance model was imported.

The Ford Mondeo Metrostar in Taiwan was also exported to a few countries in east Asia including China and Vietnam. The Ford Mondeo Metrostar in Taiwan was produced from 2001 to 2007 as a 4-door sedan only. The model is powered by a 2.0-litre DOHC inline-4 engine or a 2.5 DOHC V6 engine option for the post 2003 model.

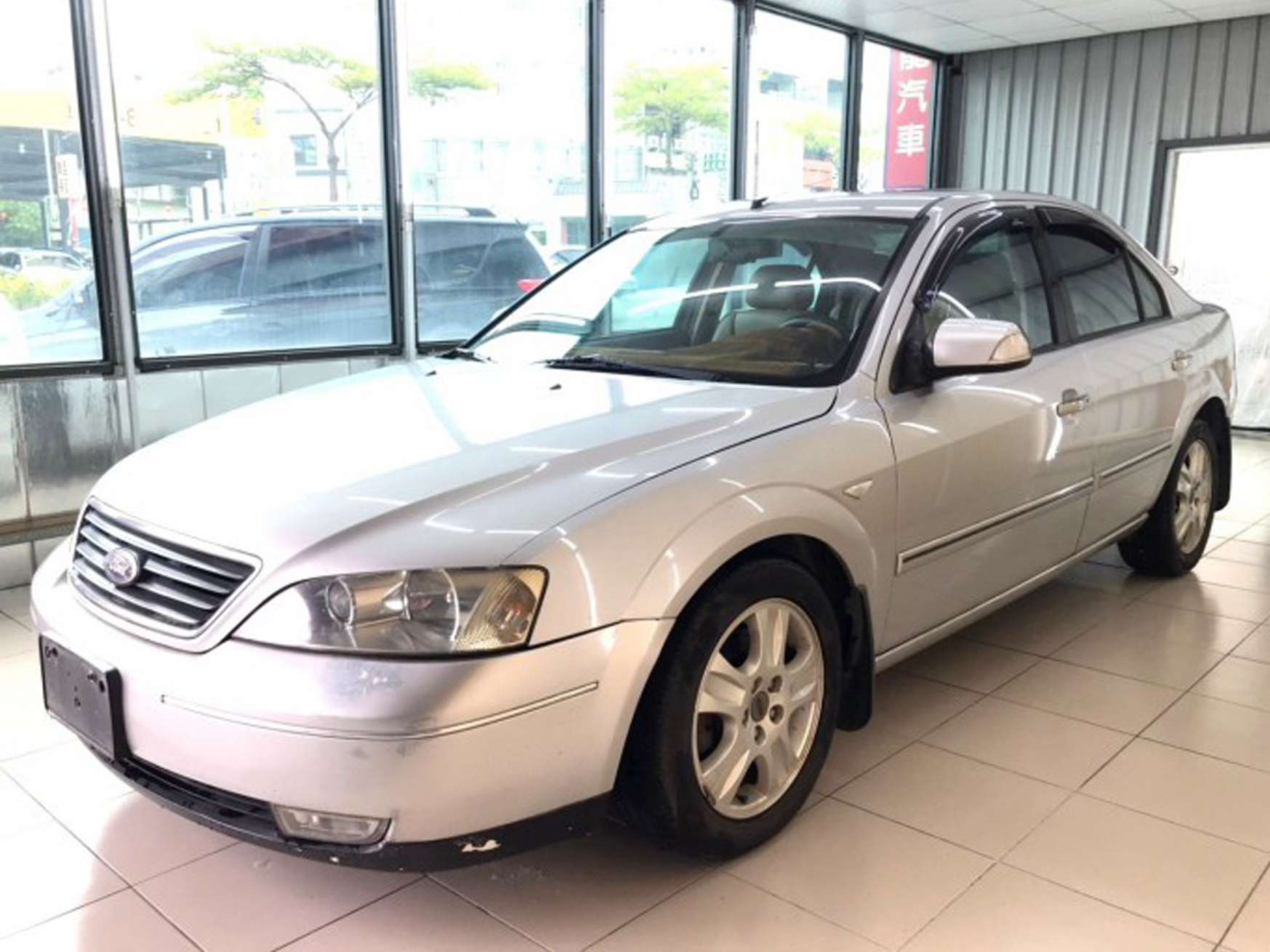
Ford Mondeo Metrostar V6 front

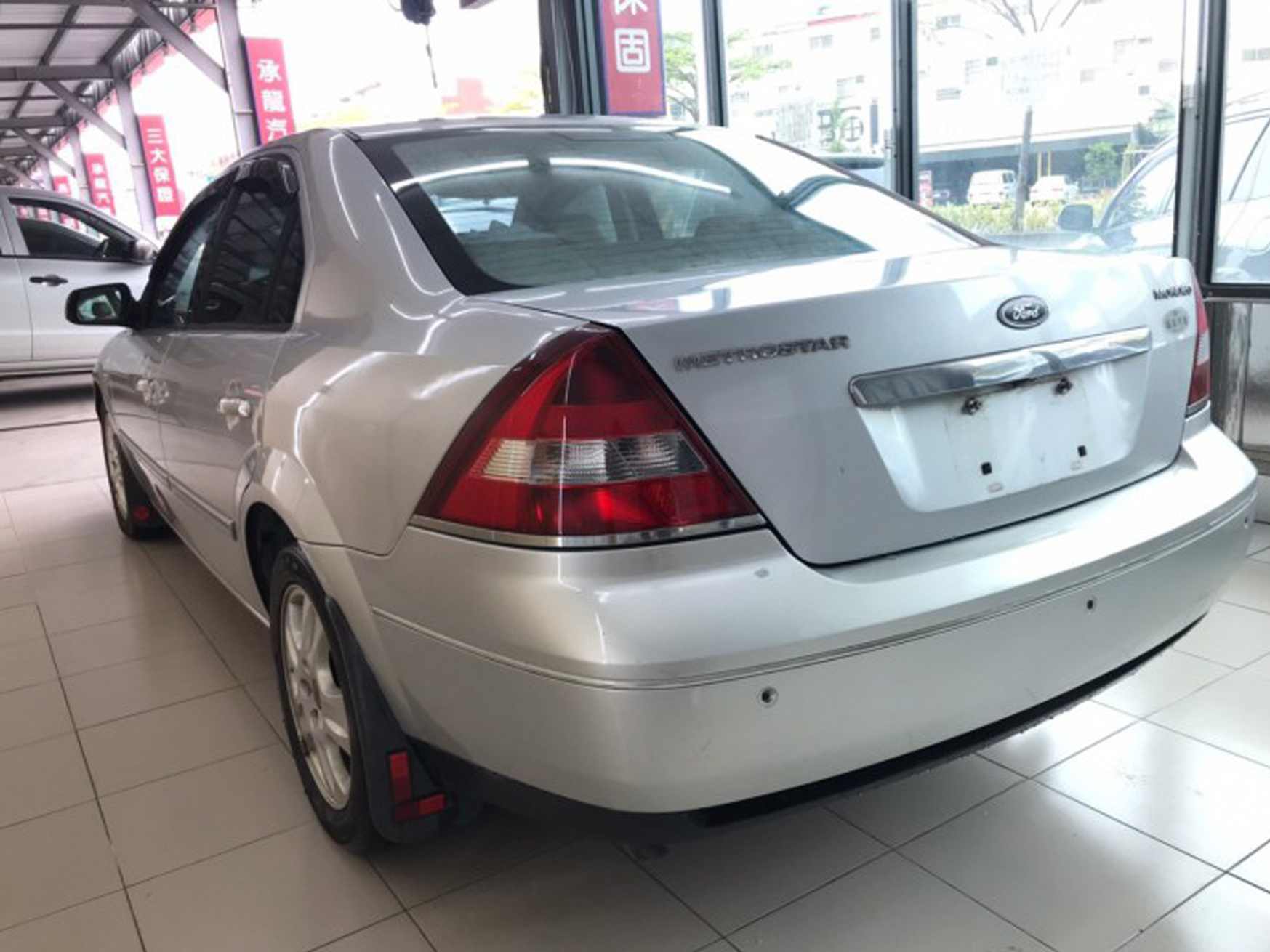
Ford Mondeo Metrostar V6 rear

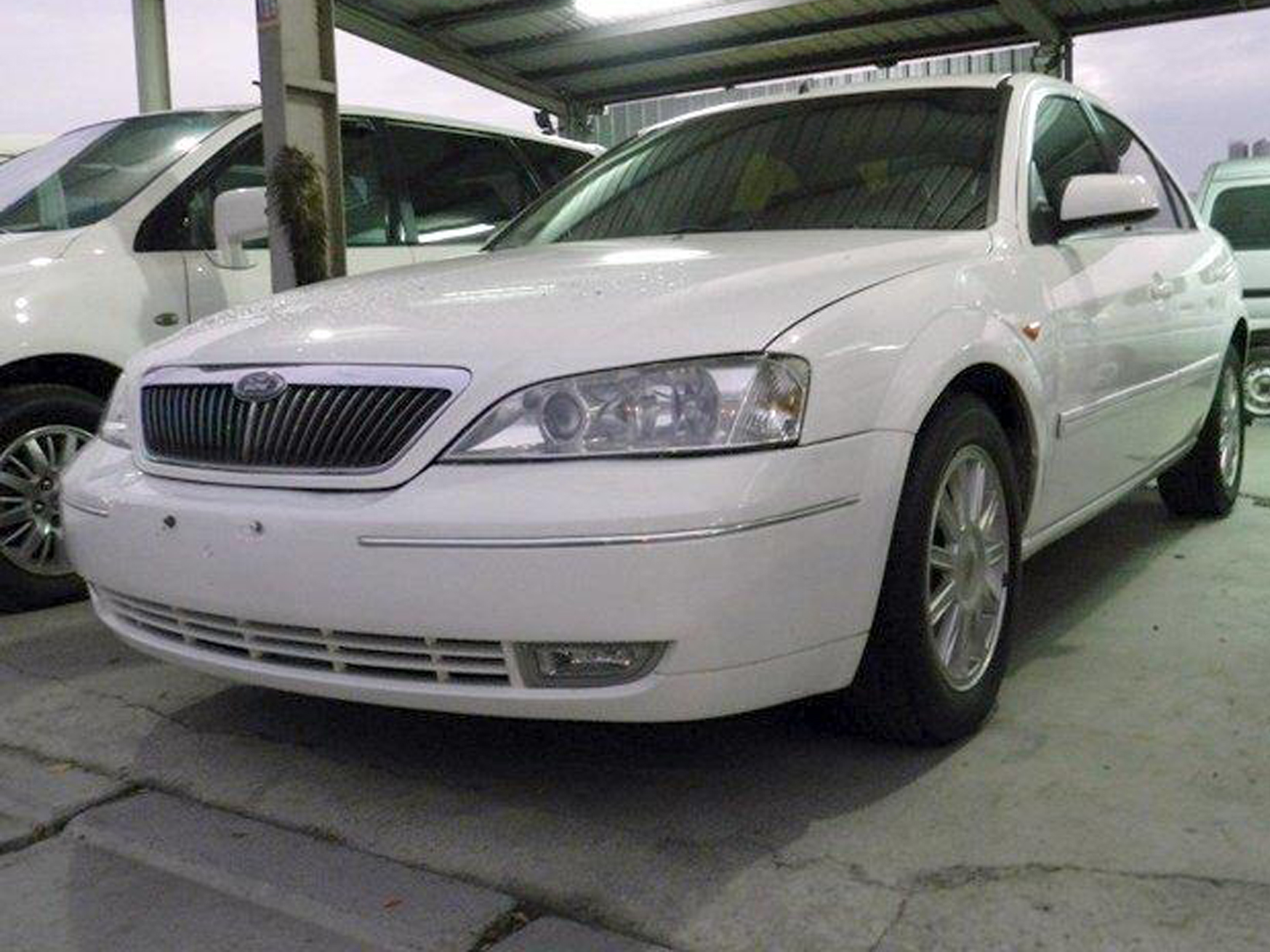
Ford Mondeo Metrostar I4 in Taiwan
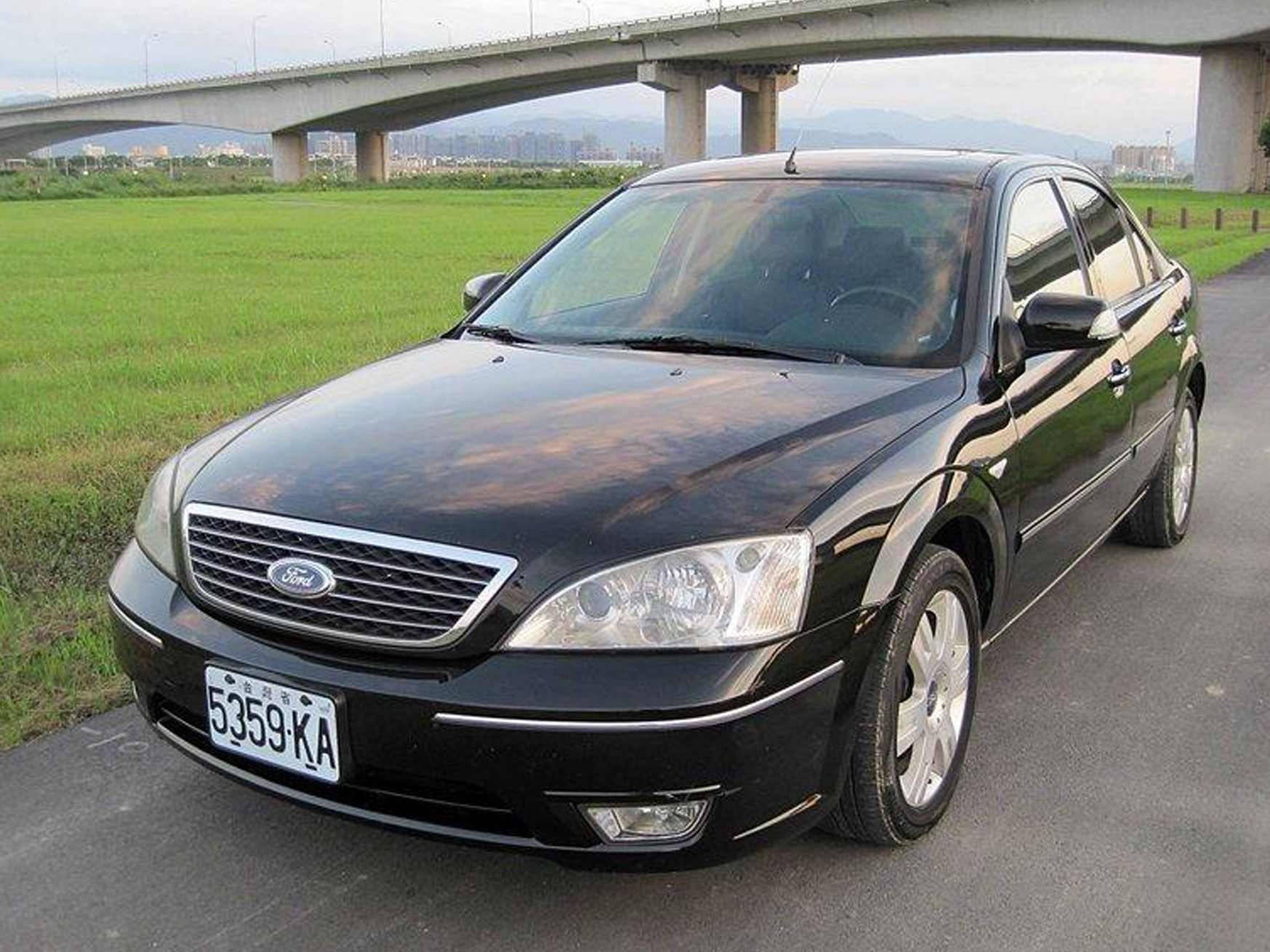
Ford Mondeo Metrostar A+ front

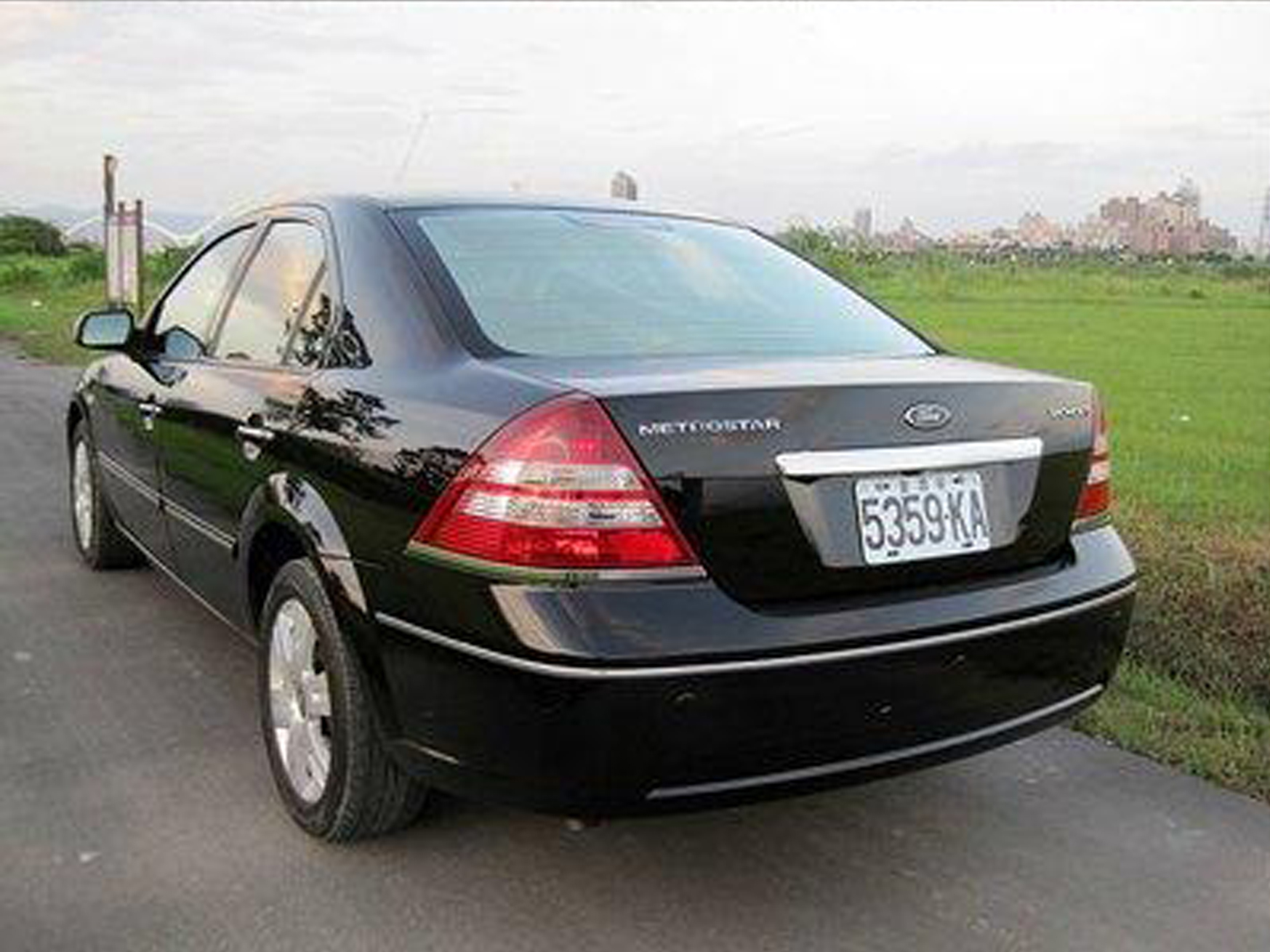
Ford Mondeo Metrostar A+ rear

China

In China, the version sold was the top of the trim Taiwanese Ford Mondeo Metrostar exported from Taiwan, the Mondeo Metrostar Ghia X model, which was not offered in Taiwan, and sold from over 300,000 RMB initially. Later prices of the Taiwan-produced model were dropped to 230,000 RMB. After the Ford Mondeo Metrostar A+ facelift, Changan Ford started to produce the Ford Lio Ho designed model domestically as the Ford Mondeo in China, and a minor facelift featuring a new front bumper was launched later.

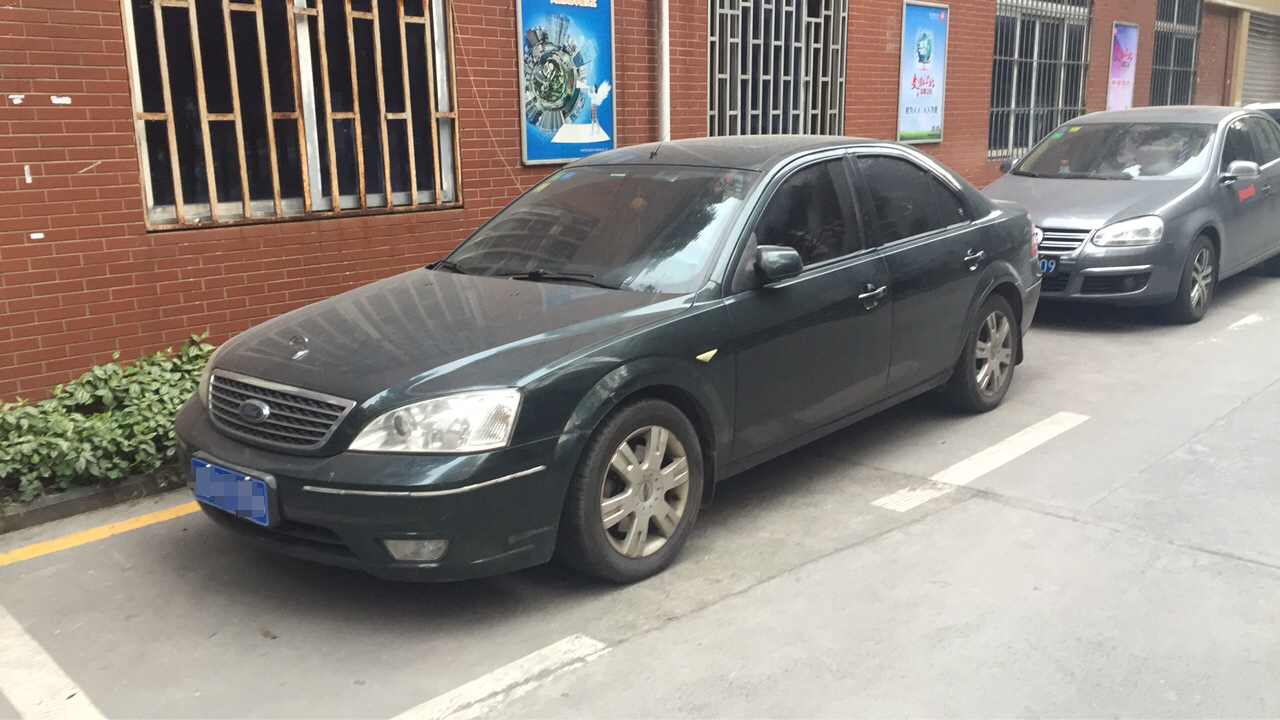
Ford Mondeo III by Changan Ford in China

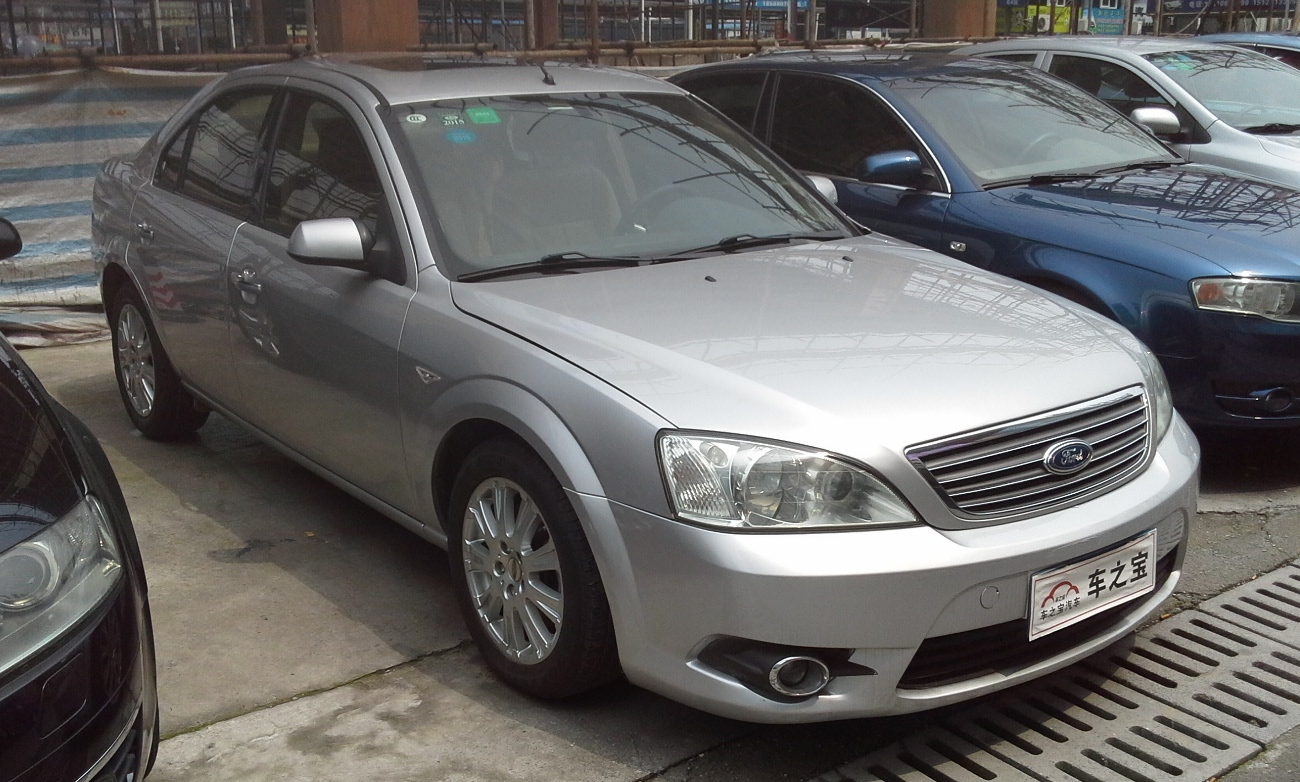
Ford Mondeo III by facelift by Changan Ford in China

== Safety ==
ANCAP test results* Ford Mondeo New Zealand Mk3 variants (2003)
| Test | Score |
|---|---|
| Overall | 4 /5 stars |
| Frontal offset | 10.37/16 |
| Side impact | 15.75/16 |
| Pole | 2/2 |
| Seat belt reminders | 0/3 |
| Whiplash protection | Not Assessed |
| Pedestrian protection | Marginal |
| Electronic stability control | Optional |
