= 1994 Super Tourenwagen Cup =

Seasons
- ← none 1995 →

The 1994 ADAC Super Touren Wagen Cup was the first edition of the Super Tourenwagen Cup (STW).

== Teams and drivers ==
Team	Car	No.	Drivers	Rounds
(Germany) BMW Motorsport	BMW 318is	2	(Venezuela) Johnny Cecotto	All
(Germany) BMW Motorsport	BMW 318is	3	(Germany) Alexander Burgstaller	All
(France) ROC Competition	Audi 80 Quattro Competition	4	(Germany) Frank Biela	All
(France) ROC Competition	Audi 80 Quattro Competition	5	(Italy) Emanuele Pirro	All
(Switzerland) Eggenberger Motorsport	Ford Mondeo Ghia	6	(Switzerland) Bruno Eichmann	All
(Switzerland) Eggenberger Motorsport	Ford Mondeo Ghia	7	(Belgium) Thierry Boutsen	All
(Germany) BMW Team Isert	BMW 318is	8	(Switzerland) Yolanda Surer	All
(Germany) Ford Wolf Racing	Ford Mondeo Ghia	9	(Germany) Markus Oestreich	All
(Germany) BMW Team Schneider	BMW 318is	11	(Germany) Altfrid Heger	All
(Czech Republic) Bervid Sport Styling/MHTsports	BMW 318is	12	(Czech Republic) Vaclav Bervid	5
(Germany) BMW Team Isert	BMW 318is	14	(Netherlands) Peter Kox	6–8
(Germany) GH Sport	Opel Astra	15	(Germany) Mario Hebler	1-2
(Italy) BMW Team Bigazzi	BMW 318is	15	(Italy) Roberto Ravaglia	7
(Germany) BMW Team Schneider	BMW 318is	18	(Netherlands) Patrick Huisman	4, 7
(Germany) BMW Team Schneider	BMW 318is	19	(Germany) Franz Engstler	8
(Germany) BMW Team Isert	BMW 318is	20	(Austria) Dieter Quester	5–6
(Italy) Nissan Castrol Racing	Nissan Primera eGT	22	(Netherlands) Raymond Coronel	4
(Italy) Nissan Castrol Racing	Nissan Primera eGT	23	(Germany) Michael Bartels	All
(Italy) Nissan Castrol Racing	Nissan Primera eGT	24	(Italy) Ivan Capelli	All
(Italy) BMW Team Bigazzi	BMW 318is	25	(Germany) Joachim Winkelhock	5, 8
(Czech Republic) Bychl-Euroracing	BMW 318is	26	(Czech Republic) Miloš Bychl	3, 6, 8
(Germany) Lauderbach Motorsport	Opel Astra	27	(Germany) Marco Werner	All
(Czech Republic) Bervid Sport Styling/MHTsports	BMW 318is	29	(Germany) Michael Heigert	5–8
(Germany) Ford Wolf Racing	Ford Mondeo Ghia	30	(Germany) Klaus Panchyrz	3–8
BMW Team Belgium	BMW 318is	31	(Belgium) Marc Duez	1–2
BMW Team Belgium	BMW 318is	32	(Belgium) Thierry Tassin	1–2
(Switzerland) Ecurie Basilisk	Mitsubishi Lancer GTi	33	(Switzerland) René Hollinger	3, 8
(Switzerland) Bemani Motoren	Toyota Carina E	36	(Switzerland) Philip Müller	8
(France) ROC Competition	Audi 80 Quattro Competition	40	(Italy) Rinaldo Capello	1, 3–8
(Belgium) Belgian VW Audi Club	Audi 80 Quattro Competition	41	(Belgium) Philippe Adams	3
(Germany) SMS Schmidt Motorsport	Audi 80 Quattro Competition	43	(Austria) Oliver Tichy	6
(Germany) SMS Schmidt Motorsport	Audi 80 Quattro Competition	44	(Germany) Hans-Joachim Stuck	1–4, 7–8
(Germany) SMS Schmidt Motorsport	Audi 80 Quattro Competition	45	(Germany) Patrick Bernhardt	All

== Race calendar and winners ==
Round	Circuit	Date	Pole position	Fastest lap	Winning driver	Winning team
1	(Germany) AVUS	1 May	(Italy) Emanuele Pirro	(Italy) Emanuele Pirro	(Germany) Frank Biela	ROC Competition
2	(Germany) Wunstorf	12 June	(Germany) Patrick Bernhardt	(Germany) Patrick Bernhardt	(Germany) Frank Biela	ROC Competition
3	(Belgium) Zolder	3 July	(Italy) Emanuele Pirro	(Germany) Frank Biela	(Venezuela) Johnny Cecotto	BMW Motorsport
4	(Netherlands) Zandvoort	17 July	(Germany) Frank Biela	(Italy) Rinaldo Capello	(Germany) Frank Biela	ROC Competition
5	(Austria) Österreichring	7 August	(Germany) Altfrid Heger	(Italy) Ivan Capelli	(Germany) Altfrid Heger	BMW Team Schneider
6	(Austria) Salzburgring	28 August	(Italy) Emanuele Pirro	(Germany) Frank Biela	(Venezuela) Johnny Cecotto	BMW Motorsport
7	(Belgium) Spa-Francorchamps	11 September	(Venezuela) Johnny Cecotto	(Venezuela) Johnny Cecotto	(Venezuela) Johnny Cecotto	BMW Motorsport
8	(Germany) Nürburgring	25 September	(Venezuela) Johnny Cecotto	(Venezuela) Johnny Cecotto	(Venezuela) Johnny Cecotto	BMW Motorsport

== Round 1 | (Germany) AVUS ==
Qualifying

Pos	No	Driver	Car	Lap Time
1	5	(Italy) Emanuele Pirro	Audi 80 Quattro	1.00.56
2	4	(Germany) Frank Biela	Audi 80 Quattro	1.00.71
3	7	(Belgium) Thierry Boutsen	Ford Mondeo Ghia	1.00.72
4	40	(Italy) Rinaldo Capello	Audi 80 Quattro	1.00.76
5	9	(Germany) Markus Oestreich	Ford Mondeo Ghia	1.00.90
6	45	(Germany) Patrick Bernhardt	Audi 80 Quattro	1.00.95
7	23	(Germany) Michael Bartels	Nissan Primera eGT	1.00.96
8	24	(Italy) Ivan Capelli	Nissan Primera eGT	1.01.17
9	44	(Germany) Hans-Joachim Stuck	Audi 80 Quattro	1.01.18
10	32	(Belgium) Thierry Tassin	BMW 318iS	1.01.38
11	2	(Venezuela) Johnny Cecotto	BMW 318iS	1.01.38
12	22	(Germany) Altfrid Heger	BMW 318iS	1.01.47
13	3	(Germany) Alexander Burgstaller	BMW 318iS	1.01.50
14	6	(Germany) Bruno Eichmann	Ford Mondeo Ghia	1.02.00
15	27	(Germany) Marco Werner	Opel Astra	1.02.20
16	31	(Italy) Marc Duez	BMW 318iS	1.02.38
17	8	(Switzerland) Yolanda Surer	BMW 318iS	1.02.66
18	15	(Germany) Mario Hebler	Opel Astra	no time

Race

Pos	No	Driver	Constructor	Time/Retired	Points
1	4	(Germany) Frank Biela	Audi 80 Quattro	36 laps in 46:17.040	20
2	5	(Italy) Emanuele Pirro	Audi 80 Quattro	+0.61s	15
3	40	(Italy) Rinaldo Capello	Audi 80 Quattro	+8.75s	12
4	7	(Belgium) Thierry Boutsen	Ford Mondeo Ghia	+11.47s	10
5	9	(Germany) Markus Oestreich	Ford Mondeo Ghia	+14.92s	8
6	44	(Germany) Hans-Joachim Stuck	Audi 80 Quattro	+17.07s	6
7	32	(Belgium) Thierry Tassin	BMW 318iS	+23.83s	4
8	2	(Venezuela) Johnny Cecotto	BMW 318iS	+28.23	3
9	11	(Germany) Altfrid Heger	BMW 318iS	+33.97s	2
10	8	(Switzerland) Yolanda Surer	BMW 318iS	+1 lap	1
11	45	(Germany) Patrick Bernhardt	Audi 80 Quattro	+2 laps	
12	23	(Germany) Michael Bartels	Nissan Primera eGT	+2 laps	
13	3	(Germany) Alexander Burgstaller	BMW 318iS	+2 laps	
14	27	(Germany) Marco Werner	Opel Astra	+6 laps	
DNF	31	(Italy) Marc Duez	BMW 318iS	+15 laps	
DNF	24	(Italy) Ivan Capelli	Nissan Primera eGT	+35 laps	
DNS	6	(Germany) Bruno Eichmann	Ford Mondeo Ghia		
DNS	15	(Germany) Mario Hebler	Opel Astra		

- Fastest Lap: Emanuele Pirro in 1.00.330

=== Championship standings after Round 1 ===
Drivers' Championship standings

Pos	Driver	Points
1	(Germany) Frank Biela	20
2	(Italy) Emanuele Pirro	15
3	(Italy) Rinaldo Capello	12
4	(Belgium) Thierry Boutsen	10
5	(Germany) Markus Oestreich	8

Constructors' Championship standings

Pos	Constructor	Points
1	(Germany) Audi	35
2	(United States) Ford	18
3	(Germany) BMW	7
4	(Japan) Nissan	0
5	(Germany) Opel	0

== Round 2 | (Germany) Wunstorf ==
Qualifying

Pos	No	Driver	Car	Lap Time
1	45	(Germany) Patrick Bernhardt	Audi 80 Quattro	1.50.10
2	4	(Germany) Frank Biela	Audi 80 Quattro	1.50.12
3	44	(Germany) Hans-Joachim Stuck	Audi 80 Quattro	1.50.16
4	5	(Italy) Emanuele Pirro	Audi 80 Quattro	1.50.22
5	9	(Germany) Markus Oestreich	Ford Mondeo Ghia	1.50.34
6	24	(Italy) Ivan Capelli	Nissan Primera eGT	1.51.19
7	2	(Venezuela) Johnny Cecotto	BMW 318iS	1.51.24
8	23	(Germany) Michael Bartels	Nissan Primera eGT	1.51.25
9	7	(Belgium) Thierry Boutsen	Ford Mondeo Ghia	1.51.36
10	22	(Germany) Altfrid Heger	BMW 318iS	1.52.17
11	32	(Belgium) Thierry Tassin	BMW 318iS	1.52.32
12	6	(Germany) Bruno Eichmann	Ford Mondeo Ghia	1.52.44
13	3	(Germany) Alexander Burgstaller	BMW 318iS	1.52.63
14	31	(Italy) Marc Duez	BMW 318iS	1.52.98
15	27	(Germany) Marco Werner	Opel Astra	1.53.27
16	8	(Switzerland) Yolanda Surer	BMW 318iS	1.56.33
17	15	(Germany) Mario Hebler	Opel Astra	2.00.09

Race

Pos	No	Driver	Constructor	Time/Retired	Points
1	4	(Germany) Frank Biela	Audi 80 Quattro	18 laps in 33:39.590	20
2	44	(Germany) Hans-Joachim Stuck	Audi 80 Quattro	+0.64s	15
3	5	(Italy) Emanuele Pirro	Audi 80 Quattro	+1.16s	12
4	45	(Germany) Patrick Bernhardt	Audi 80 Quattro	+2.35s	10
5	9	(Germany) Markus Oestreich	Ford Mondeo Ghia	+14.08s	8
6	24	(Italy) Ivan Capelli	Nissan Primera eGT	+29.04s	6
7	23	(Germany) Michael Bartels	Nissan Primera eGT	+35.00s	4
8	11	(Germany) Altfrid Heger	BMW 318iS	+33.97s	3
9	31	(Italy) Marc Duez	BMW 318iS	+1.02.470s	2
10	3	(Germany) Alexander Burgstaller	BMW 318iS	+1.22.220s	1
11	7	(Belgium) Thierry Boutsen	Ford Mondeo Ghia	+1 lap	
12	8	(Switzerland) Yolanda Surer	BMW 318iS	+1 lap	
DNF	2	(Venezuela) Johnny Cecotto	BMW 318iS	+3 laps	
DNF	6	(Germany) Bruno Eichmann	Ford Mondeo Ghia	+7 laps	
DNF	15	(Germany) Mario Hebler	Opel Astra	+10 laps	
DNF	32	(Belgium) Thierry Tassin	BMW 318iS	+15 laps	
DNF	27	(Germany) Marco Werner	Opel Astra	+16 laps	

- Fastest Lap: Patrick Bernhardt in 1.50.730

=== Championship standings after Round 2 ===
Drivers' Championship standings

Pos	Driver	Points
1	(Germany) Frank Biela	40
2	(Italy) Emanuele Pirro	27
3	(Germany) Hans-Joachim Stuck	21
4	(Germany) Markus Oestreich	16
5	(Italy) Rinaldo Capello	12

Constructors' Championship standings

Pos	Constructor	Points
1	(Germany) Audi	70
2	(United States) Ford	26
3	(Germany) BMW	12
4	(Japan) Nissan	10
5	(Germany) Opel	0

== Round 3 | (Belgium) Zolder ==
Qualifying

Pos	No	Driver	Car	Lap Time
1	5	(Italy) Emanuele Pirro	Audi 80 Quattro	1.45.38
2	11	(Germany) Altfrid Heger	BMW 318iS	1.45.61
3	4	(Germany) Frank Biela	Audi 80 Quattro	1.45.86
4	2	(Venezuela) Johnny Cecotto	BMW 318iS	1.41.90
5	9	(Germany) Markus Oestreich	Ford Mondeo Ghia	1.45.97
6	23	(Germany) Michael Bartels	Nissan Primera eGT	1.46.06
7	7	(Belgium) Thierry Boutsen	Ford Mondeo Ghia	1.46.17
8	44	(Germany) Hans-Joachim Stuck	Audi 80 Quattro	1.46.34
9	3	(Germany) Alexander Burgstaller	BMW 318iS	1.46.55
10	24	(Italy) Ivan Capelli	Nissan Primera eGT	1.47.05
11	40	(Italy) Rinaldo Capello	Audi 80 Quattro	1.47.30
12	6	(Germany) Bruno Eichmann	Ford Mondeo Ghia	1.47.32
13	41	(Belgium) Philippe Adams	Audi 80 Quattro	1.47.38
14	45	(Germany) Patrick Bernhardt	Audi 80 Quattro	1.47.52
15	27	(Germany) Marco Werner	Opel Astra	1.49.26
16	26	(Czech Republic) Miloš Bychl	BMW 318iS	1.49.82
17	8	(Switzerland)	BMW 318iS	1.50.38
18	33	(Switzerland) René Hollinger	Mitsubishi Lancer GTi	1.50.38
19	30	(Germany) Klaus Panchyrz	Ford Mondeo Ghia	no time

Race

Pos	No	Driver	Constructor	Time/Retired	Points
1	2	(Venezuela) Johnny Cecotto	BMW 318iS	22 laps in 39:18.950	20
2	4	(Germany) Frank Biela	Audi 80 Quattro	+3.92s	15
3	5	(Italy) Emanuele Pirro	Audi 80 Quattro	+18.30s	12
4	11	(Germany) Altfrid Heger	BMW 318iS	+30.68s	10
5	44	(Germany) Hans-Joachim Stuck	Audi 80 Quattro	+50.98s	8
6	41	(Belgium) Philippe Adams	Audi 80 Quattro	+54.90s	6
7	40	(Italy) Rinaldo Capello	Audi 80 Quattro	+1.02.53s	4
8	45	(Germany) Patrick Bernhardt	Audi 80 Quattro	+1.09.02s	3
9	9	(Germany) Markus Oestreich	Ford Mondeo Ghia	+1.10.56s	2
10	27	(Germany) Marco Werner	Opel Astra	+1.18.58s	1
11	8	(Switzerland)	BMW 318iS	+1.39.02s	
12	30	(Germany) Klaus Panchyrz	Ford Mondeo Ghia	+1 lap	
13	26	(Czech Republic) Miloš Bychl	BMW 318iS	+2 laps	
14	7	(Belgium) Thierry Boutsen	Ford Mondeo Ghia	+2 laps	
15	33	(Switzerland) René Hollinger	Mitsubishi Lancer GTi	+2 laps	
DNF	23	(Germany) Michael Bartels	Nissan Primera eGT	+5 laps	
DNF	3	(Germany) Alexander Burgstaller	BMW 318iS	+7 laps	
DNF	6	(Germany) Bruno Eichmann	Ford Mondeo Ghia	+12 laps	
DNF	24	(Italy) Ivan Capelli	Nissan Primera eGT	+13 laps	

- Fastest Lap: Frank Biela in 1.45.900

=== Championship standings after Round 3 ===
Drivers' Championship standings

Pos	Driver	Points
1	(Germany) Frank Biela	55
2	(Italy) Emanuele Pirro	39
3	(Germany) Hans-Joachim Stuck	29
4	(Venezuela) Johnny Cecotto	23
5	(Germany) Markus Oestreich	18

Constructors' Championship standings

Pos	Constructor	Points
1	(Germany) Audi	97
2	(Germany) BMW	42
3	(United States) Ford	28
4	(Japan) Nissan	10
5	(Germany) Opel	1

== Round 4 | (Netherlands) Zandvoort ==
Qualifying

Pos	No	Driver	Car	Lap Time
1	4	(Germany) Frank Biela	Audi 80 Quattro	1:08.87
2	5	(Italy) Emanuele Pirro	Audi 80 Quattro	1:09.20
3	2	(Venezuela) Johnny Cecotto	BMW 318iS	1:09.22
4	3	(Germany) Alexander Burgstaller	BMW 318iS	1:09.23
5	40	(Italy) Rinaldo Capello	Audi 80 Quattro	1:09.23
6	45	(Germany) Patrick Bernhardt	Audi 80 Quattro	1:09.38
7	11	(Germany) Altfrid Heger	BMW 318iS	1:09.50
8	23	(Germany) Michael Bartels	Nissan Primera eGT	1:09.57
9	9	(Germany) Markus Oestreich	Ford Mondeo Ghia	1:09.75
10	7	(Belgium) Thierry Boutsen	Ford Mondeo Ghia	1:09.96
11	24	(Italy) Ivan Capelli	Nissan Primera eGT	1:10.01
12	44	(Germany) Hans-Joachim Stuck	Audi 80 Quattro	1:10.02
13	6	(Germany) Bruno Eichmann	Ford Mondeo Ghia	1:10.18
14	30	(Germany) Klaus Panchyrz	Ford Mondeo Ghia	1:10.44
15	22	(Netherlands) Raymond Coronel	Nissan Primera eGT	1:10.64
16	18	(Netherlands) Patrick Huisman	BMW 318iS	1:11.07
17	8	(Switzerland) Yolanda Surer	BMW 318iS	1:11.27
18	27	(Germany) Marco Werner	Opel Astra	1:11.66

Race

Pos	No	Driver	Constructor	Time/Retired	Points
1	4	(Germany) Frank Biela	Audi 80 Quattro	38 laps in 49:11.860	20
2	5	(Italy) Emanuele Pirro	Audi 80 Quattro	+0.90s	15
3	2	(Venezuela) Johnny Cecotto	BMW 318iS	+1.10s	12
4	3	(Germany) Alexander Burgstaller	BMW 318iS	+1.56s	10
5	9	(Germany) Markus Oestreich	Ford Mondeo Ghia	+10.85s	8
6	11	(Germany) Altfrid Heger	BMW 318iS	+12.81s	6
7	30	(Germany) Klaus Panchyrz	Ford Mondeo Ghia	+17.14s	4
8	27	(Germany) Marco Werner	Opel Astra	+18.95s	3
9	6	(Germany) Bruno Eichmann	Ford Mondeo Ghia	+23.17s	2
10	45	(Germany) Patrick Bernhardt	Audi 80 Quattro	+29.67s	1
11	18	(Netherlands) Patrick Huisman	BMW 318iS	+30.09s	
12	8	(Switzerland) Yolanda Surer	BMW 318iS	+31.91s	
13	22	(Netherlands) Raymond Coronel	Nissan Primera eGT	+37.28s	
14	23	(Germany) Michael Bartels	Nissan Primera eGT	+1 lap	
15	40	(Italy) Rinaldo Capello	Audi 80 Quattro	+1 lap	
DNF	44	(Germany) Hans-Joachim Stuck	Audi 80 Quattro	+12 laps	
DNF	7	(Belgium) Thierry Boutsen	Ford Mondeo Ghia	+12 laps	
DNF	24	(Italy) Ivan Capelli	Nissan Primera eGT	+17 laps	

- Fastest Lap: Rinaldo Capello in 1.09.980

=== Championship standings after Round 4 ===
Drivers' Championship standings

Pos	Driver	Points
1	(Germany) Frank Biela	75
2	(Italy) Emanuele Pirro	54
3	(Venezuela) Johnny Cecotto	35
4	(Germany) Hans-Joachim Stuck	29
5	(Germany) Markus Oestreich	26

Constructors' Championship standings

Pos	Constructor	Points
1	(Germany) Audi	132
2	(Germany) BMW	64
3	(United States) Ford	40
4	(Japan) Nissan	28
5	(Germany) Opel	4

== Round 5 | (Austria) Österreichring ==
Qualifying

Pos	No	Driver	Car	Lap Time
1	11	(Germany) Altfrid Heger	BMW 318iS	1:55.77
2	23	(Germany) Michael Bartels	Nissan Primera eGT	1:56.07
3	24	(Italy) Ivan Capelli	Nissan Primera eGT	1:56.07
4	7	(Belgium) Thierry Boutsen	Ford Mondeo Ghia	1:56.66
5	25	(Germany) Joachim Winkelhock	BMW 318iS	1:56.79
6	5	(Italy) Emanuele Pirro	Audi 80 Quattro	1:56.82
7	2	(Venezuela) Johnny Cecotto	BMW 318iS	1:56.98
8	3	(Germany) Alexander Burgstaller	BMW 318iS	1:57.03
9	4	(Germany) Frank Biela	Audi 80 Quattro	1:57.18
10	6	(Germany) Bruno Eichmann	Ford Mondeo Ghia	1:57.34
11	9	(Germany) Markus Oestreich	Ford Mondeo Ghia	1:57.47
12	30	(Germany) Klaus Panchyrz	Ford Mondeo Ghia	1:57.56
13	45	(Germany) Patrick Bernhardt	Audi 80 Quattro	1:58.47
14	20	(Austria) Dieter Quester	BMW 318iS	1:58.49
15	40	(Italy) Rinaldo Capello	Audi 80 Quattro	1:58.54
16	8	(Switzerland) Yolanda Surer	BMW 318iS	1:59.65
17	27	(Germany) Marco Werner	Opel Astra	2:00.00
18	12	(Czech Republic) Vaclad Bervid	BMW 318iS	2:00.97
19	29	(Germany) Michael Heigert	BMW 318iS	2:10.50

Race

Pos	No	Driver	Constructor	Time/Retired	Points
1	11	(Germany) Altfrid Heger	BMW 318iS	16 laps in 31:30.67	20
2	23	(Germany) Michael Bartels	Nissan Primera eGT	+2.93s	15
3	2	(Venezuela) Johnny Cecotto	BMW 318iS	+3.91s	12
4	5	(Italy) Emanuele Pirro	Audi 80 Quattro	+4.38s	10
5	25	(Germany) Joachim Winkelhock	BMW 318iS	+6.87s	8
6	3	(Germany) Alexander Burgstaller	BMW 318iS	+7.93s	6
7	7	(Belgium) Thierry Boutsen	Ford Mondeo Ghia	+7.97s	4
8	24	(Italy) Ivan Capelli	Nissan Primera eGT	+15.46s	3
9	9	(Germany) Markus Oestreich	Ford Mondeo Ghia	+18.23s	2
10	4	(Germany) Frank Biela	Audi 80 Quattro	+18.48s	1
11	6	(Germany) Bruno Eichmann	Ford Mondeo Ghia	+28.08s	
12	40	(Italy) Rinaldo Capello	Audi 80 Quattro	+33.00s	
13	45	(Germany) Patrick Bernhardt	Audi 80 Quattro	+43.29s	
14	8	(Switzerland) Yolanda Surer	BMW 318iS	+59.74s	
15	27	(Germany) Marco Werner	Opel Astra	+1.02.42s	
16	20	(Austria) Dieter Quester	BMW 318iS	+1 lap	
17	12	(Czech Republic) Vaclav Bervid	BMW 318iS	+7 laps	
DNF	29	(Germany) Michael Heigert	BMW 318iS	+7 laps	
DNF	30	(Germany) Klaus Panchyrz	Ford Mondeo Ghia	+11 laps	

- Fastest Lap: Ivan Capelli in 1.56.860

=== Championship standings after Round 5 ===
Drivers' Championship standings

Pos	Driver	Points
1	(Germany) Frank Biela	76
2	(Italy) Emanuele Pirro	64
3	(Venezuela) Johnny Cecotto	47
4	(Germany) Altfrid Heger	41
5	(Germany) Hans-Joachim Stuck	29

Constructors' Championship standings

Pos	Constructor	Points
1	(Germany) Audi	143
2	(Germany) BMW	96
3	(United States) Ford	46
4	(Japan) Nissan	28
5	(Germany) Opel	4

== Round 6 | (Austria) Salzburgring ==
Qualifying

Pos	No	Driver	Car	Lap Time
1	5	(Italy) Emanuele Pirro	Audi 80 Quattro	1:22.51
2	2	(Venezuela) Johnny Cecotto	BMW 318iS	1:22.72
3	14	(Netherlands) Peter Kox	BMW 318iS	1:22.77
4	11	(Germany) Altfrid Heger	BMW 318iS	1:22.79
5	3	(Germany) Alexander Burgstaller	BMW 318iS	1:22.96
6	4	(Germany) Frank Biela	Audi 80 Quattro	1:23.01
7	9	(Germany) Markus Oestreich	Ford Mondeo Ghia	1:23.01
8	23	(Germany) Michael Bartels	Nissan Primera eGT	1:23.47
9	7	(Belgium) Thierry Boutsen	Ford Mondeo Ghia	1:23.66
10	40	(Italy) Rinaldo Capello	Audi 80 Quattro	1:23.71
11	30	(Germany) Klaus Panchyrz	Ford Mondeo Ghia	1:23.74
12	6	(Germany) Bruno Eichmann	Ford Mondeo Ghia	1:23.85
13	43	(Austria) Oliver Tichy	Audi 80 Quattro	1:24.07
14	45	(Germany) Patrick Bernhardt	Audi 80 Quattro	1:24.31
15	24	(Italy) Ivan Capelli	Nissan Primera eGT	1:24.51
16	8	(Switzerland) Yolanda Surer	BMW 318iS	1:24.92
17	26	(Czech Republic) Miloš Bychl	BMW 318iS	1:24.99
18	27	(Germany) Marco Werner	Opel Astra	1:25.88
19	20	(Austria) Dieter Quester	BMW 318iS	1:32.94
20	29	(Germany) Michael Heigert	BMW 318iS	no time

Race

Pos	No	Driver	Constructor	Time/Retired	Points
1	2	(Venezuela) Johnny Cecotto	BMW 318iS	22 laps in 31:05.06	20
2	11	(Germany) Altfrid Heger	BMW 318iS	+4.77s	15
3	9	(Germany) Markus Oestreich	Ford Mondeo Ghia	+13.32s	12
4	23	(Germany) Michael Bartels	Nissan Primera eGT	+16.00s	10
5	14	(Netherlands) Peter Kox	BMW 318iS	+19.97s	8
6	7	(Belgium) Thierry Boutsen	Ford Mondeo Ghia	+21.30s	6
7	30	(Germany) Klaus Panchyrz	Ford Mondeo Ghia	+34.79s	4
8	6	(Germany) Bruno Eichmann	Ford Mondeo Ghia	+34.84s	3
9	24	(Italy) Ivan Capelli	Nissan Primera eGT	+35.28s	2
10	43	(Austria) Oliver Tichy	Audi 80 Quattro	+37.28s	1
11	45	(Germany) Patrick Bernhardt	Audi 80 Quattro	+41.24s	
12	8	(Switzerland) Yolanda Surer	BMW 318iS	+47.87s	
13	20	(Austria) Dieter Quester	BMW 318iS	+1.04.75s	
14	26	(Czech Republic) Miloš Bychl	BMW 318iS	+1.05.66s	
15	4	(Germany) Frank Biela	Audi 80 Quattro	+1 lap	
DNF	40	(Italy) Rinaldo Capello	Audi 80 Quattro	+5 laps	
DNF	5	(Italy) Emanuele Pirro	Audi 80 Quattro	+22 laps	
DNF	3	(Germany) Alexander Burgstaller	BMW 318iS	+22 laps	
DNS	27	(Germany) Marco Werner	Opel Astra		
DNS	29	(Germany) Michael Heigert	BMW 318iS		

- Fastest Lap: Frank Biela in 1.23.510

=== Championship standings after Round 6 ===
Drivers' Championship standings

Pos	Driver	Points
1	(Germany) Frank Biela	76
2	(Venezuela) Johnny Cecotto	67
3	(Italy) Emanuele Pirro	64
4	(Germany) Altfrid Heger	56
5	(Germany) Markus Oestreich	40

Constructors' Championship standings

Pos	Constructor	Points
1	(Germany) Audi	144
2	(Germany) BMW	131
3	(United States) Ford	64
4	(Japan) Nissan	40
5	(Germany) Opel	4

== Round 7 | (Belgium) Spa-Francorchamps ==
Qualifying

Pos	No	Driver	Car	Lap Time
1	2	(Venezuela) Johnny Cecotto	BMW 318iS	2:31.62
2	3	(Germany) Alexander Burgstaller	BMW 318iS	2:32.55
3	11	(Germany) Altfrid Heger	BMW 318iS	2:32.57
4	4	(Germany) Frank Biela	Audi 80 Quattro	2:32.81
5	15	(Italy) Roberto Ravaglia	BMW 318iS	2:33.13
6	5	(Italy) Emanuele Pirro	Audi 80 Quattro	2:33.28
7	14	(Netherlands) Peter Kox	BMW 318iS	2:33.48
8	23	(Germany) Michael Bartels	Nissan Primera eGT	2:34.06
9	7	(Belgium) Thierry Boutsen	Ford Mondeo Ghia	2:34.13
10	44	(Germany) Hans-Joachim Stuck	Audi 80 Quattro	2:34.58
11	18	(Netherlands) Patrick Huisman	BMW 318iS	2:34.67
12	40	(Italy) Rinaldo Capello	Audi 80 Quattro	2:34.70
13	9	(Germany) Markus Oestreich	Ford Mondeo Ghia	2:35.24
14	24	(Italy) Ivan Capelli	Nissan Primera eGT	2:36.17
15	45	(Germany) Patrick Bernhardt	Audi 80 Quattro	2:36.39
16	6	(Germany) Bruno Eichmann	Ford Mondeo Ghia	2:37.09
17	30	(Germany) Klaus Panchyrz	Ford Mondeo Ghia	2:39.45
18	27	(Germany) Marco Werner	Opel Astra	2:39.85
19	8	(Switzerland) Yolanda Surer	BMW 318iS	2:41.55
20	29	(Germany) Michael Heigert	BMW 318iS	2:43.72

Race

Pos	No	Driver	Constructor	Time/Retired	Points
1	2	(Venezuela) Johnny Cecotto	BMW 318iS	12 laps in 30:51.57	20
2	11	(Germany) Altfrid Heger	BMW 318iS	+10.85s	15
3	3	(Germany) Alexander Burgstaller	BMW 318iS	+11.08s	12
4	4	(Germany) Frank Biela	Audi 80 Quattro	+11.94s	10
5	5	(Italy) Emanuele Pirro	Audi 80 Quattro	+20.71s	8
6	40	(Italy) Rinaldo Capello	Audi 80 Quattro	+22.28s	6
7	23	(Germany) Michael Bartels	Nissan Primera eGT	+24.37s	4
8	15	(Italy) Roberto Ravaglia	BMW 318iS	+26.09s	3
9	24	(Italy) Ivan Capelli	Nissan Primera eGT	+26.88s	2
10	9	(Germany) Markus Oestreich	Ford Mondeo Ghia	+28.27s	1
11	18	(Netherlands) Patrick Huisman	BMW 318iS	+37.01s	
12	44	(Germany) Hans-Joachim Stuck	Audi 80 Quattro	+43.32s	
13	6	(Germany) Bruno Eichmann	Ford Mondeo Ghia	+48.88s	
14	27	(Germany) Marco Werner	Opel Astra	+1.10.21s	
15	30	(Germany) Klaus Panchyrz	Ford Mondeo Ghia	+1.17.82s	
16	8	(Switzerland) Yolanda Surer	BMW 318iS	+1.17.87s	
17	29	(Germany) Michael Heigert	BMW 318iS	+2.34.23s	
DNF	45	(Germany) Patrick Bernhardt	Audi 80 Quattro	+7 laps	
DNF	14	(Netherlands) Peter Kox	BMW 318iS	+12 laps	
DNF	7	(Belgium) Thierry Boutsen	Ford Mondeo Ghia	+12 laps	

- Fastest Lap: Johnny Cecotto in 2.32.780

=== Championship standings after Round 7 ===
Drivers' Championship standings

Pos	Driver	Points
1	(Venezuela) Johnny Cecotto	87
2	(Germany) Frank Biela	86
3	(Italy) Emanuele Pirro	72
4	(Germany) Altfrid Heger	71
5	(Germany) Markus Oestreich	41

Constructors' Championship standings

Pos	Constructor	Points
1	(Germany) BMW	166
2	(Germany) Audi	162
3	(United States) Ford	65
4	(Japan) Nissan	46
5	(Germany) Opel	4

== Round 8 | (Germany) Nürburgring ==
Qualifying

Pos	No	Driver	Car	Lap Time
1	2	(Venezuela) Johnny Cecotto	BMW 318iS	1:11.01
2	11	(Germany) Altfrid Heger	BMW 318iS	1:11.18
3	5	(Italy) Emanuele Pirro	Audi 80 Quattro	1:11.35
4	4	(Germany) Frank Biela	Audi 80 Quattro	1:11.71
5	44	(Germany) Hans-Joachim Stuck	Audi 80 Quattro	1:11.76
6	45	(Germany) Patrick Bernhardt	Audi 80 Quattro	1:11.85
7	40	(Italy) Rinaldo Capello	Audi 80 Quattro	1:11.86
8	23	(Germany) Michael Bartels	Nissan Primera eGT	1:11.89
9	25	(Germany) Joachim Winkelhock	BMW 318iS	1:12.06
10	3	(Germany) Alexander Burgstaller	BMW 318iS	1:12.06
11	14	(Netherlands) Peter Kox	BMW 318iS	1:12.18
12	19	(Italy) Franz Engstler	BMW 318iS	1:12.35
13	9	(Germany) Markus Oestreich	Ford Mondeo Ghia	1:12.61
14	6	(Germany) Bruno Eichmann	Ford Mondeo Ghia	1:12.69
15	7	(Belgium) Thierry Boutsen	Ford Mondeo Ghia	1:12.98
16	30	(Germany) Klaus Panchyrz	Ford Mondeo Ghia	1:13.01
17	24	(Italy) Ivan Capelli	Nissan Primera eGT	1:13.02
18	27	(Germany) Marco Werner	Opel Astra	1:13.83
19	36	(Czech Republic) Philipp Muller	Toyota Carina E	1:13.87
20	8	(Switzerland) Yolanda Surer	BMW 318iS	1:14.15
21	26	(Czech Republic) Miloš Bychl	BMW 318iS	1:14.15
22	33	(Czech Republic) René Hollinger	Mitsubishi Lancer GTi	1:14.75
23	29	(Germany) Michael Heigert	BMW 318iS	1:16.40

Race

Pos	No	Driver	Constructor	Time/Retired	Points
1	2	(Venezuela) Johnny Cecotto	BMW 318iS	31 laps in 37:47.87	20
2	5	(Italy) Emanuele Pirro	Audi 80 Quattro	+3.39s	15
3	4	(Germany) Frank Biela	Audi 80 Quattro	+3.79s	12
4	40	(Italy) Rinaldo Capello	Audi 80 Quattro	+25.34s	10
5	24	(Italy) Ivan Capelli	Nissan Primera eGT	+28.52s	8
6	11	(Germany) Altfrid Heger	BMW 318iS	+31.33s	6
7	25	(Germany) Joachim Winkelhock	BMW 318iS	+36.23s	4
8	7	(Belgium) Thierry Boutsen	Ford Mondeo Ghia	+39.05	3
9	9	(Germany) Markus Oestreich	Ford Mondeo Ghia	+41.21s	2
10	45	(Germany) Patrick Bernhardt	Audi 80 Quattro	+42.17s	1
11	14	(Netherlands) Peter Kox	BMW 318iS	+47.18s	
12	19	(Germany) Franz Engstler	BMW 318iS	+1.10.51s	
13	27	(Germany) Marco Werner	Opel Astra	+1 lap	
14	6	(Germany) Bruno Eichmann	Ford Mondeo Ghia	+1 lap	
15	3	(Germany) Alexander Burgstaller	BMW 318iS	+1 lap	
16	26	(Italy) Miloš Bychl	BMW 318iS	+1 lap	
17	33	(Czech Republic) René Hollinger	Mitsubishi Lancer GTi	+1 lap	
18	36	(Czech Republic) Philipp Muller	Toyota Carina E	+1 lap	
19	8	(Switzerland) Yolanda Surer	BMW 318iS	+1 lap	
20	29	(Germany) Michael Heigert	BMW 318iS	+2 laps	
DNF	44	(Germany) Hans-Joachim Stuck	Audi 80 Quattro	+28 laps	
DNF	23	(Germany) Michael Bartels	Nissan Primera eGT	+29 laps	
DNF	30	(Germany) Klaus Panchyrz	Ford Mondeo Ghia	+30 laps	

- Fastest Lap: Johnny Cecotto in 1.11.980

=== Championship standings after Round 8 ===
Drivers' Championship standings

Pos	Driver	Points
1	(Venezuela) Johnny Cecotto	107
2	(Germany) Frank Biela	98
3	(Italy) Emanuele Pirro	87
4	(Germany) Altfrid Heger	77
5	(Germany) Markus Oestreich	43

Constructors' Championship standings

Pos	Constructor	Points
1	(Germany) BMW	192
2	(Germany) Audi	189
3	(United States) Ford	70
4	(Japan) Nissan	54
5	(Germany) Opel	4

== Championship results ==
Points system
**1st**	**2nd**	**3rd**	**4th**	**5th**	**6th**	**7th**	**8th**	**9th**	**10th**
20	15	12	10	8	6	4	3	2	1

Pos	Driver	Car	AVU (Germany)	WUN (Germany)	ZOL (Belgium)	ZAN (Netherlands)	ÖST (Austria)	SAL (Austria)	SPA (Belgium)	NÜR (Germany)	Pts
1	(Venezuela) Johnny Cecotto	BMW	8	Ret	1	3	3	1	**1**	**1**	107
2	(Germany) Frank Biela	Audi	1	1	2	**1**	10	15	4	3	98
3	(Italy) Emanuele Pirro	Audi	**2**	3	**3**	2	4	**Ret**	5	2	87
4	(Germany) Altfrid Heger	BMW	9	8	4	6	**1**	2	2	6	77
5	(Germany) Markus Oestreich	Ford	5	5	9	5	9	3	10	9	43
6	(Germany) Michael Bartels	Nissan	12	7	Ret	14	2	4	7	Ret	33
7	(Italy) Rinaldo Capello	Audi	3		7	15	12	NC	6	4	32
8	(Germany) Hans-Joachim Stuck	Audi	6	2	5	Ret			12	Ret	29
9	(Germany) Alexander Burgstaller	BMW	13	10	Ret	4	6	Ret	3	15	29
10	(Belgium) Thierry Boutsen	Ford	4	11	14	Ret	7	6	Ret	8	23
11	(Italy) Ivan Capelli	Nissan	Ret	6	Ret	Ret	8	9	9	5	21
12	(Germany) Patrick Bernhardt	Audi	11	**4**	8	10	13	11	Ret	10	15
13	(Germany) Joachim Winkelhock	BMW					5			7	12
14	(Germany) Klaus Panchyrz	Ford			12	7	Ret	7	15	Ret	8
15	(Netherlands) Peter Kox	BMW						5	Ret	11	8
16	(Belgium) Philippe Adams	Audi			6						6
17	(Switzerland) Bruno Eichmann	Ford	DNS	Ret	Ret	9	11	8	13	14	5
18	(Belgium) Thierry Tassin	BMW	7	Ret							4
19	(Germany) Marco Werner	Opel	14	Ret	10	8	15	DNS	14	13	4
20	(Italy) Roberto Ravaglia	BMW							8		3
21	(Belgium) Marc Duez	BMW	Ret	9							2
22	(Switzerland) Yolanda Surer	BMW	10	12	11	12	14	12	16	19	1
23	(Austria) Oliver Tichy	Audi						10			1
24	(Netherlands) Patrick Huisman	BMW				11			11		0
25	(Germany) Franz Engstler	BMW								12	0
26	(Czech Republic) Miloš Bychl	BMW			13			14		16	0
27	(Netherlands) Raymond Coronel	Nissan				13					0
28	(Austria) Dieter Quester	BMW					16	13			0
29	(Switzerland) René Hollinger	Mitsubishi			15					17	0
30	(Czech Republic) Vaclav Bervid	BMW					17				0
31	(Germany) Michael Heigert	BMW					Ret	DNS	17	20	0
32	(Switzerland) Phillip Müller	Toyota								18	0
-	(Germany) Mario Hebler	Opel	DNS	Ret							0
Pos	Driver	Car	AVU (Germany)	WUN (Germany)	ZOL (Belgium)	ZAN (Netherlands)	ÖST (Austria)	SAL (Austria)	SPA (Belgium)	NÜR (Germany)	Pts

Colour	Result
Gold	Winner
Silver	Second place
Bronze	Third place
Green	Points classification
Blue	Non-points classification
Blue	Non-classified finish (NC)
Purple	Retired, not classified (Ret)
Red	Did not qualify (DNQ)
Red	Did not pre-qualify (DNPQ)
Black	Disqualified (DSQ)
White	Did not start (DNS)
White	Withdrew (WD)
White	Race cancelled (C)
Blank	Did not practice (DNP)
Blank	Did not arrive (DNA)
Blank	Excluded (EX)

**Bold** – Pole
Italics – Fastest Lap

=== Manufacturers' Trophy ===
Manufactures' Points system
**1st**	**2nd**	**3rd**	**4th**	**5th**	**6th**	**7th**	**8th**	**9th**	**10th**
20	15	12	10	8	6	4	3	2	1

Pos	Manufacturer	AVU (Germany)	WUN (Germany)	ZOL (Belgium)	ZAN (Netherlands)	ÖST (Austria)	SAL (Austria)	SPA (Belgium)	NÜR (Germany)	Pts
1	(Germany) BMW	7	8	1	3	1	1	1	1	192
1	(Germany) BMW	8	9	4	4	3	2	2	6	192
2	(Germany) Audi	1	1	2	1	4	10	4	2	189
2	(Germany) Audi	2	2	3	2	10	Ret	5	3	189
3	(United States) Ford	4	5	9	5	7	3	10	8	70
3	(United States) Ford	5	11	14	7	9	6	13	9	70
4	(Japan) Nissan	12	6	Ret	14	2	4	7	5	54
4	(Japan) Nissan	Ret	7	Ret	Ret	8	9	9	Ret	54
5	(Germany) Opel	14	Ret	10	8	15		14	13	4

Colour	Result
Gold	Winner
Silver	Second place
Bronze	Third place
Green	Points classification
Blue	Non-points classification
Blue	Non-classified finish (NC)
Purple	Retired, not classified (Ret)
Red	Did not qualify (DNQ)
Red	Did not pre-qualify (DNPQ)
Black	Disqualified (DSQ)
White	Did not start (DNS)
White	Withdrew (WD)
White	Race cancelled (C)
Blank	Did not practice (DNP)
Blank	Did not arrive (DNA)
Blank	Excluded (EX)

**Bold** – Pole
Italics – Fastest Lap
