= Philipp Müller =

Philipp Müller may refer to:

- Philipp Müller (politician) (born 1952), Swiss politician
- Philipp Müller (handballer) (born 1984), German handball player
- Philipp Müller (footballer) (born 1995), German footballer
- Philipp Ludwig Statius Müller (1725–1776), German zoologist
- Philipp Wilbrand Jacob Müller (1771–1851), German entomologist
- Philipp Muller (civil servant), director-general of the Pacific Islands Forum Fisheries Agency, 1981–1991
