= Ford Mondeo (first generation) =

First generation of Ford Mondeo

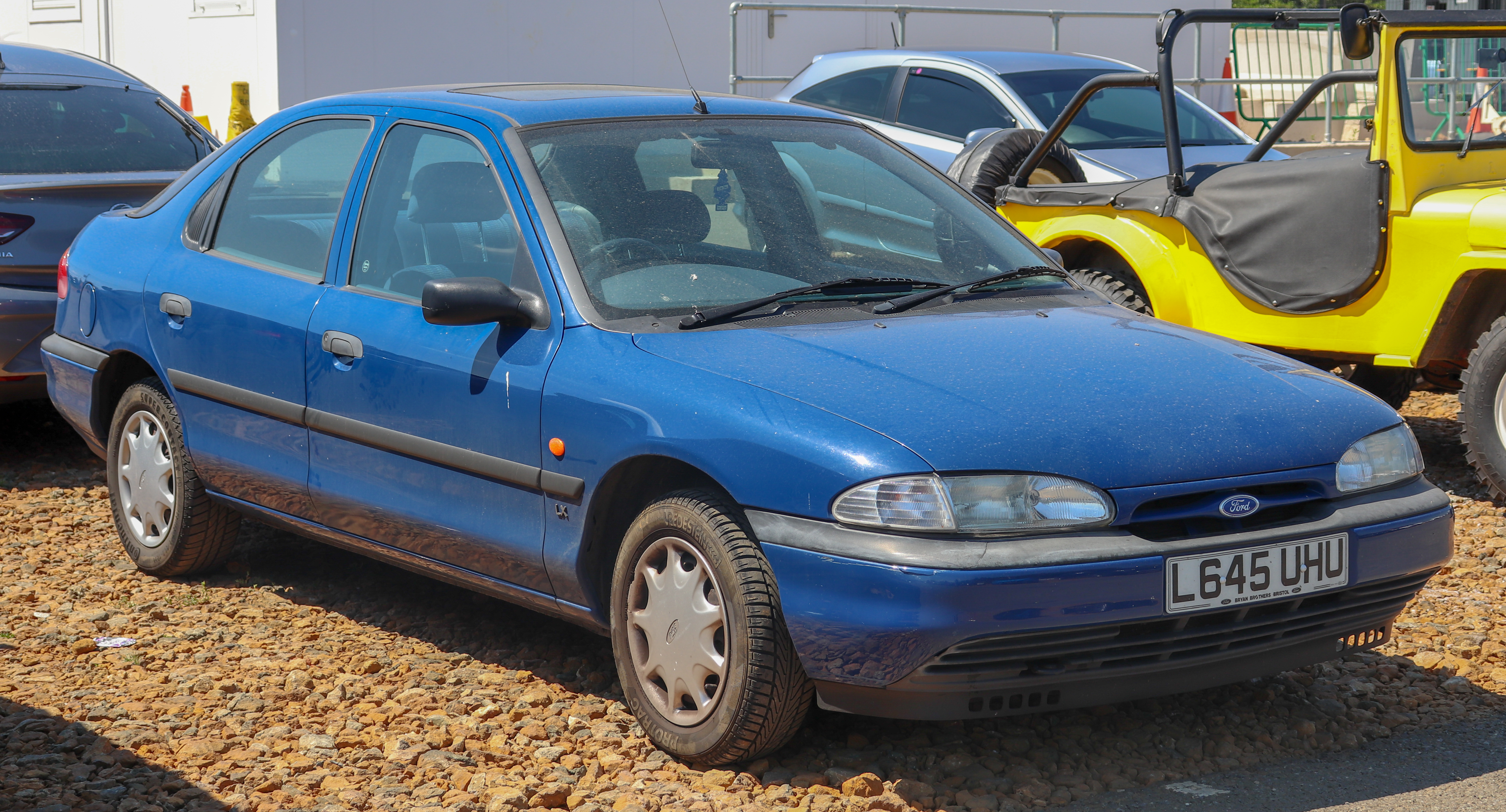

Overview
- Manufacturer: Ford Motor Company
- Also called: Ford Contour (North America and Middle East); Mercury Mystique (North America and Middle East)
- Production: 23 November 1992–31 August 1996 (pre-facelift); 1 September 1996 – 1 November 2000 (facelift)
- Model years: 1993–2001
- Assembly: Belgium: Genk (Genk Body & Assembly); Germany: Cologne (Cologne Body & Assembly); Taiwan: Zhongli (Ford Lio Ho); Mexico: Cuautitlán (Cuautitlán Assembly; Contour); United States: Claycomo, Missouri (Kansas City Assembly; Contour)
- Designer: John Oldfield (engineer) (1989)

Body and chassis
- Class: Midsize (D)
- Body style: 4-door saloon 5-door hatchback 5-door estate
- Layout: FF layout AWD layout
- Platform: Ford CDW27 platform
- Related: Ford Cougar; Mercury Cougar

Powertrain
- Engine: petrol: 1.6 L "Zetec" I4 16V; 1.8 L "Zetec" I4 16V; 2.0 L "Zetec" I4 16V; 2.0 L "Zetec" I4 16V (US); 2.5 L V6 24V; 2.5 L "Duratec" V6 24V (US); diesel: 1.8 L "Endura-D" I4 8V (turbo diesel)
- Transmission: 5-speed MTX-75 manual (US); 4-speed CD4E automatic (US)

Dimensions
- Wheelbase: 2,704 mm (106.5 in)
- Length: 4,481 mm (176.4 in) (1993 saloon, hatch); 4,631 mm (182.3 in) (1993 estate); 4,556 mm (179.4 in) (1996 saloon, hatch); 4,671 mm (183.9 in) (1996 estate)
- Width: 1,747 mm (68.8 in) (1993 saloon, hatch); 1,745 mm (68.7 in) (1993 estate); 1,749 mm (68.9 in) (1996)
- Height: 1,372 mm (54.0 in) (saloon, hatchback); 1,391 mm (54.8 in) (estate)

Chronology
- Predecessor: Ford Sierra (Europe); Ford Tempo/Mercury Topaz (North America); Ford Telstar (Japan, Australia, New Zealand, South Africa)
- Successor: Ford Mondeo (second generation); Ford Fusion (Americas)

The Ford Mondeo I (first generation) is a mid-size car manufactured and marketed by Ford, beginning on 23 November 1992, with sales beginning on 22 March 1993. It is also known as the Mk I Mondeo; the 1996 facelift versions are usually designated Mk II. Available as a four-door saloon, a five-door hatchback, and a five-door estate, all models for the European market were produced at Ford's plant in the Belgian city of Genk.

Intended as a world car, it replaced the Ford Sierra in Europe, the Ford Telstar in a large portion of Asia and other markets, while the Ford Contour and Mercury Mystique replaced the Ford Tempo and Mercury Topaz in North America. Despite being billed as a world car, the only external items the Mondeo shared initially with the Contour were the windscreen, front windows, front mirrors and door handles. Thus, the CDW27 project turned out not to be a true world car in the sense that the original Ford Focus and newer Fords developed under the "One Ford" policy turned out to be. The first generation Mondeo was replaced in 2000, by the larger second generation; in the United States and Canada, the Contour/Mystique were replaced initially by the Focus and later the Fusion.

== Design and development ==
=== Mk I ===
Instigated in 1986 (just before its Sierra predecessor received a major facelift), the design of the car cost Ford US$6 billion. It was one of the most expensive new-car programmes ever. The Mondeo was significant as its design and marketing were shared between Ford USA in Dearborn and Ford of Europe. Its codename while under development reflected thus: CDW27 signified that it straddled the C and D size classes and was a "world car". The head of the Mondeo project was John Oldfield, headquartered at Ford Dunton in Essex. A large proportion of the high development cost was due to the Mondeo being a completely new design, sharing very little, if anything, with the Ford Sierra. Unlike the Sierra, the Mondeo is front-wheel drive in its most common form, with a rarer four-wheel drive version available on the Mk I car only. Over-optimistically, the floor pan was designed to accept virtually any conceivable drivetrain, from a transverse inline-four engine to a longitudinal V-8. This resulted in a hugely intrusive and mostly disused bellhousing cover and transmission tunnel. Resultingly the front interior, especially the footwells, feels more cramped than would be expected from a vehicle of this size. The Mondeo featured new manual and automatic transmissions and sophisticated suspension design, which give it class-leading handling and ride qualities, and subframes front and rear to give it executive car refinement. The automatic transmission featured electronic control with sport and economy modes plus switchable overdrive. The program manager from 1988, and throughout its early development, was David Price.

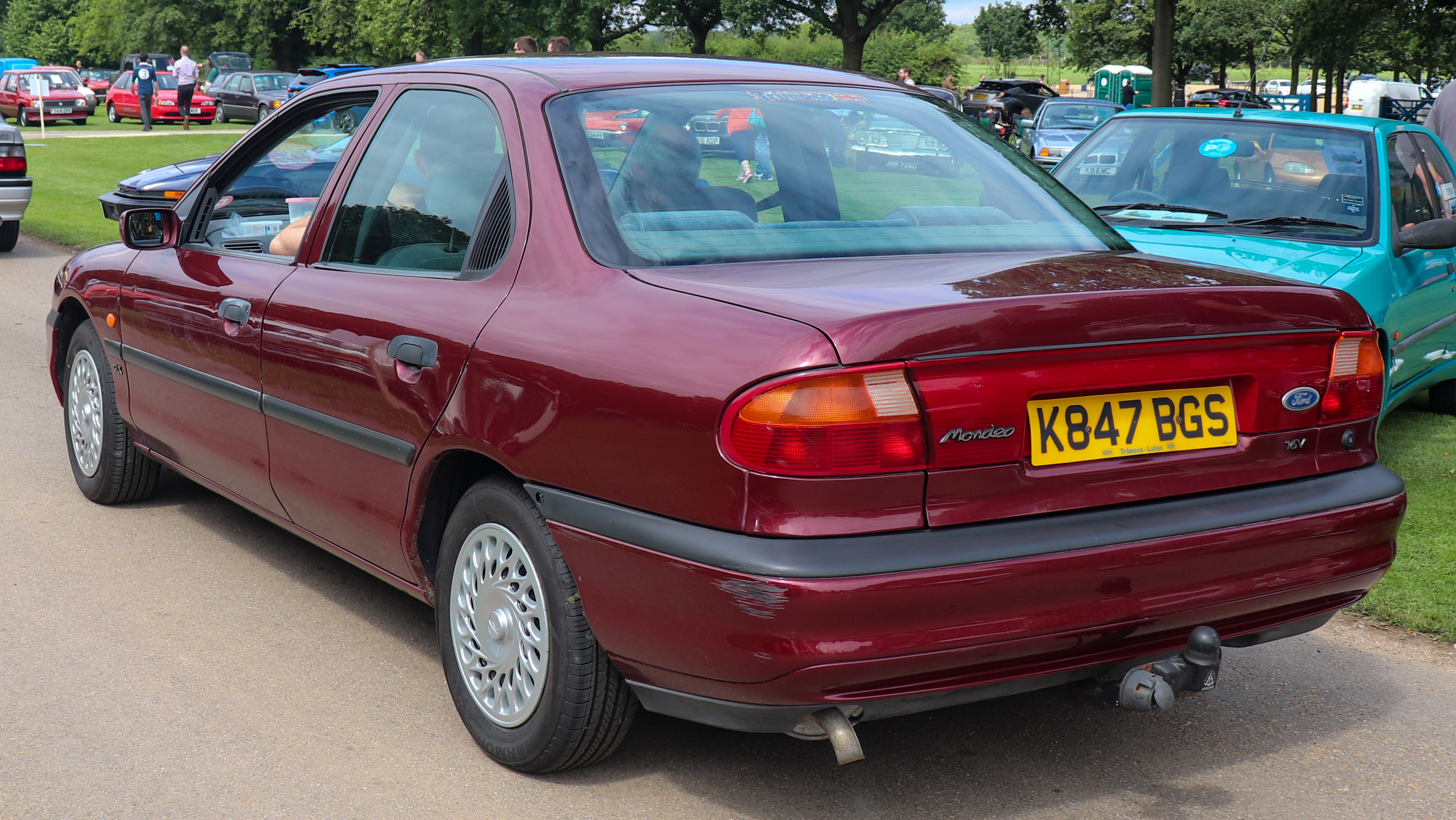
Saloon (pre-facelift)

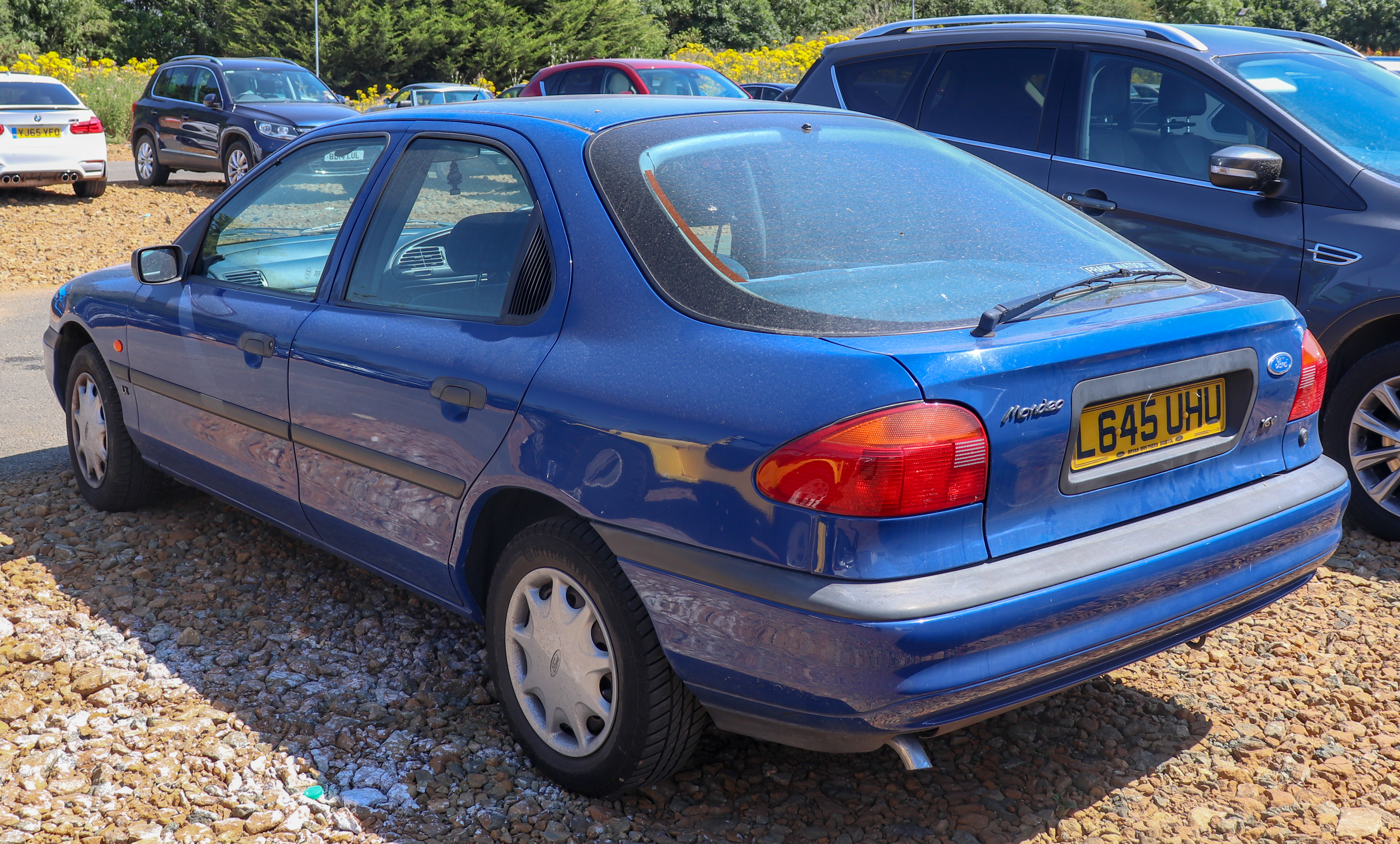
Hatchback (pre-facelift)

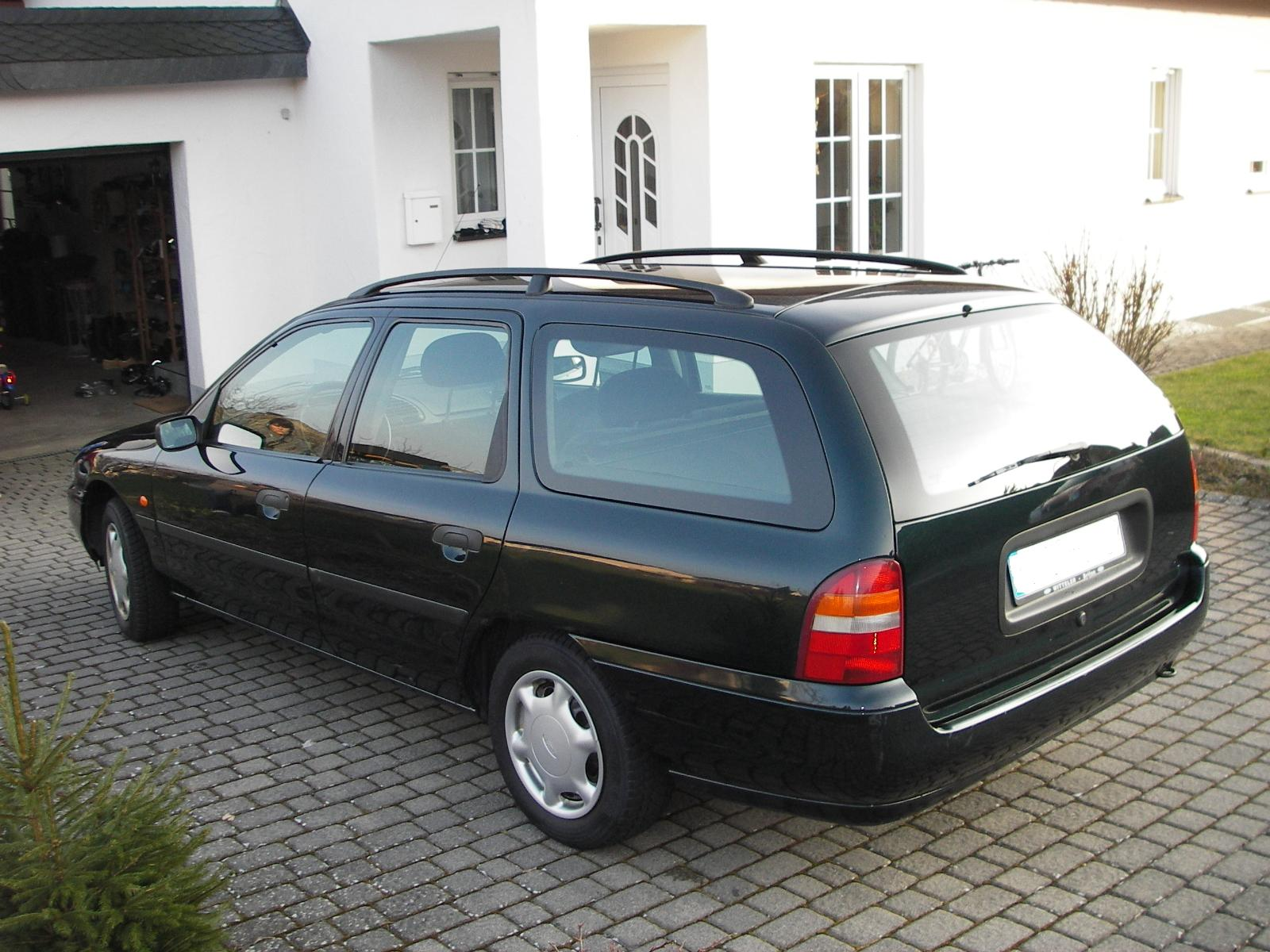
Estate (pre-facelift)

By 1989, Ford had confirmed that it would be launching an all-new front-wheel drive car to replace the Sierra within the next four years, although it had not yet decided whether the Sierra name would continue or be replaced, with some subsequent reports even hinting that the Cortina name could make a comeback, having been axed in 1982 when replaced by the Sierra. Several prototypes were tested that year, but the launch of the Nissan Primera in 1990 prompted Ford to make a number of major alterations to the final product, as it saw the new competitor from Nissan to be the benchmark car in this sector, having previously identified the Honda Accord as the class leader.

The car was launched in the midst of turbulent times at Ford of Europe, when the division was haemorrhaging hundreds of millions of dollars, and had gained a reputation in the motoring press for selling products which had been designed by accountants rather than engineers. The fifth-generation Escort and third-generation Orion of 1990 was the zenith of this cost-cutting/high-price philosophy, which was by then beginning to backfire on Ford, with the cars being slated for their substandard ride and handling, though a facelift in 1992 had seen things improve a little. The Sierra had sold well, but not as well as the all-conquering Cortina before it, and in Britain, it had been overtaken in the sales charts by the newer Vauxhall Cavalier. Previously loyal customers were already turning to rival European and Japanese products, and by the time of the Mondeo's launch, the future of Europe as a Ford manufacturing base was hanging in the balance. The new car had to be good, and it had to sell. It was unveiled to the public on 23 November 1992, although sales would not begin for another four months. At this stage, Ford confirmed that the new car would feature a completely new name and would be called the Mondeo. In December 1992, Autocar published a section on the Mondeo, and how it would conquer rivals.

Safety was a high priority in the Mondeo design, with a driver's side airbag (it was the first-ever car sold from the beginning with a driver's airbag in all of its versions, which helped it achieve the European Car of the Year title for 1994), side-impact bars, seat belt pretensioners, and anti-lock braking systems (higher models) as standard features. Other features for its year included adaptive damping, self-leveling suspension (top estate models), traction control (V6 and 4WD versions), and heated front windscreen, branded Quickclear.

The interiors were usually well-appointed, featuring velour trim, an arm rest with CD and tape storage, central locking (frequently remote), power windows (all round on higher models), power mirrors, illuminated entry, flat-folding rear seats, etc. Higher-specification models had leather seats, trip computers, electric sunroof, CD changer, and alloy wheels.

During its development, Ford used the 1986 Honda Accord and in the later stages the 1990 Nissan Primera as the class benchmarks that the CDW27 had to beat.

=== Mk II (facelift) ===
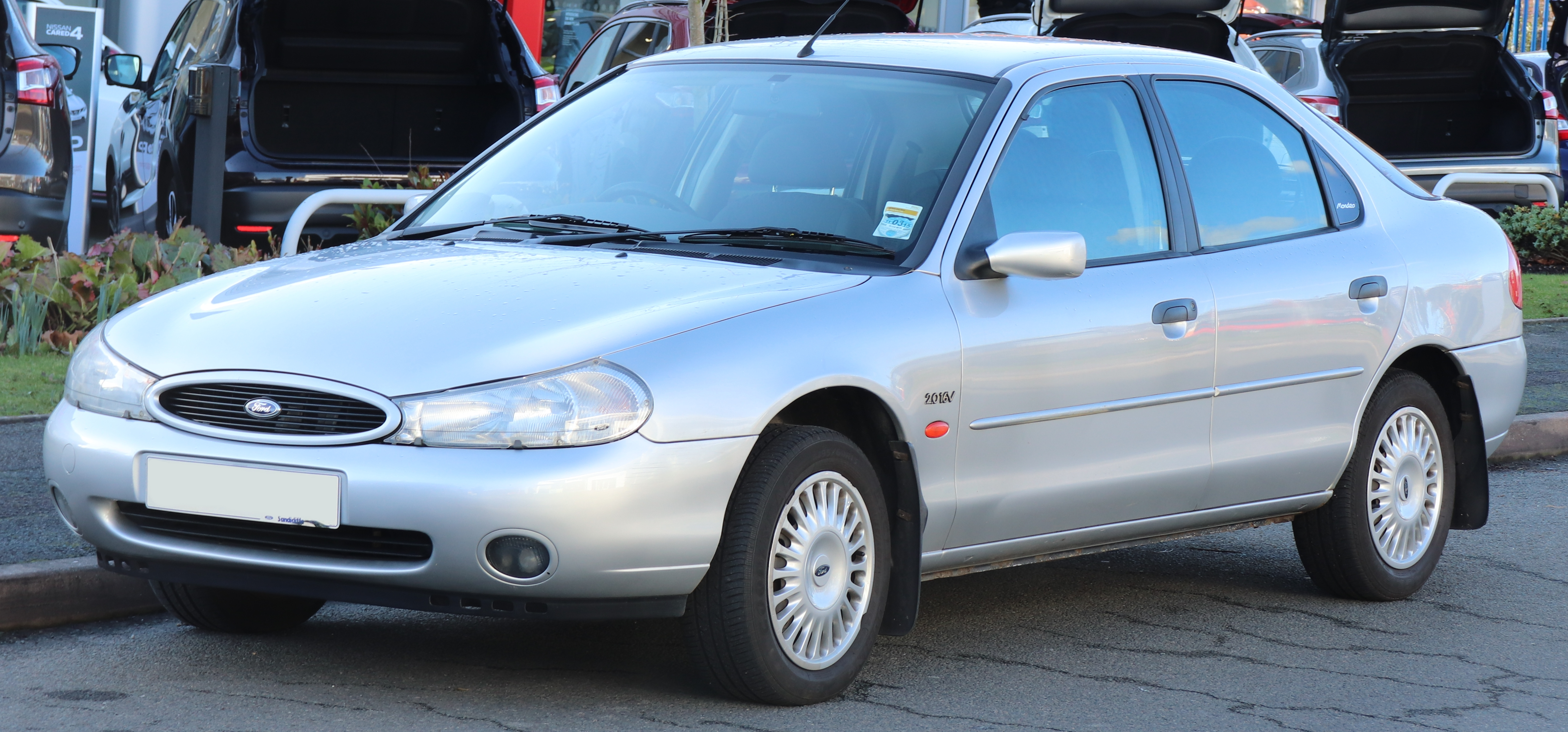
Hatchback (facelift)

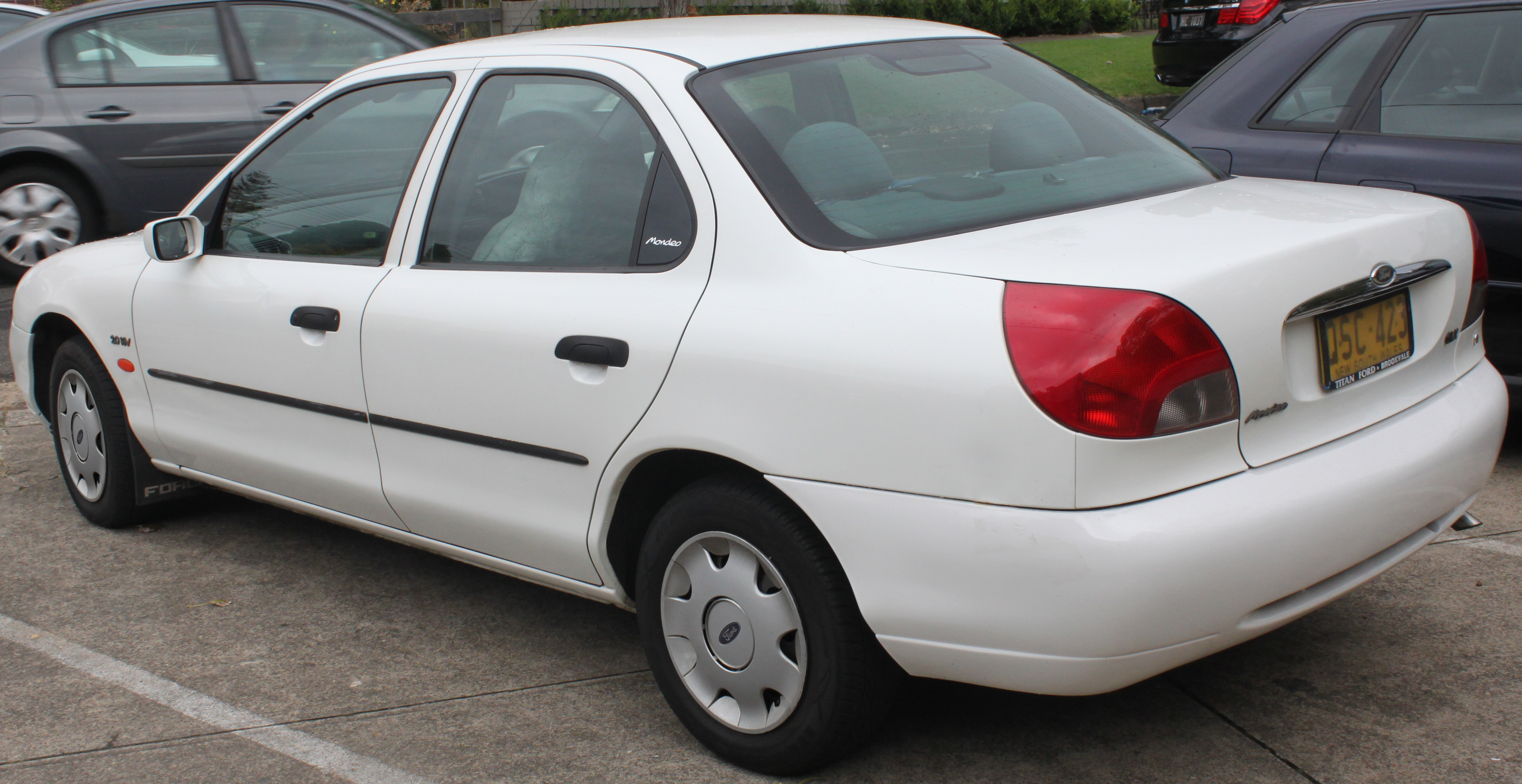
Saloon (facelift)

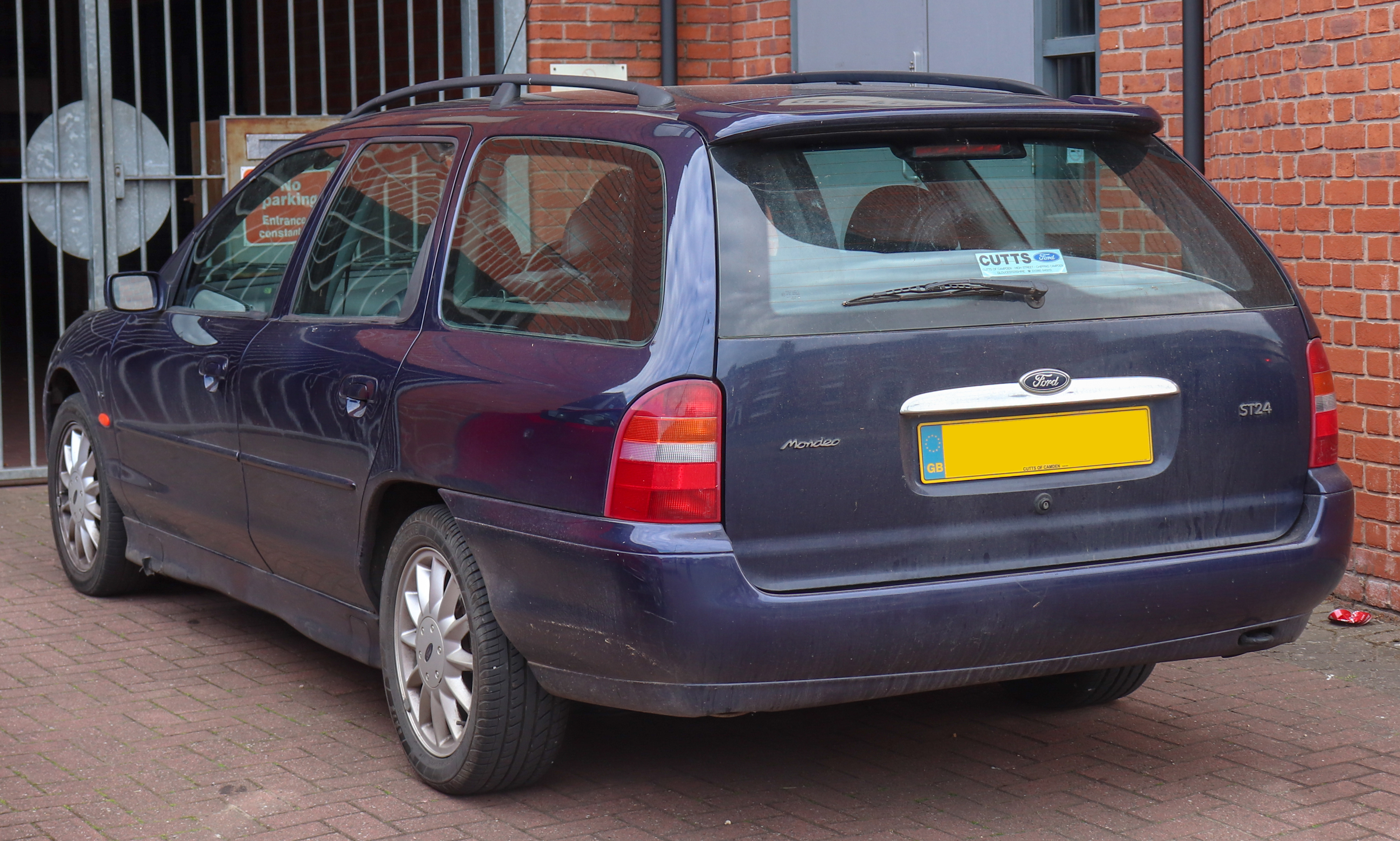
Estate (facelift)

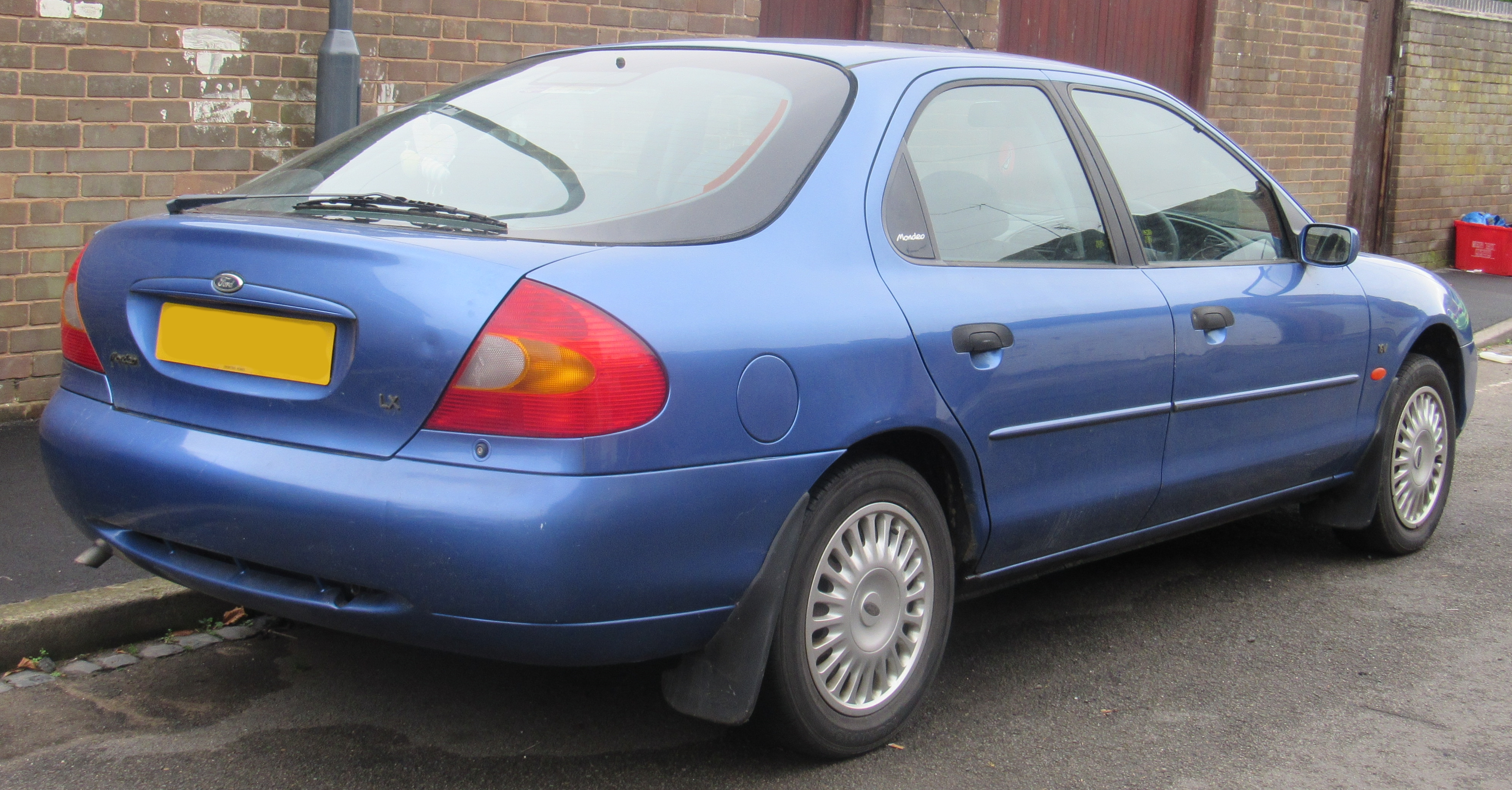
Hatchback (facelift)

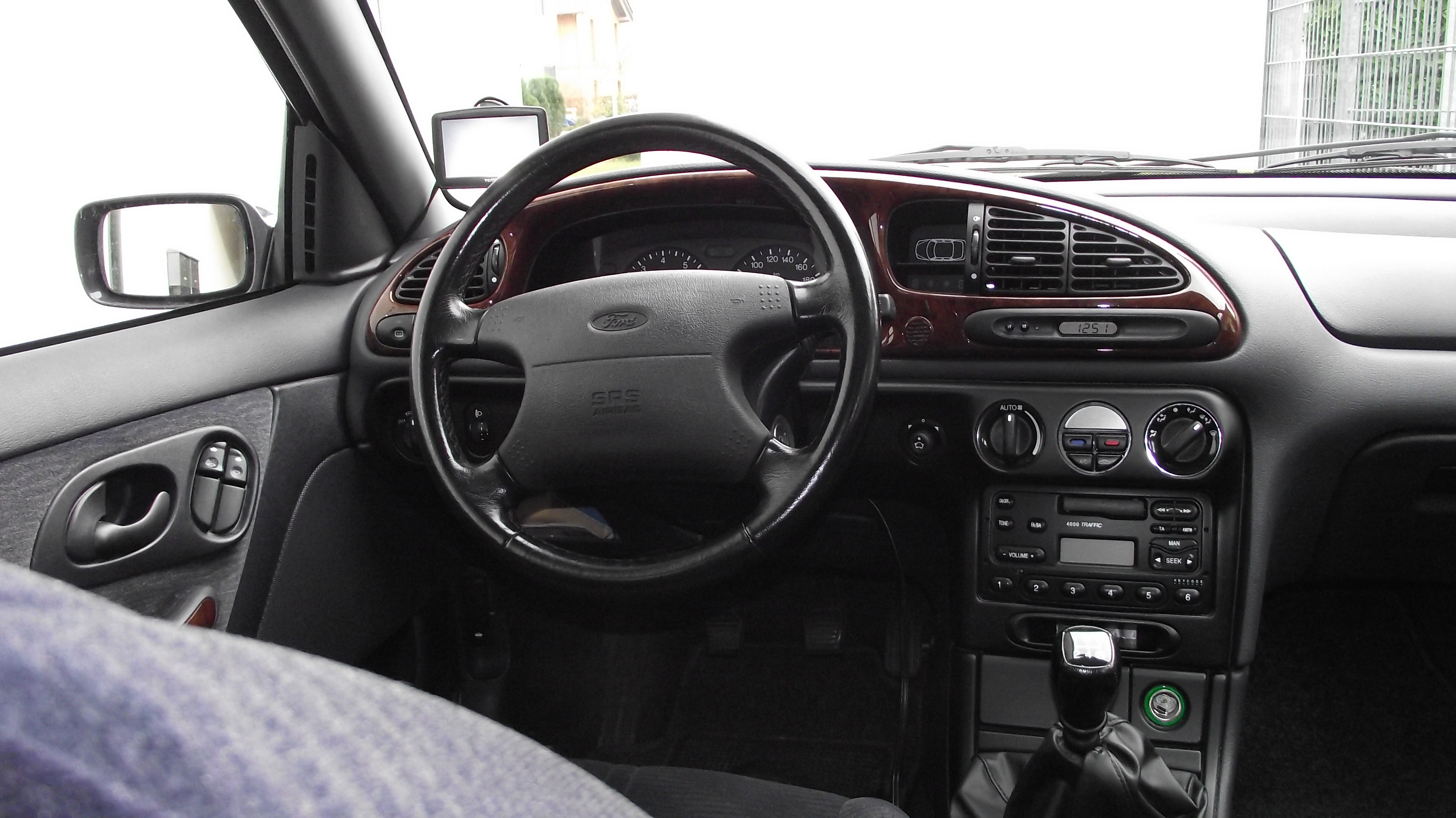
Mk II interior

The mid-cycle facelift, launched in October 1996, addressed three of the original Mondeo's biggest criticisms: its bland styling, the poor headlight performance, the reflectors of which quickly yellowed, and the cramped rear legroom. The lowering of specification levels around that time, such as air conditioning and alloy wheels, became optional on the UK Ghia models. This may have indicated a desire by Ford to cut costs and recoup some considerable sums invested in the original design. These specification levels were improved again in 1998 as the Mondeo approached replacement.

The facelift left only the doors, the roof, and the rear quarter panels on the estate the same as the original model. Even the extractor vents on the rear doors were replaced by a panel bearing the name Mondeo. The most notable change was the introduction of the grille and larger, wraparound lighting units. The saloon version featured some distinctive rear lights. These incorporated an additional reflector panel that extended around the top and the side of the rear wings. Unlike the iterations seen on the heavily facelifted Scorpio and Mk IV Fiesta during the previous year, this facelift was well received.

The interior was also mildly revised, though the basic dashboard architecture was the same as before. Safety specification was improved, with the car gaining a full-sized driver airbag in place of the smaller 'euro-bag' fitted in the Mk I Mondeo. The Mk II gained a 'flagged' three-star rating in Euro NCAP testing, which was average for rivals of its time (the same as the Vauxhall Vectra, better than the Citroën Xantia and Peugeot 406, and worse than the Nissan Primera). The cars' structure suffered excessive footwell intrusion in the frontal impact and a disturbing B-pillar displacement in the side test.

The Zetec engine was thoroughly revised in 1998. The updated version was far more refined at high revolutions. In December 1998, Ford released in Europe a sports car with a coupé body shell based upon the Mk II Mondeo called the Ford Cougar (or Mercury Cougar in North America). This car shared the engines (2.0 I4, 2.5 V6), transmissions, suspension (partially) and floorpans from the Mondeo, but the body shell was unique to the Cougar, and was one of the last Ford cars to be designed under Ford's New Edge philosophy.

== Engines ==
Along with an all-new platform, the Mondeo also used Ford's then-new Zetec engines, first seen in 1991 in the Ford Escort, Ford Orion and Ford Fiesta.

Three versions of the 16-valve Zetec engine were used. The 1.6 L version, rated at 90 PS (66 kW) from the Escort was used, a 1.8 with 115 PS (85 kW) also found in the Escort and Ford Fiesta (105 and 130 metric horsepower (77 and 96 kW)), while a new 136 PS (100 kW) 2.0 L version was launched.

An alternative to the Zetec engines was the Endura-D 1.8 L turbo-diesel. This engine had origins in the older 1.6 L diesel design (which in itself was based on the petrol OHV Kent engine block from the Mk1-2 Escort and Mk1 Fiesta) and was used in the Fiesta and elsewhere. Despite its strengths, it was not seen as a strong competitor to other European diesels such as that produced by Peugeot. The contrast between this unit and the competition seemed enormous by the time the engine was dropped in 2000. Strangely, the diesel-powered vehicles could easily be distinguished by dint of their having a slightly redesigned grille so that more air would flow to the top mounted intercooler.

A new American designed V6 engine was introduced in 1994 as part of a model line-up review, in the form of the 170 metric horsepower (125 kW) 2.5 L 24-valve V6 Duratec unit, primarily included for markets where four-cylinder petrol engines are not favoured and are usually intended for the upmarket European buyer. This engine, first unveiled in the Mondeo's North American cousin, the Ford Contour, is characterized by its smooth operation, chain-driven camshafts, and additional butterflies in the lower inlet to close of the inlet path to one valve, giving better torque at low engine speeds, this was vacuum operated on the Mk1 and electronically controlled on the Mk2. This engine was originally branded 24v on the Mk1, but later on badged as the more glamorous sounding V6.

This engine was also used to introduce the new "ST" brand to the Mondeo range as a flagship model (with less specification than a Ghia or a Ghia X), the ST24 in 1997. The power of the engine stayed at 170 PS (125 kW), the same as other 2.5 L-engined models (so was slower than a Mk I 24v), but the ST featured unique cabin trim (half-leather seats), unique 16-inch alloy wheels (that were originally only available on a Ghia X Estate), and a full Rally Sport Appearance Pack body kit as standard. The bodykit option was listed as a delete option for those who did not want it fitted as standard. This was later replaced by the Limited Edition ST200 in 1999, featuring an SVT version of the V6 Duratec with a power output of 205 PS (151 kW).

Although neither of these models ever sold in high numbers, the marketing was important to Ford, as it was an introduction to the ST range as a sportier side to the full range, especially significant as apart from the Focus RS, both the XR and RS model ranges were phased out during the 1990s.

Ford briefly sold a version using the 2.0 L Zetec engine and four-wheel drive, available between 1995 and 1996 on cars with Si, Ghia, and Ghia X trim and in 1997 on the Mk2 in some European countries.

Model	Years	Engine and type		Displ.	Power	Torque
1.6	1993–1999	I4 16V	Zetec	1597 cc	66 kW (90 PS; 89 hp) @ 5250 rpm	135 N⋅m (100 ft⋅lbf) @ 3500 rpm
1.6	1999–2000	I4 16V	Zetec	1597 cc	70 kW (95 PS; 94 hp) @ 5250 rpm	142 N⋅m (105 ft⋅lbf) @ 3600 rpm
1.8	1993–2000	I4 16V	Zetec	1796 cc	85 kW (116 PS; 114 hp) @ 5750 rpm	158 N⋅m (117 ft⋅lbf) @ 3750 rpm
2.0	1993–1996	I4 16V	Zetec	1988 cc	100 kW (136 PS; 134 hp) @ 6000 rpm	175 N⋅m (129 ft⋅lbf) @ 4000 rpm
2.0	1996–2000	I4 16V	Zetec	1988 cc	96 kW (131 PS; 129 hp) @ 5600 rpm	178 N⋅m (131 ft⋅lbf) @ 4000 rpm
2.0 4x4	1993–1996	I4 16V	Zetec	1988 cc	97 kW (132 PS; 130 hp) @ 6000 rpm	175 N⋅m (129 ft⋅lbf) @ 4000 rpm
2.5	1994–1998	V6 24V	Duratec	2544 cc	125 kW (170 PS; 168 hp) @ 6250 rpm	220 N⋅m (162 ft⋅lbf) @ 4250 rpm
2.5	1998–2000	V6 24V	Duratec	2495 cc	125 kW (170 PS; 168 hp) @ 6250 rpm	220 N⋅m (162 ft⋅lbf) @ 4250 rpm
2.5 ST200	1999–2000	V6 24V	Duratec	2495 cc	151 kW (205 PS; 202 hp) @ 6500 rpm	235 N⋅m (173 ft⋅lbf) @ 5500 rpm
1.8 TD	1993–2000	I4 8V	Endura-D	1753 cc	66 kW (90 PS; 89 hp) @ 4500 rpm	177 N⋅m (131 ft⋅lbf) @ 2250 rpm

== Market ==
=== Europe ===
The 1992–1996 range had the following trim levels:

UK market

- Base – 1.6L Zetec, 1.8 L turbodiesel, base trim level, 4-door saloon, 5-door hatchback, estate (replaced by Aspen in 1995)
- Aspen – 1.6 L Zetec, 1.8 L turbodiesel, base trim level, 5-door hatchback, estate
- LX – 1.6 L/1.8 L/2.0 L Zetec, 1.8 L turbodiesel, midrange trim level, 4-door saloon, 5-door hatchback, estate
- GLX – 1.6 L/1.8 L/2.0 L Zetec, 1.8 L turbodiesel, luxury trim level version of the LX, 4-door saloon, 5-door hatchback, estate
- 24v – 2.5L Duratec V6, 4-door saloon, 5-door hatchback, estate (1994–1995 only) with sports seats and 15” steel wheels and trims
- Si – 2.0 L 4-cylinder with shorter ratio gearbox, 2.5 L Duratec V6 (Sept 1995- Aug 1996 only), sports version, 4-door saloon, 5-door hatchback, estate, optional 4x4 on 2.0L Zetec
- Ghia – 1.8 L/2.0 L Zetec, 2.5 L Duratec V6, 1.8 L turbodiesel, midrange trim level, 4-door saloon, 5-door hatchback, estate, optional 4x4 on 2.0L Zetec
- Ghia X – (1995-1996 only) 2.0L Zetec, 2.5 L Duratec V6, 1.8L turbodiesel, luxury trim level, 4-door saloon, 5-door hatchback, 5-door estate (from 1995), optional 4x4 on 2.0L Zetec

Special edition versions included the 1.8 L Ultima (1993-1994 only) and 1.8 L, 1.8 L turbodiesel Verona (1995-1996 only) models which included a mix of lower and higher model components and exclusive interior trims.

The Mk1 was available with a factory or dealer option, RS bodykit, from 1993 to 1995, consisting of additional front and rear aerodynamic bumper styling which was bonded to the factory bumpers, side skirts and a boot lid mounted spoiler on all body shapes, together with a choice of 15” and 16” alloy wheels. A more subtle bodykit was offered as an option from Sept 1995 to Aug 1996 consisting of complete replacement bumpers with round front fog lights and smooth side skirts, the boot spoilers had an additional high level brake light added.

A special edition version of the 2.0 Si was available in 1993–1994 in limited numbers and came in Citrine Yellow with a special version of the Si seat fabric and included the full RS bodykit, these were issued to each Ford Dealer as a promotional tool for sale and an even smaller number of these cars (~50) were tuned by a dealer, Hendy Ford and fitted with different camshafts, producing approximately 150 PS and were identified by special graphics on the sides.

Additional trim levels in other European markets included:

- Mirage – 1.6 L Zetec, base trim level, 4-door saloon, 5-door hatchback, estate – only offered in the Netherlands
- CLX – 1.6 L/1.8 L/2.0 L Zetec, 1.8 L turbodiesel, midrange trim level, 4-door saloon, 5-door hatchback, estate – not offered in the UK
- Verona – 1.8 L, midrange trim level, 4-door saloon, 5-door hatchback
- GLX – 1.6 L/1.8 L/2.0 L Zetec, 1.8 L turbodiesel, luxury trim level version of the CLX, 4-door saloon, 5-door hatchback, estate
- Business Edition – 1.6 L/1.8 L/2.0 L 4-cylinder, 2.5 L V6, 1.8 L turbodiesel, luxury trim level version of LX, 4-door saloon, 5-door hatchback, estate. – only offered in the Netherlands
- GT – 1.8 L/2.0 L 4-cylinder, 2.5 L V6, 1.8 L turbodiesel, sports version, 4-door saloon, 5-door hatchback, estate. Only offered in the Netherlands, equivalent to UK-spec Si
- V6 – 2.5 L V6, luxury version, 4-door saloon, 5-door hatchback, estate. Never offered with a V6 (base) in the Netherlands, only Business Edition or GT.

The 1996–2000 range had the following trim levels:

- Aspen – 1.6 L Zetec, 1.8 L TD Endura, base trim level, 5dr, Estate
- LX – 1.6/1.8/2.0 L Zetec, 1.8 L TD Endura, midrange trim level, 4dr, 5dr, Estate
- Verona – 1.8 L Zetec, midrange trim level, 5dr
- GLX – 1.8/2.0 L Zetec, 1.8 L TD Endura, midrange trim level, 4dr, 5dr, Estate
- Si – 2.0 L Zetec, 2.5 L V6 170 PS, sports version, 4dr, 5dr, Estate
- Zetec – 1.8/2.0 L Zetec, replaced Si, 5dr, Estate
- Zetec-S – 2.0 L Zetec, rare Zetec based special edition with ST bodykit, 5dr
- Ghia – 2.0 L Zetec, 2.5 L V6 170 PS, 1.8 L TD Endura, luxury trim level
- Ghia X – 2.0 L Zetec, 2.5 L V6 170 PS, 1.8 L TD Endura, top spec trim level
- ST24 – 2.5 L V6 170 PS, Sports Variant Luxury bucket seat half leather trim, sports-suspension, RSAP Kit
- ST200 – 2.5 L V6 205 PS, Sports Variant, Luxury Recaro leather trim, 17" alloys, tuned engine & suspension, RSAP Kit, digital Climate Control

The facelifted Mk II Mondeo sports variants included the ST24 and the ST200. The ST24 produced 170 bhp (130 kW) from its 2.5-litre V6 24v engine and was launched with Rally Sport Appearance Pack body kits, along with sports suspension and half-leather sports bucket seats. Its standard setup had the ST24 from standstill to 62 mph (100 km/h) in 8.0 seconds, coupled with a maximum speed of 148 mph (238 km/h). North America got an SE "Sport" Version of the Contour, which featured exclusive wheels and the coveted 9-inch Sport Drum rear brakes. Rear disc brakes eventually became available in North America on certain Contour and Mystique models, although some customers bemoaned the reduced level of feel over the original sport drums.

The ST200 was then launched as the Enthusiast's car, with a tuned 2.5-litre V6 24v engine producing 202 bhp (151 kW). This engine made the ST200 go from standing to 60 mph (97 km/h) in around 7.7 seconds, and reach a maximum speed of 151 mph (243 km/h). Tuning included a different throttle body, cams, flywheel, and upper manifold, to name a few. This version of the Mondeo also had even harder sports suspension than the ST24, and came with half-leather Recaro sports bucket seats, full leather was available as a cost option. The ST200 was released to the public in Imperial Blue (All Countries due to receive the ST200) and additionally in Europe, Stardust Silver, Panther Black and Radiant Red. 66 were also made in Diamond White 73 (for use by various UK police forces). The North American counterpart to this model was known as the Contour SVT.

=== Africa ===
In South Africa, the trim levels offered were:

- LX – 1.8 L Zetec, midrange trim level, 4-door saloon
- CLX – 2.0 L Zetec, midrange trim level, 4-door saloon
- 2.0 Aspen – 2.0 L Zetec, luxury trim level version of the LX, 4-door saloon
- Si – 2.5 L V6, sports version, 5-door hatchback

=== South America ===
In Brazil, the trim levels offered were:

- CLX – 1.8 L Zetec, standard trim level, 4-door saloon, 5-door hatchback, and 5-door station wagon.
- GLX – 2.0 L Zetec, midrange trim level, 4-door saloon and 5-door hatchback, and 5-door station wagon.
- Ghia – 2.5 L V6 Duratec HE, Luxury&Sport trim level version, only was 4-door saloon.

== Ford Contour (1995–2000) ==
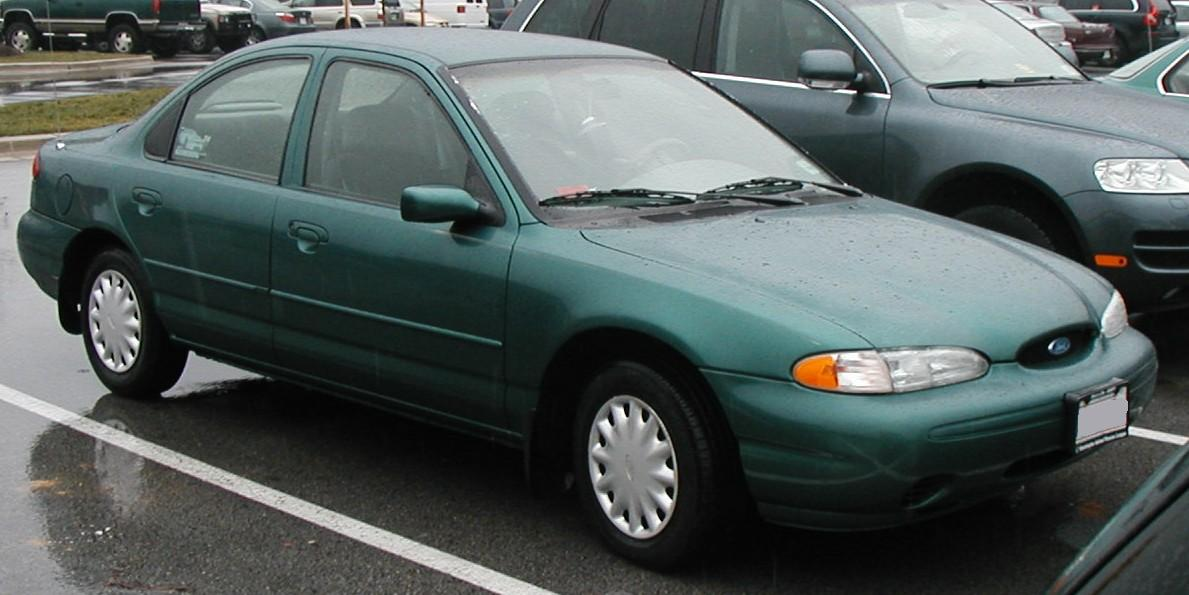
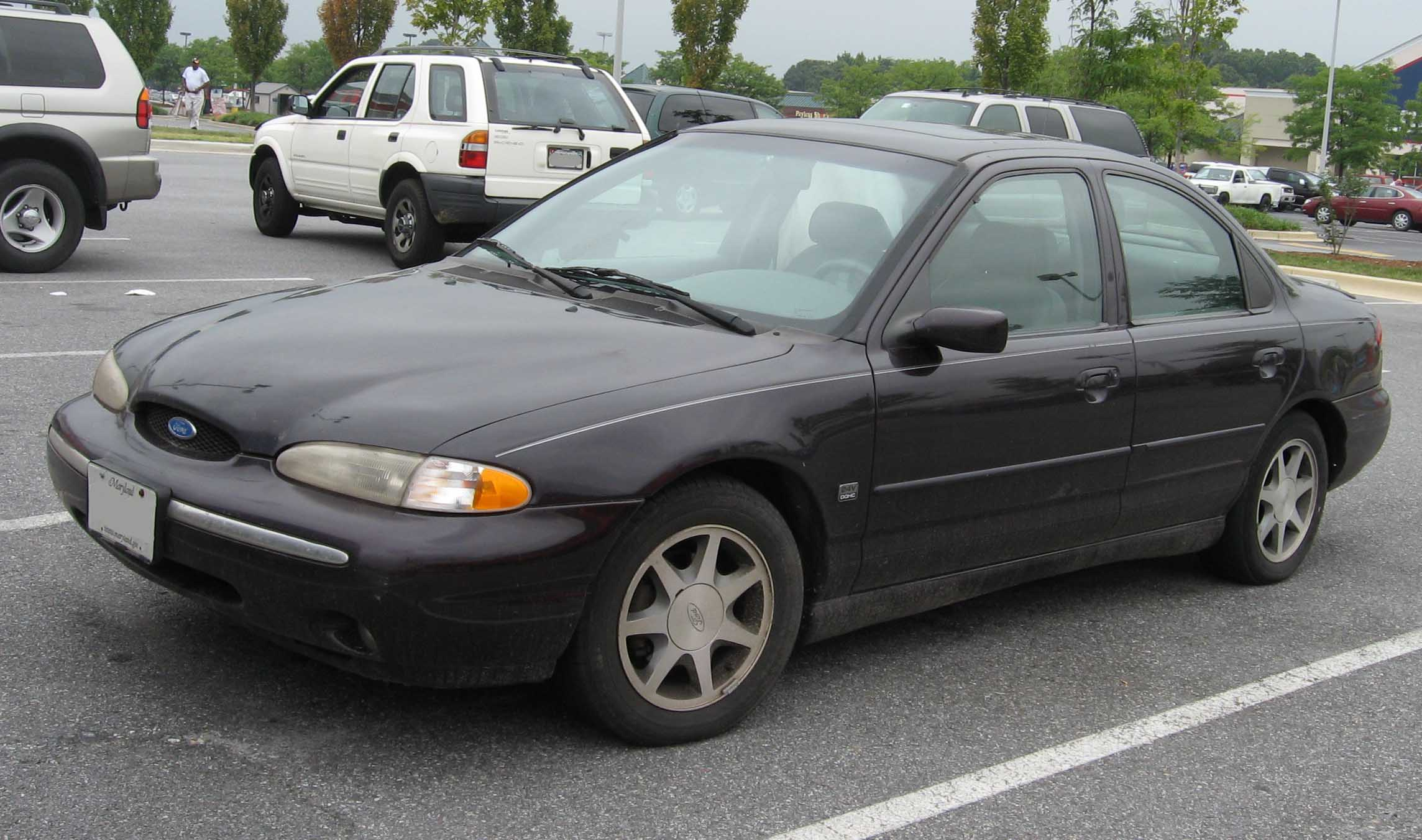
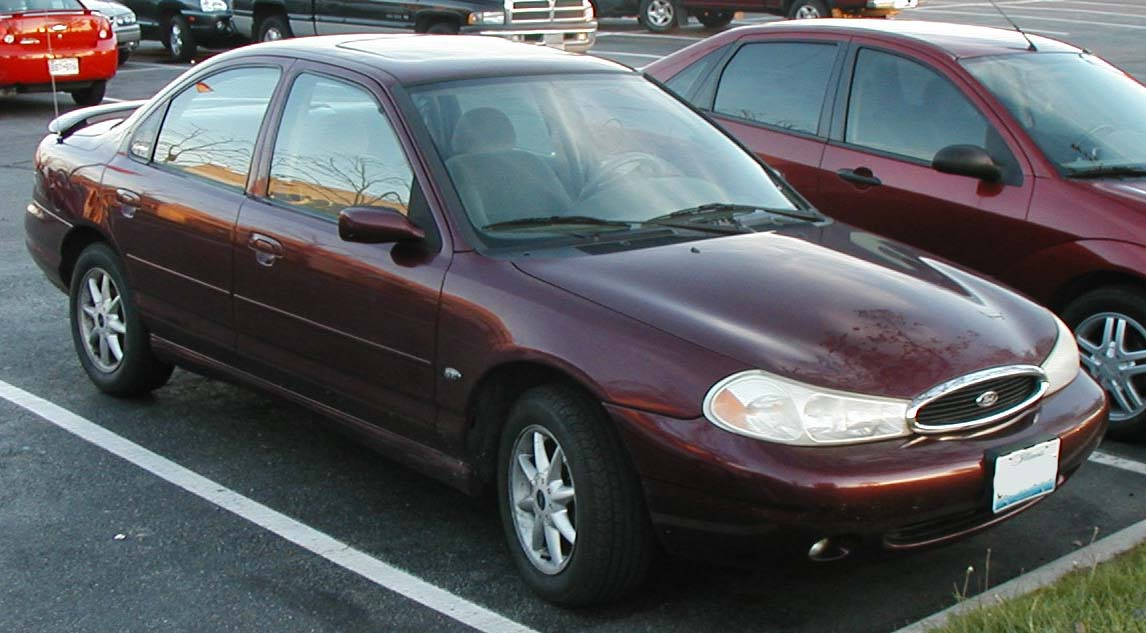
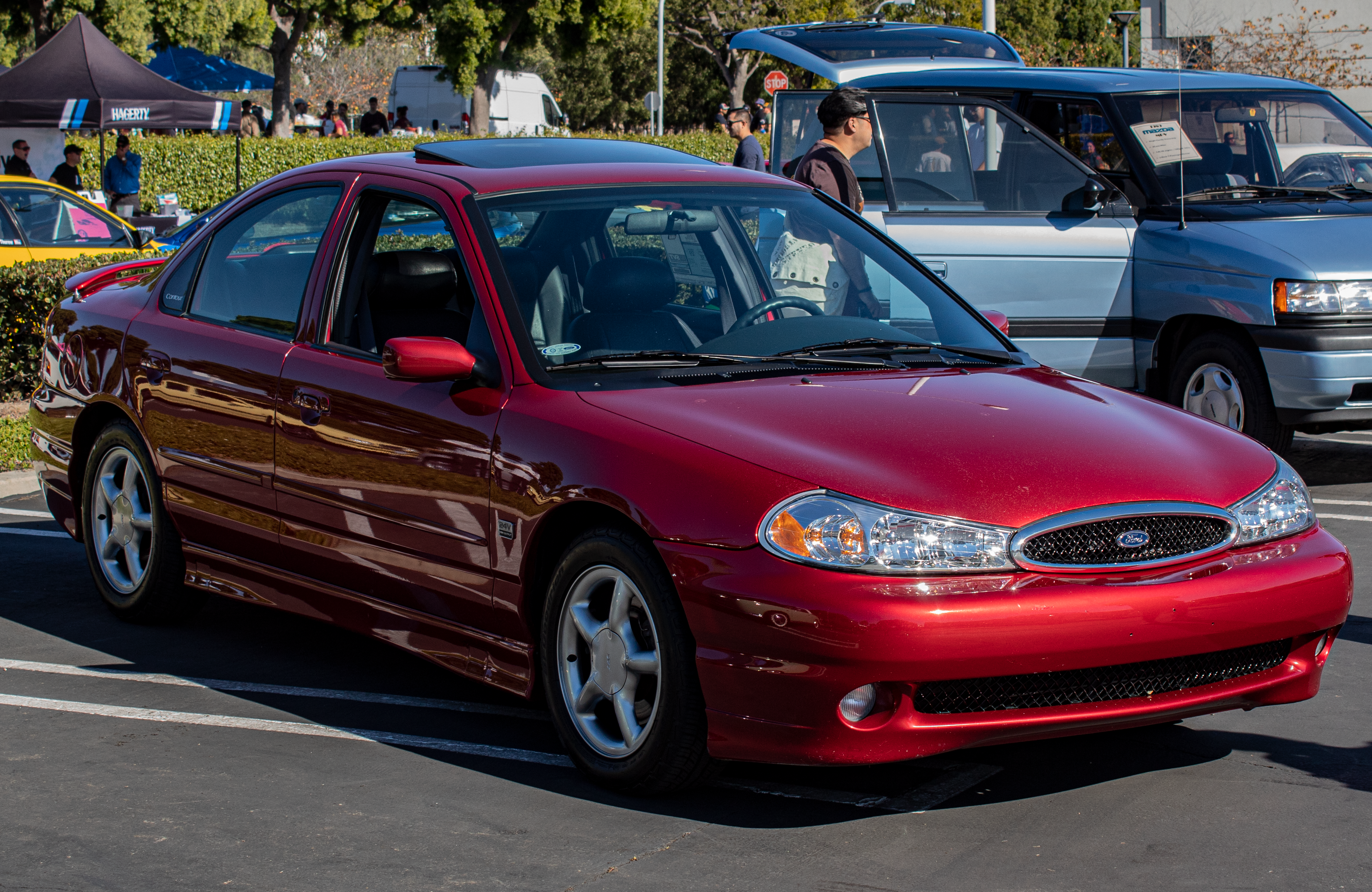
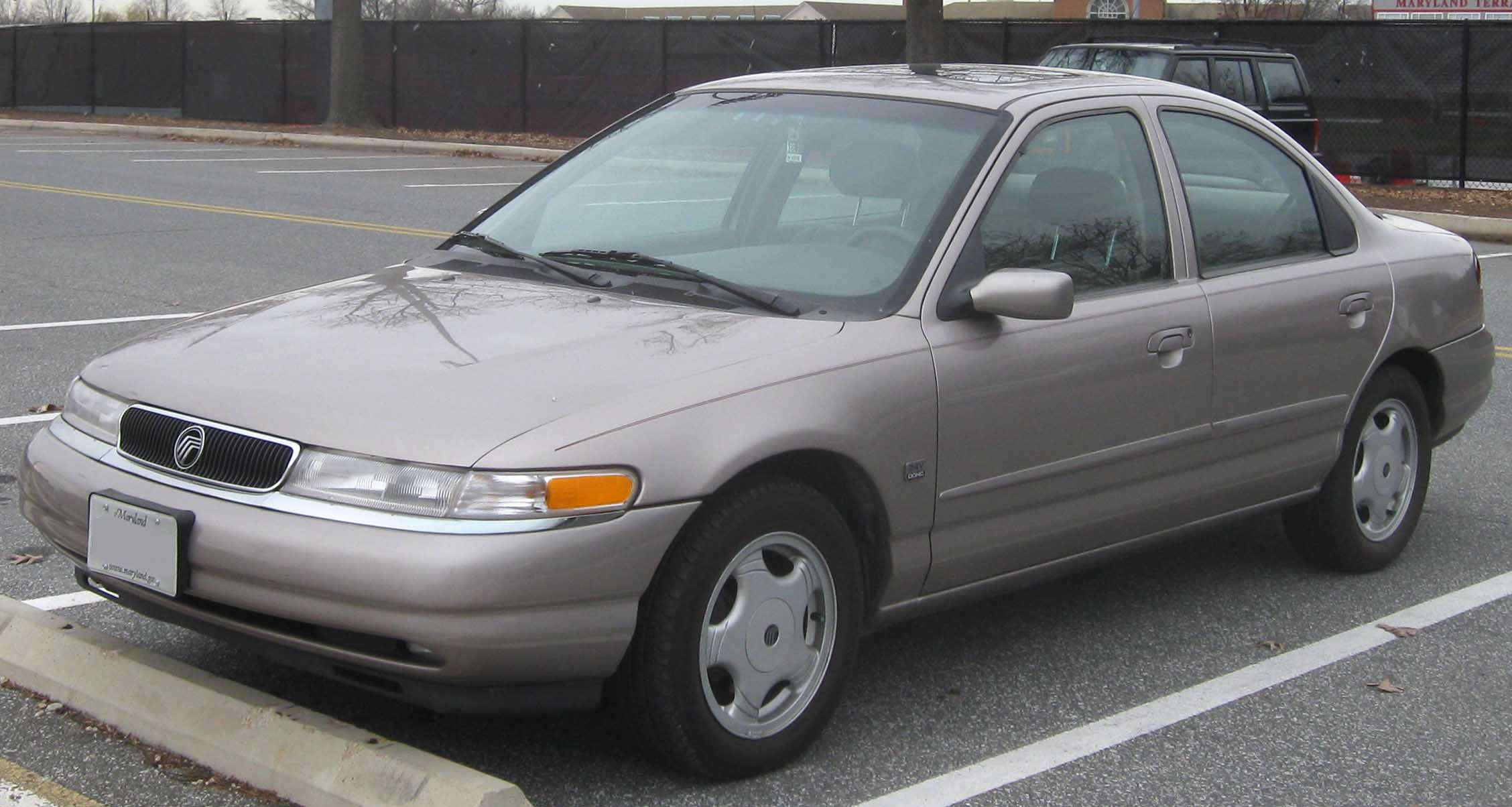
Top row: 1996 Ford Contour GL, 1996 Ford Contour SE, 1998 Ford Contour SE
Bottom row: 1998 Ford Contour SVT, 1995 Mercury Mystique LS, 1998 Mercury Mystique LS

From 1995 to 2000, Ford marketed the first-generation Mondeo in North America under the Ford Contour nameplate. Serving as the replacement for the Ford Tempo, the Contour was manufactured in the United States and Mexico. In contrast to the Mondeo (and its Tempo predecessor), the Contour was sold exclusively as a four-door sedan. In contrast with the Mondeo, the Contour was marketed as a compact car; along with being among the smallest cars in the midsize segment, doing so minimized the model overlap between the Contour and the larger Ford Taurus. For its production run, the Contour was marketed by Mercury as the Mercury Mystique (replacing the Mercury Topaz).

The Contour shared its trim nomenclature with the Taurus, including a standard-trim GL, higher-trim LX, and sporty SE trim; the Mercury Mystique used the GS/LS trims of the Sable and Grand Marquis.

Powered exclusively with gasoline-fuel engines, the Contour was sold with the 2.0 L Zetec I4 and the 2.5 L Duratec V6. For 1998, the model line was restyled with the front fascia of the Mondeo Mk II. The Ford Contour SVT was released for 1998, serving as the American counterpart of the Mondeo ST200.

Early in the 2000 model year, Mercury discontinued the Mystique, with the Contour ending production in October 2000. Neither model line was ever directly replaced, as Ford shifted to the Ford Focus as its compact car offering. For 1999, the CDW27 platform became the basis of the Mercury Cougar, which was exported from the United States as the Ford Cougar (replacing the Ford Probe worldwide). Outliving the Mondeo Mk II/Contour/Mystique by two years, the Cougar was discontinued after the 2002 model year.

== Sales ==
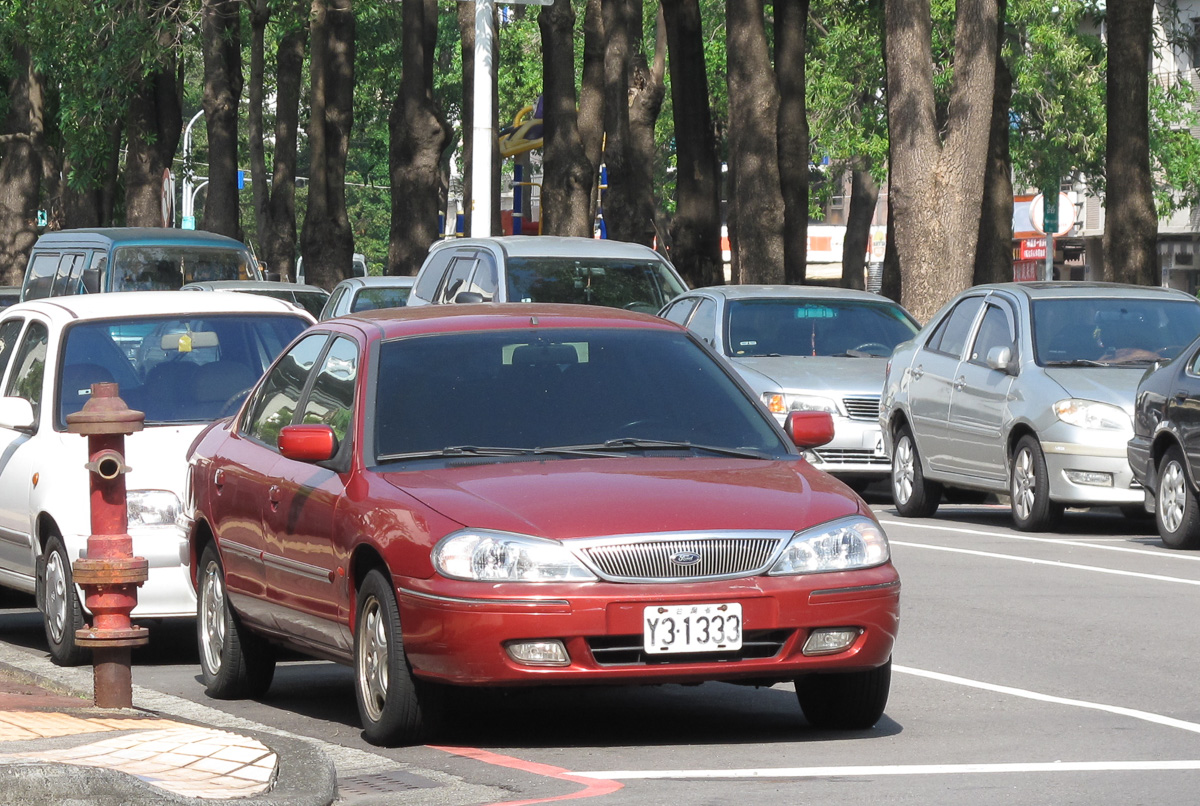
Ford Mondeo M2000, Taiwan

In Europe, the Mondeo was instantly declared a class leader. It was elected Car of the Year in 1994, ahead of PSA's new Xantia model. The facelifted Mondeo was initially popular, being Britain's third-best selling new car in 1996 through to 1998. However, in 1999 it dipped into sixth place and had been outsold by its biggest rival, the Vauxhall Vectra.

In North America and Australia, the Contour/Mondeo wasn't as successful. In the United States and Canada, the Contour suffered from market incompatibility with the preceding Ford Tempo, which by the end of its production run was an outdated design from the early 1980s which was sold primarily to lower-end customers and fleets on account of its low price. In contrast, the Contour was significantly more expensive as Ford hoped to sell it on its redeeming qualities; a base model 1995 Contour cost $13,310, which was over $2,000 more expensive than a base model 1994 Tempo, and several hundred dollars more expensive than a fully optioned 1994 Tempo LX, which priced it out of the market for returning Tempo customers.

Customers in the Contour's price range were instead drawn to the Taurus which was larger and offered better value for money, or to the Escort which was less expensive. Large factory incentives on the outgoing Taurus throughout 1995 in anticipation of a completely redesigned model due to launch later that year helped the Taurus cut into the Contour's initial market.

Anticipating this, Ford moved the Taurus upmarket with the release of the redesigned 1996 model, but poor customer reception to the new model's design and higher price forced Ford to heavily discount it and continuously reduce its base price through its life, reviving the in-showroom competition between the two models. Additionally, the Contour was hurt by strong competition in the medium segment by the other American automakers. The similarly priced Chrysler Cirrus, which was launched for the 1995 model year, matched the Contour in design, performance and driving dynamics, but had more features and a larger interior. The 1996 launch of the lower-priced Chevrolet Malibu also cut into Contour sales.

The Mondeo was released in Australia in 1995, but was not a sales success, where, similarly, a much larger local model, the Falcon, was available, and was dropped in 2000. Ford Australia withdrew completely from the medium-sized segment of the Australian market, arguing that it was in decline. The estate version, the first medium-sized Ford of its kind to be sold in Australia since the Cortina, was dropped in 1999. It struggled against Japanese midsized models such as the Honda Accord and Subaru Liberty, as well as the Holden Vectra, also imported from Europe, although unlike the Mondeo, briefly assembled locally. The Mondeo later returned to Australia in 2007 with an all-new model.

One theory was advanced by some motoring journalists; because the Mondeo was developed in Europe with limited input from Ford's North American and Australian operations, executives at both operations were unenthusiastic about the car and had no qualms about letting it fail in the marketplace to allow for the continued success of their locally developed models. Ford withdrew the Mondeo from both continents in 2000. The Mondeo returned to North America in 2012 as the redesigned 2013 Fusion as part of the "One Ford" business plan. The redesigned Mondeos, due to their larger size, better prices, increased development input from Australian and American operations, and changing market demographics, proved successful in both continents.

In Australia, the 1995 to 2000 Ford Mondeos were assessed in the Used Car Safety Ratings 2006 as providing "significantly better than average" protection for their occupants in the event of a crash.

The Mondeo launched in New Zealand to replace the Mazda 626-based Telstar following the closure of the Ford New Zealand assembly plant in 1997. Many earlier-model Mondeos, imported used from Japan, were also sold locally.

In 1997, the Mondeo was introduced into South Africa as a replacement for the Ford Telstar. It was produced locally at their Silverton plant in 1.8-litre and 2.0-litre saloon models. As production was limited to one body style, Estate (2.0-litre) Hatchback (2.5-litre V6) models were imported alongside the saloon models. The Mondeo was one of the first mainstream cars in South Africa to introduce airbags as standard equipment. Saloon sales were never a major success – fairly radical styling being cited as the main problem by a still conservative vehicle market. Styling was partly addressed by an Aspen model, which featured 15-inch alloy wheels, front fog lamps, and full leather trim.

In Taiwan, where it similarly replaced the Telstar, Ford Lio Ho produced a version of the Mondeo known as the Mondeo M2000, which had a front end similar to the outgoing Mercury Mystique, but with Ford badges. Its rear end was similar to that of the European models. This model was also exported to China.
