= David H. Price =

David H. Price may refer to:

- David Price (anthropologist) (born 1960), American anthropologist
- David H. Price (historian) (born 1957), American historian

== See also ==
- David Price (disambiguation)
