= John Oldfield (engineer) =

John Arthur Oldfield (13 January 1937 - September 2002) was a British engineer, and a former senior Ford executive and designer.

== Early life ==
He was born in Stepney. His family moved soon after to Essex, and he had 4 younger siblings. He was the son of George Oldfield and Alice Bunker, who married in Essex in 1935. He attended the Cranfield Institute of Technology (Cranfield University), gaining an MSc.

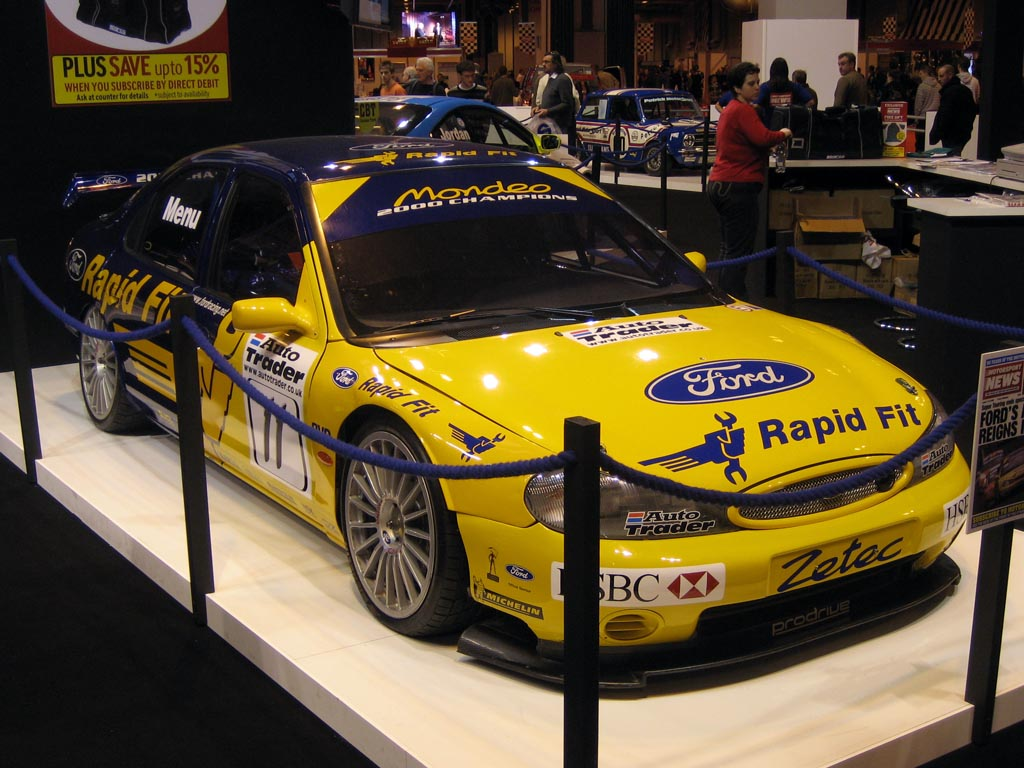
He was head of the entire Mondeo design programme until its launch in March 1993.

== Career ==
=== Ford ===
He joined Ford in 1958, at the age of 21. In 1970 he was the Ford chassis engineering manager at Dunton.

He became head of the £3bn design project for the Ford Mondeo (CDW27) in May 1986 from Ford Dunton, which was launched in March 1993 at the Geneva Motor Show. The car was made at Genk Body & Assembly in Genk, Belgium, which was to produce around 350,000 a year. At its peak, the Mondeo design team at the Dunton Technical Centre and Merkenich in Germany had 800 engineers. He was head of Mondeo design for six years up to its launch. The design for the Mondeo was agreed at the Merkenich Technical Centre in Cologne. American teams worked on the air conditioning and the automatic gearboxes, and European teams worked on the manual gearboxes. The Ford Zeta engine was developed for the Mondeo.

Ford at Dagenham had lost production of the Sierra in 1989 (moving to Genk), although it still made the Ford Fiesta (third generation) (its 7,000 workers were making around 240,000 a year in the early 1990s). The Sierra would sell 1.3m in the UK.

He became head of New Products at Ford of Europe in the early 1990s. Ford in the UK is headquartered at Warley, Essex, off the B186, south of Brentwood.

=== Aston Martin ===
In February 1994 he became Executive Chairman of Aston Martin in Newport Pagnell, then owned by Ford. Under his chairmanship, production of hand-crafted Aston Martins went from 150 a year to 700 a year. He oversaw the development of the Aston Martin DB7.

He retired on 22 October 1995, due to cancer, having worked for Ford for 37 years; he had been Executive Chairman for twenty months. Inside the automobile industry he was known as Mr Mondeo.

== Personal life ==
In his later years, he lived at Boreham, north-east of Chelmsford. He died in the City of Chelmsford district in 2002, due to motor neurone disease.

== See also ==
- Rose Mary Farenden, Project Manager in the mid-1990s of the Ford Focus
- Lindsey Halstead, former Ford of Europe chairman
- Ian McAllister, Managing Director of Ford UK from September 1991, later Chairman

Business positions
Preceded by Walter Hayes	Executive Chairman of Aston Martin; February 1994 - October 1995	Succeeded by David Price
