= David Price =

David Price may refer to:

== Military ==
- David Price (East India Company officer) (1762–1835), East India Company officer and orientalist
- David Price (Royal Navy officer) (1790–1854), British Rear Admiral at the Siege of Petropavlovsk

== Politics ==
- Sir David Price (British politician) (1924–2014), British Conservative Member of Parliament in the 1970s and 1980s
- David Price (Canadian politician) (born 1945), Member of Parliament from Quebec
- David Price (American politician) (born 1940), Democratic Congressman representing the 4th district of North Carolina
- David Edward Price (1826–1883), Canadian businessman and Senator
- David Price-White (1906–1978), British Member of Parliament

== Sports ==
- David Price (baseball) (born 1985), pitcher in Major League Baseball
- David Price (boxer) (born 1983), British Commonwealth heavyweight champion
- David Price (English cricketer) (born 1965), English cricketer
- David Price (South African cricketer) (1910–1942), South African cricketer
- David Price (footballer, born 1955), English footballer for Arsenal F.C.
- David Price Racing, British auto racing team founded by David Price

== Film and television ==
- David Price (actor) (born 1963), American film and television actor
- David Price (Australian actor), Australian actor in All Men Are Liars
- David Price (director) (born 1961), American director of Children of the Corn II: The Final Sacrifice and Son of Darkness: To Die For II

== Other ==
- David Price (anthropologist) (born 1960), American anthropologist
- David Price (surf lifesaver), Club Captain of Freshwater SLSC
- David Price (British academic) (born 1956), British earth scientist at University College London
- David H. Price (historian) (born 1957), American professor and author
- David Price (musician) (born 1969), British choral conductor and organist
- Dave Price (publisher) (born 1962), American journalist
- Dave Price (born 1966), reporter
- David Price (engineer) (born 1943), former Ford executive, programme manager of the Ford Mondeo, and a former Chairman of Aston Martin
- David Price (Welsh Independent minister) (1809–1878), Welsh Independent minister at Aberdare
