= Comuta =

Comuta may refer to:

- Ford Comuta
- Comuta-Car or Comuta-Van, variants on the Citicar

== See also ==
- Zygostates comuta, a species of orchid in the genus Zygostates
