= Rose Mary Farenden =

Northern Irish mechanical engineer

Rose Mary Farenden (born 22 May 1964) is a Northern Irish mechanical engineer who was the project manager for the launch of the Ford Focus in 1998.

== Early life ==
Rose Mary Farenden was born on 22 May 1964 in Belfast in Northern Ireland, where she attended an all-girls school. She gained a BSc degree in Mechanical Engineering from Queen's University Belfast (QUB) in 1985. At QUB she was the only female studying Mechanical Engineering.

== Career ==
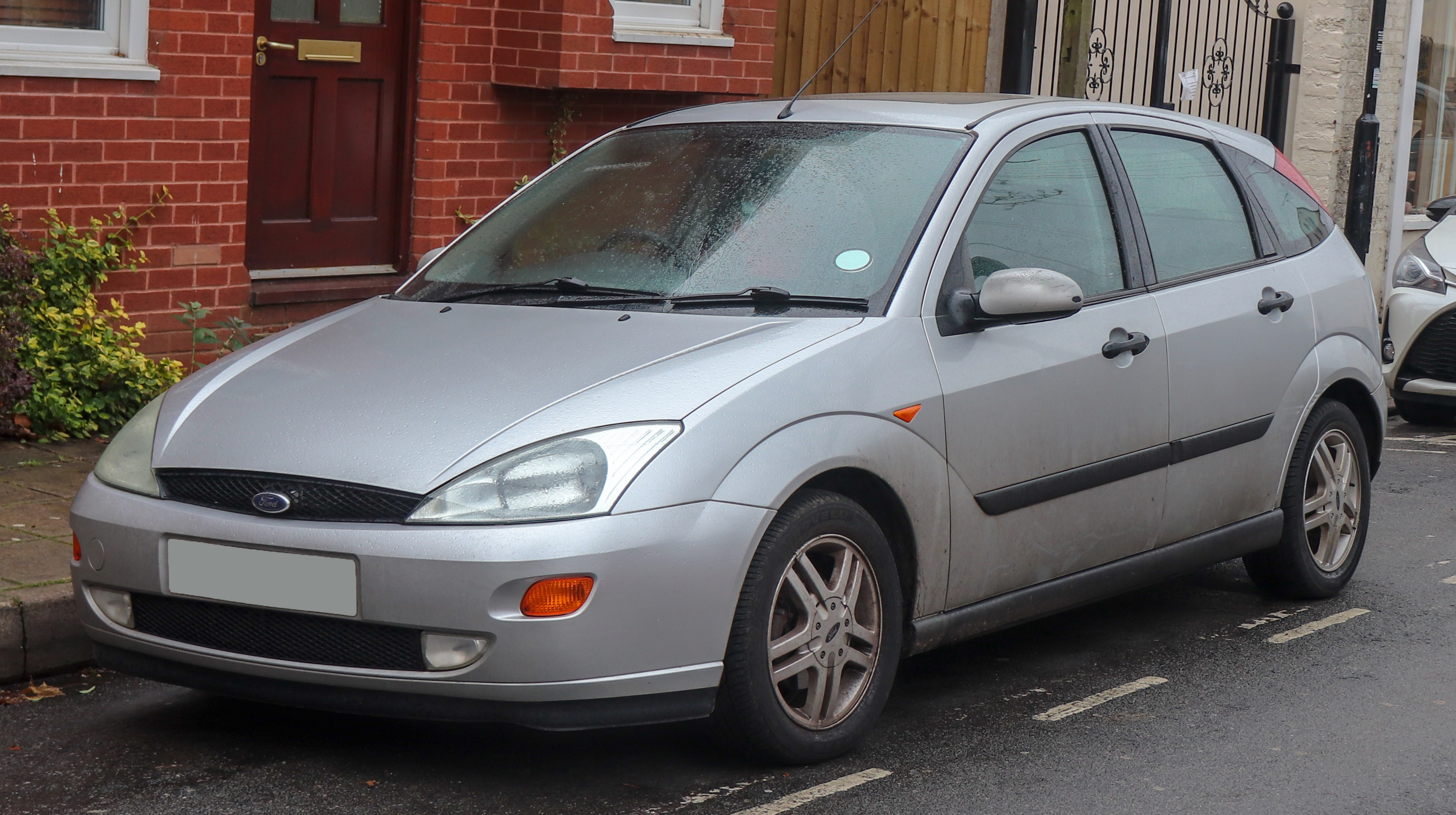
Her project management and design of the Ford Focus resulted in the launch of the vehicle in 1998

Farenden was employed at BP in 1985 as her first job. Three years later, after her departure from BP, she joined the Ford Motor Company in which she was employed as a CAD-CAM specialist. She was deployed at the Dunton Technical Centre (Small & Medium Vehicle Centre) in Essex. She also worked as a powertrain engineer at Dunton, then in 1999, she transferred to the United States to work for Ford. She became a Chartered Engineer with the Institution of Mechanical Engineers in May 1995. Later on, in 2002, she moved to Boeing, then to Rolls-Royce. As of present, she works as a director of Invest Northern Ireland and Catalyst Inc. Rose Mary is also CEO of 4CurFuture a not-for-profit live event based initiative to engage students aged 12-13 in a variety of career types.

== See also ==
- Chris Svensson, designer of the 1990s Ford Ka.
- John Oldfield (engineer), project manager of the Ford Mondeo in the early 1990s.
