= David Price (engineer) =

British engineer

David Lewis John Price (born March 1943) is a British engineer, and a former senior executive at Ford of Europe and Aston Martin.

== Early life ==
He was born in Ilford, Essex. His father was Welsh. He did not go to university.

== Career ==
=== Ford ===
He joined Ford in 1964. In the mid-1980s he was Director of Powertrain Programmes. He was the programme manager for the Ford Mondeo from 1988, replacing John Oldfield, to the early 1990s, of which the first model was launched in 1992. Lindsey Halstead was Chairman of Ford of Europe at the time. The final design model chosen for the Mondeo was design 5H, which was arrived at in May 1990 at the Dunton Technical Centre, and would be manufactured at Genk Body & Assembly from 23 November 1992, going on sale on 8 January 1993.

=== Aston Martin ===
Ford had bought 75% of Aston Martin in 1987, buying the remaining 25% in July 1994. He was Executive Chairman of Aston Martin from 30 October 1995 to 1997.

== Personal life ==
He is 6 ft 4in and follows London Welsh RFC. He is married and has two sons and a daughter; in 1971 he married Judith Gooden in Epping Forest District. He lived at Barnardiston in south Suffolk, north-east of Haverhill.

Business positions
Preceded by John Oldfield	Executive Chairman of Aston Martin; October 1995 - March 1997	Succeeded by Bob Dover
