= Rod Mansfield =

British engineer and business executive (born 1934)

John Roderick Ward Mansfield (born 29 May 1934) is a British engineer and business executive, influencing British motorsport, and ultimately many British boy racers.

== Early life ==
Mansfield belonged to the 750 Motor Club.

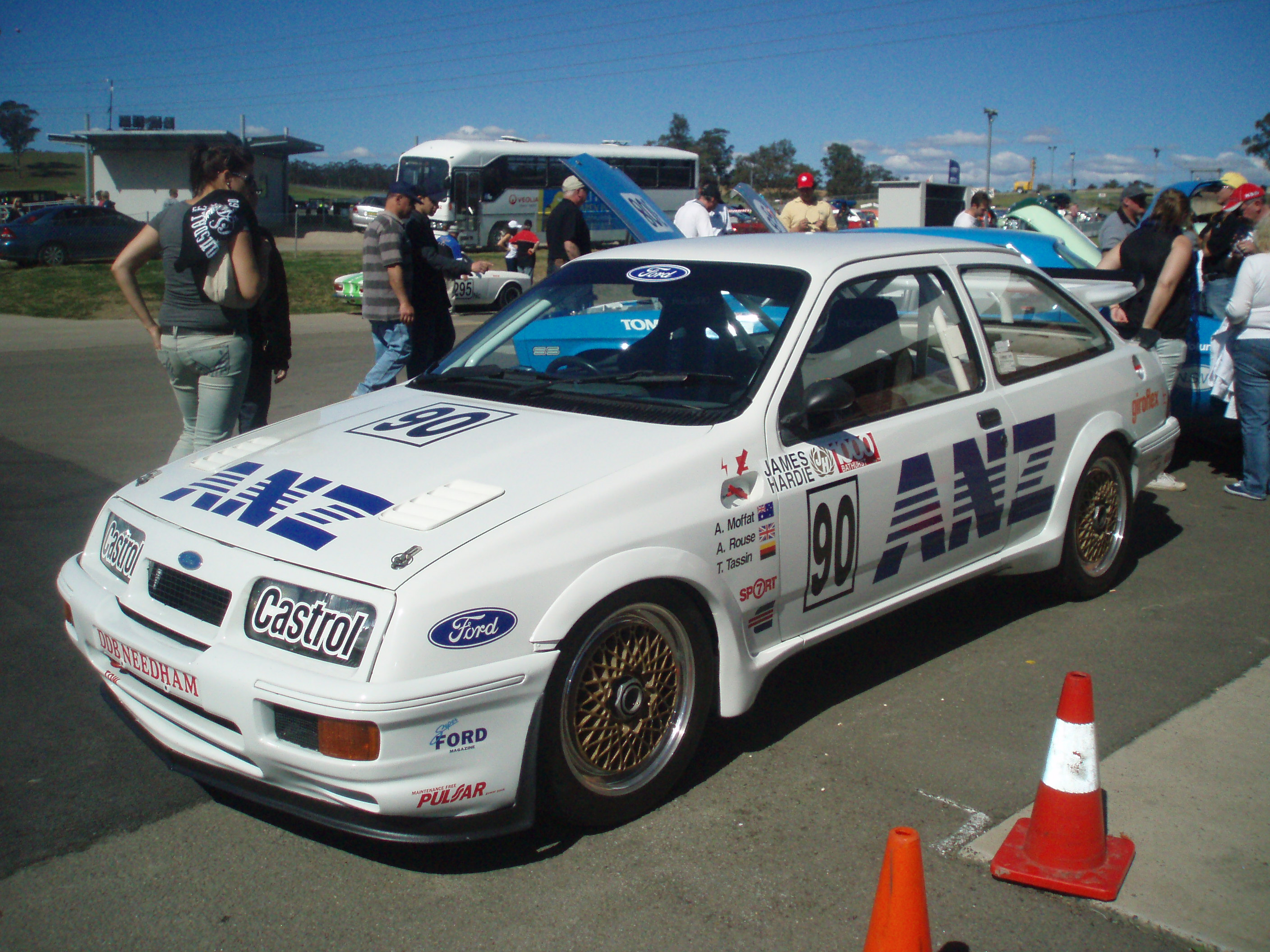
A 1987 Ford RS 500 in August 2010

== Career ==
=== Ford ===
He created the Special Vehicle Engineering (SVE) department at the Dunton Technical Centre in Essex in 1980, and ran it until 1990. It produced the more-powerful roadworthy versions of the Ford Sierra.

Dieter Hahne took over the department in January 1991; he had been manager of the Medium Cars programme for Ford.

=== Lotus ===
Mansfield became Managing Director of Lotus Cars on 14 August 1995, when Lotus was owned by Bugatti, who had bought the company from General Motors in 1993. He left Lotus in February 1996. Group Lotus employed around 900 people at its Norfolk factory.

== Personal life ==
Mansfield lives in Little Burstead in Essex. He married Valerie Jones in 1958 in Surrey.

Business positions
Preceded by	Managing Director of Lotus Cars; August 1995 - February 1996	Succeeded by
