= Ford Comuta =

Overview
- Manufacturer: Ford
- Production: Prototype only
- Model years: 1967
- Assembly: Dunton Technical Centre

Body and chassis
- Class: Microcar
- Body style: 2-door city car

Dimensions
- Kerb weight: 550 kg

The Ford Comuta was an experimental electric vehicle designed by Ford in 1967 at the Dunton Technical Centre. The vehicle was powered by four 12-volt 85-Ah lead batteries.

When fully charged, the car had a range of 60 kilometres (37 mi) at a speed of 40 kilometres per hour (25 mph), and was capable of a maximum speed of 60 kilometres per hour (37 mph). Only a limited number of Comutas were produced.
