= Ford Focus =

Compact/small family car manufactured by the Ford Motor Company 1998–2025

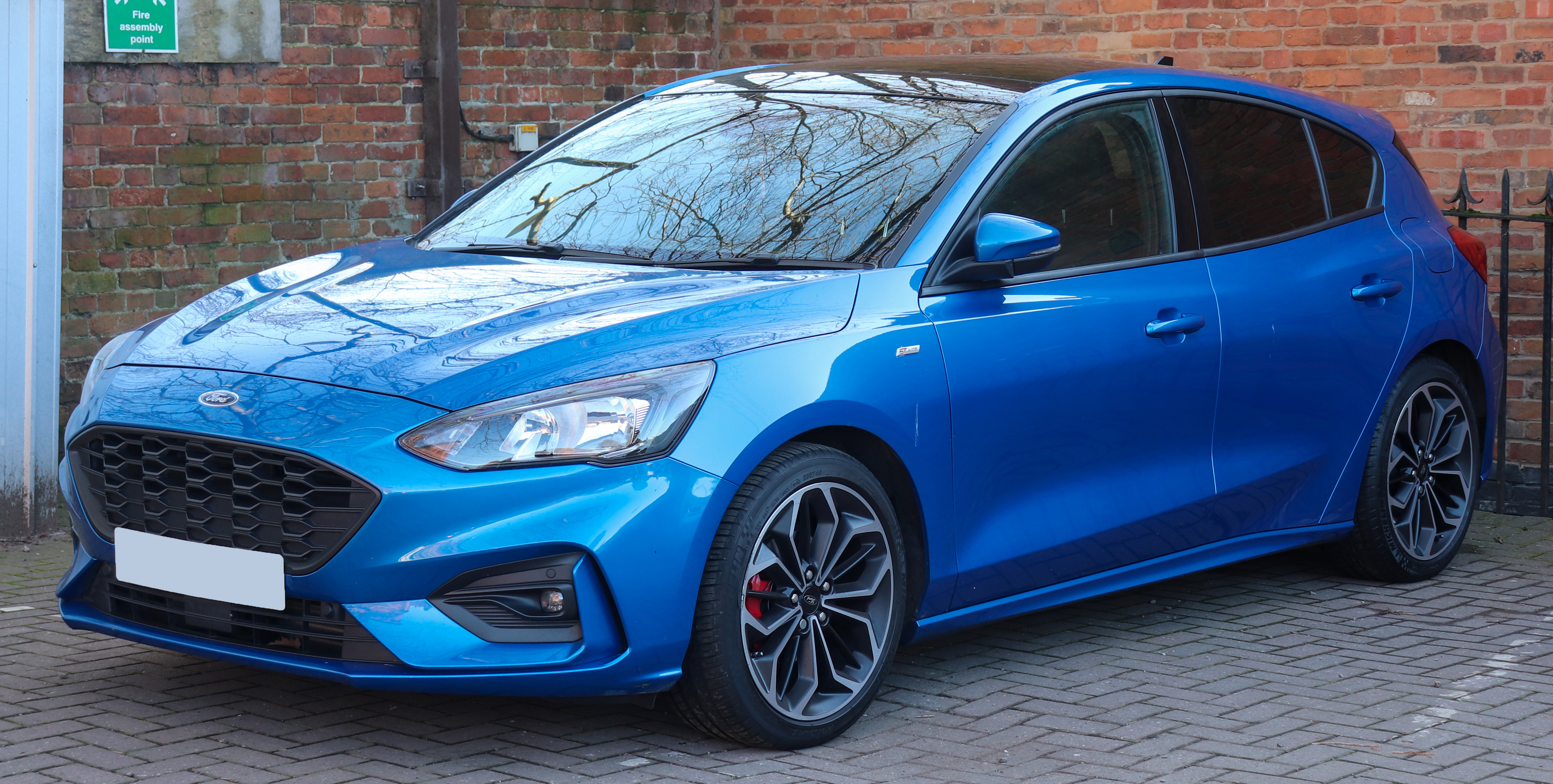
- 2018 Ford Focus ST-Line X

Overview
- Manufacturer: Ford
- Production: 1998–2025
- Model years: 2000–2018 (North America)

Body and chassis
- Class: Small family car/Compact car (C)
- Body style: 3/5-door hatchback; 4-door sedan/saloon; 5-door estate; 2-door coupe (US); 2-door coupé-cabriolet (Europe)
- Layout: Front-engine, front-wheel drive Front-engine, four-wheel-drive (Mk 3 RS Only)

Chronology
- Predecessor: Ford Escort (Europe, North America and Argentina); Ford Laser (Asia and Oceania)
- Successor: Ford Kuga (indirect)

The Ford Focus is a compact car (small family car, or C-segment in Europe) manufactured by Ford from 1998 until 2025. It was created under Alexander Trotman's Ford 2000 plan, which aimed to globalize model development and sell one compact vehicle worldwide. The original Focus was primarily designed by Ford of Europe's German and British teams. Production of the fourth generation Focus began in 2018 in Germany and China. In 2025, Ford announced that the Focus would no longer be built, in line with an announcement made in 2022.

== Naming ==
The decision to name the new car the "Focus" was made in early 1998, as Ford's senior management had been planning to keep the "Escort" nameplate for its new generation of small family cars. A last-minute problem arose in July 1998 when a Cologne court, responding to a case brought by the publisher Burda, ordered Ford to avoid the name "Focus" for the cars in the German market since the name was already taken by one of its magazines. This eleventh-hour dispute was resolved, however, and the car was launched with the name "Focus".

== First generation (C170; 1998) ==
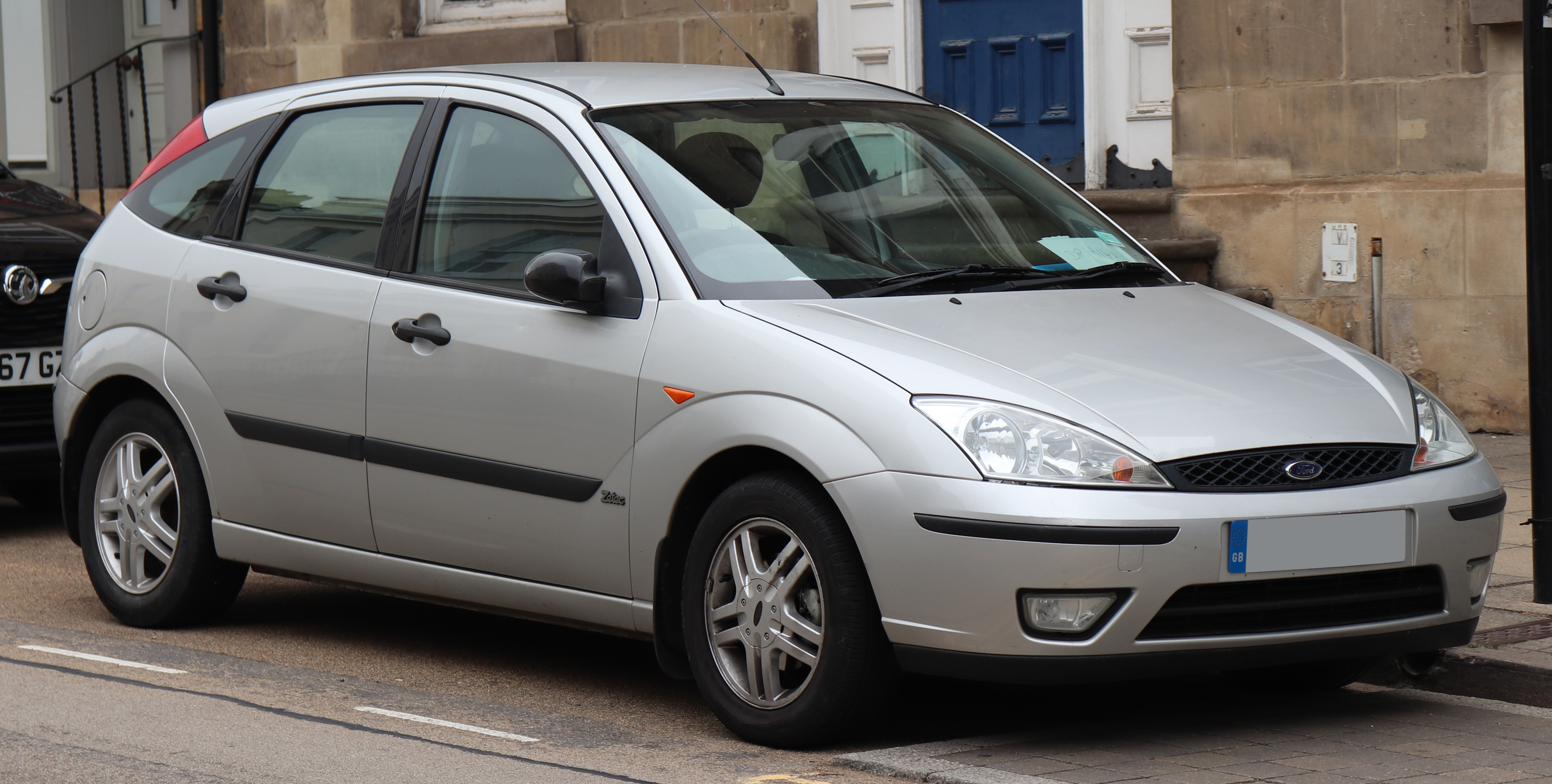

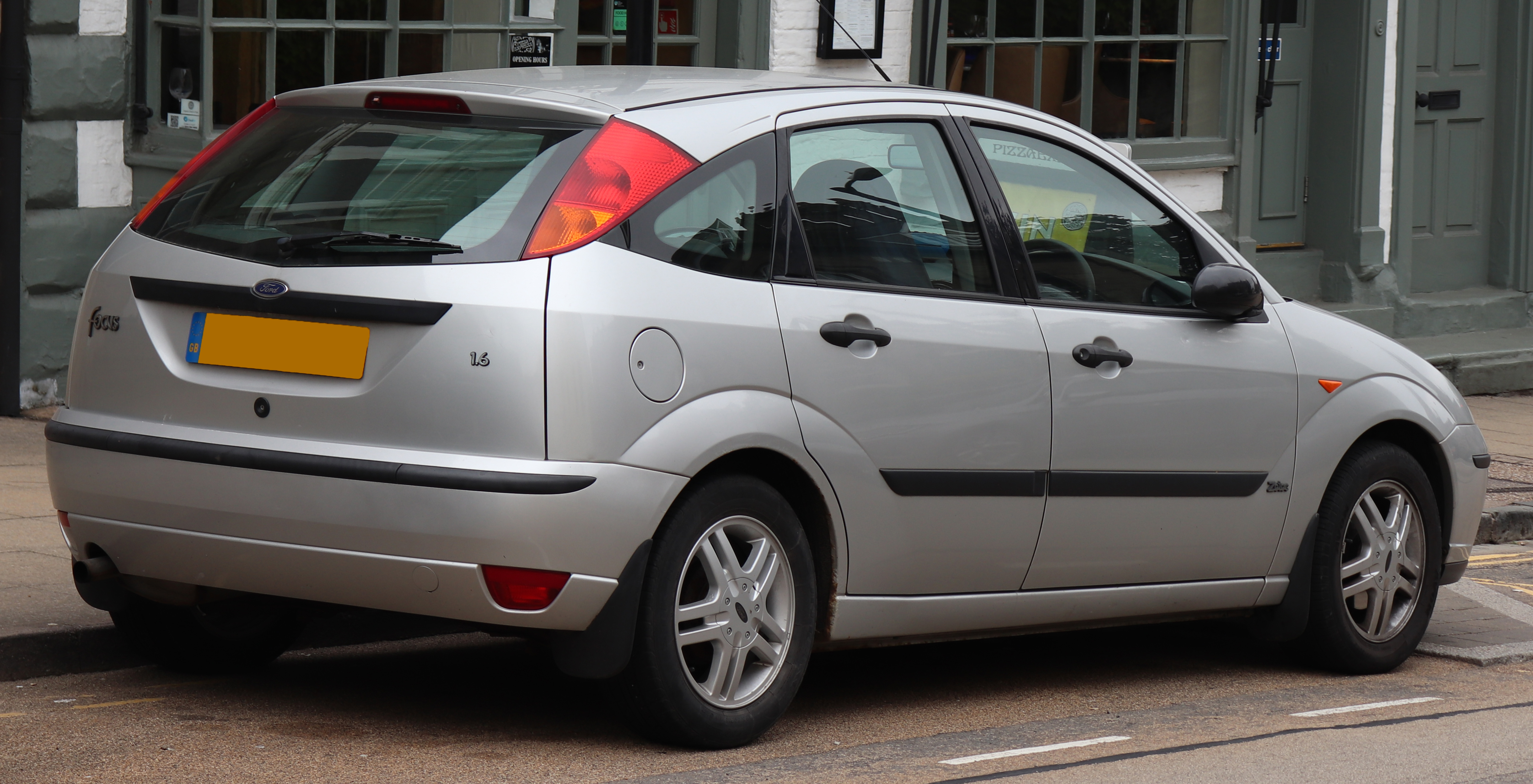
Ford Focus hatchback (first generation facelift)

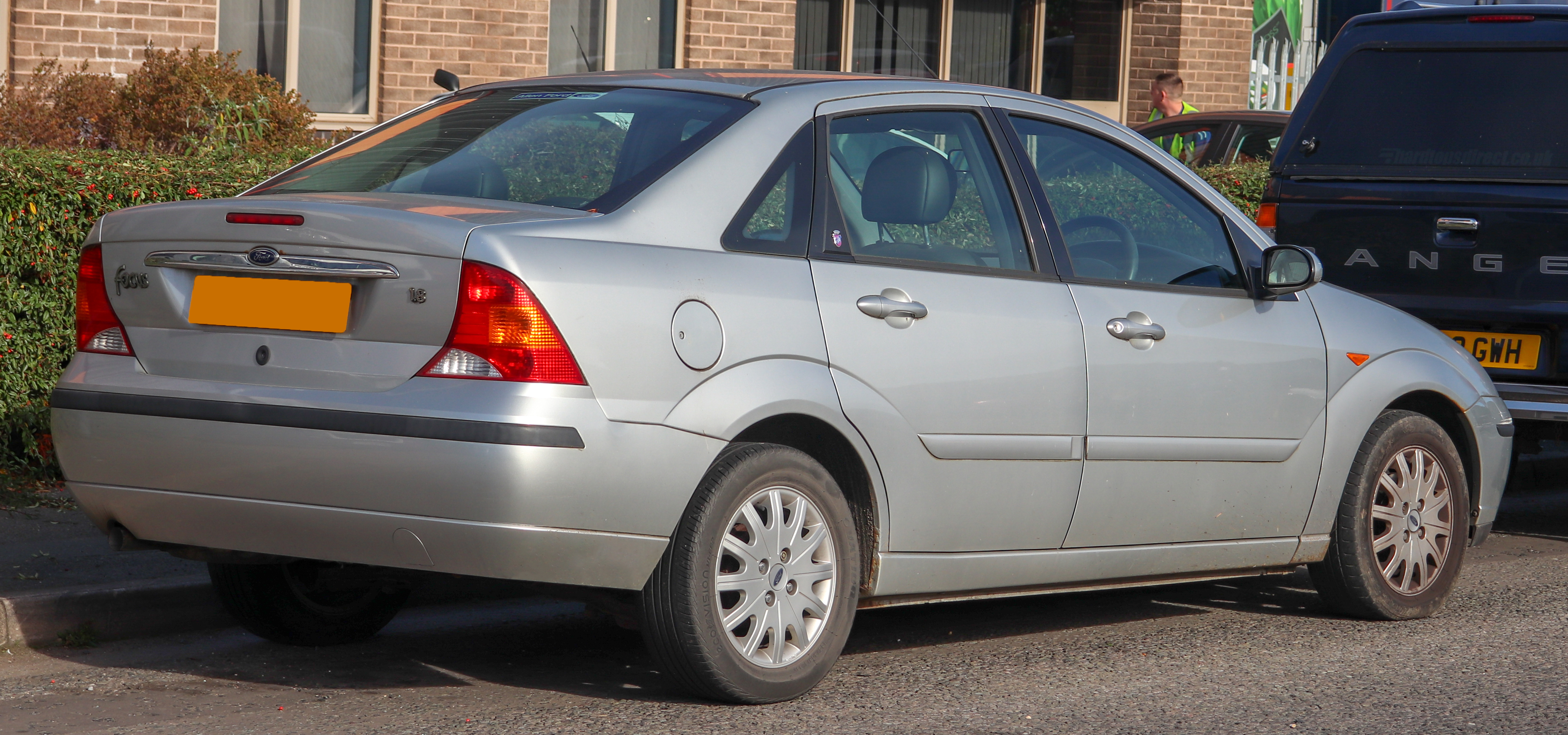
Ford Focus Saloon (first generation)

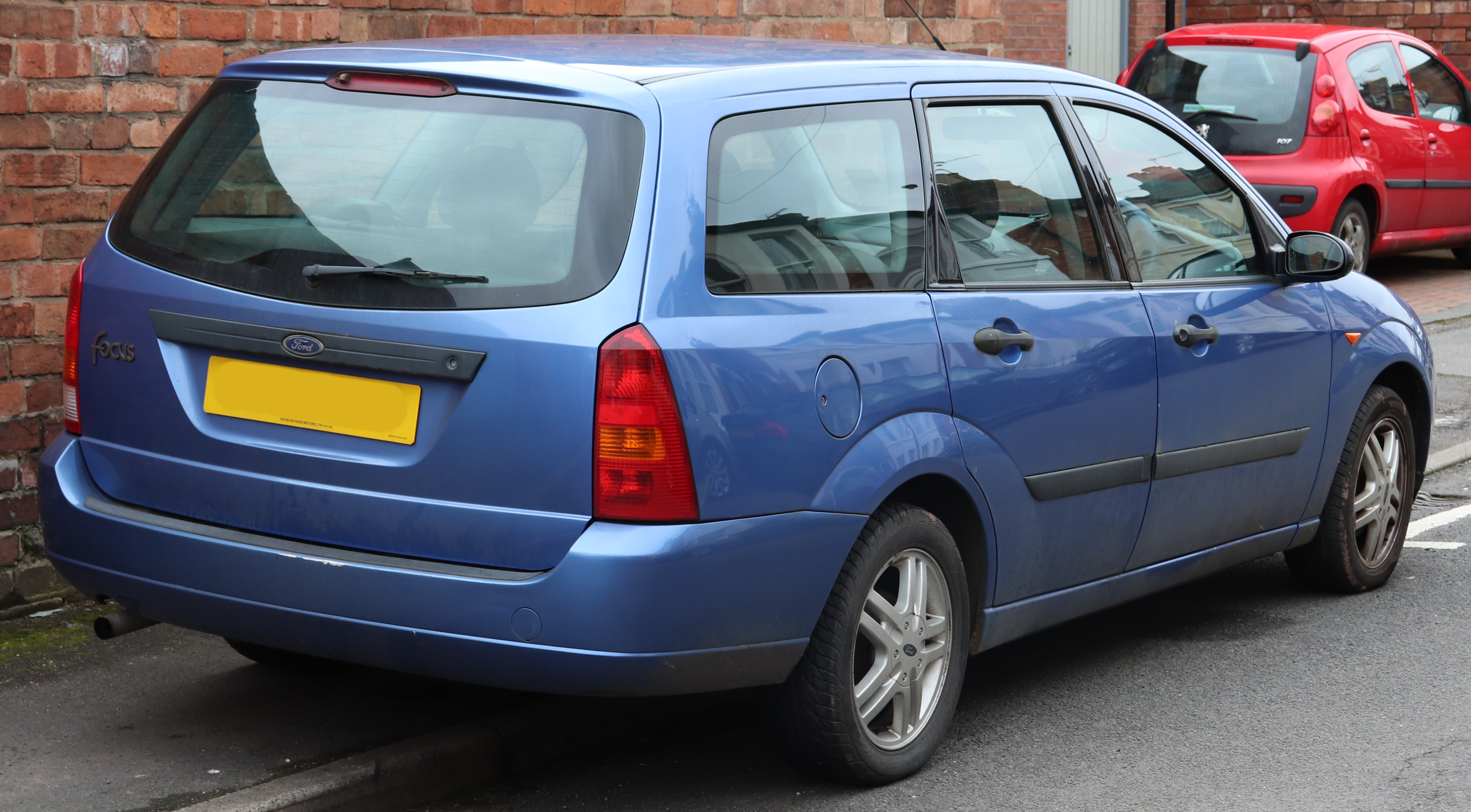
Ford Focus Estate (first generation)

Ford of Europe introduced the Focus in 1998 to the European market as a replacement for the Ford Escort. The Focus Mk 1 was awarded the 1999 European Car of the Year award. The project manager for the Ford Focus at Dunton was Rose Mary Farenden.

Ford of North America began marketing the Focus in September 1999 for the 2000 model year, with some changes from the European version. The car was launched as a three-door hatchback, four-door sedan, and five-door wagon; a five-door hatchback debuted in 2001.

In 2002, Ford launched its highest performance version of the Focus, called the Focus RS. It came with a 2.0-litre turbocharged Duratec RS engine, a Quaife ATB limited-slip differential, an AP Racing clutch, and a revolutionary design front suspension strut system called "Revo-knuckle"- as marketed by Ford, Sachs Racing dampers, Brembo brakes, 18" O.Z Racing alloy wheels, Michelin Pilot Sport tyres and a host of other performance changes, combined with a much more aggressive appearance, and was available only in Ford's Imperial blue. Tickford Engineering won the engineering contract for the research, development and to oversee production of the Mk 1 Focus RS. Tickford made substantial modifications to the base unit, with up to 70% of the base components either updated, re-engineered or completely redesigned. Despite the development being carried out in the United Kingdom, Ford produced the Focus RS in the Saarlouis plant in Germany between 2002 and 2003 making a limited run of 4501 cars only. This original Focus RS was only available in Europe; just under half (2147) of these were sold in the UK.

For decades, in the U.S., small cars like the Focus were seen as a tool to draw in younger buyers looking for a cheap basic transportation and to increase auto makers' fleet average fuel economies to meet U.S. federal standards. Ford was said not to be concerned about losing money on the Focus so the company could sell gas guzzlers for big profits. However, recent sales of new Focuses have been able to maintain lower or overall discounting incentive rates than many competing vehicles in its class. Many industry insiders view cars like the Focus as 'compliance cars' because of their role in helping to bring up the corporate fleet average fuel economy to meet current fuel-economy standards.

== Second generation (C307/C170; 2004) ==
=== Europe (C307; 2004) ===
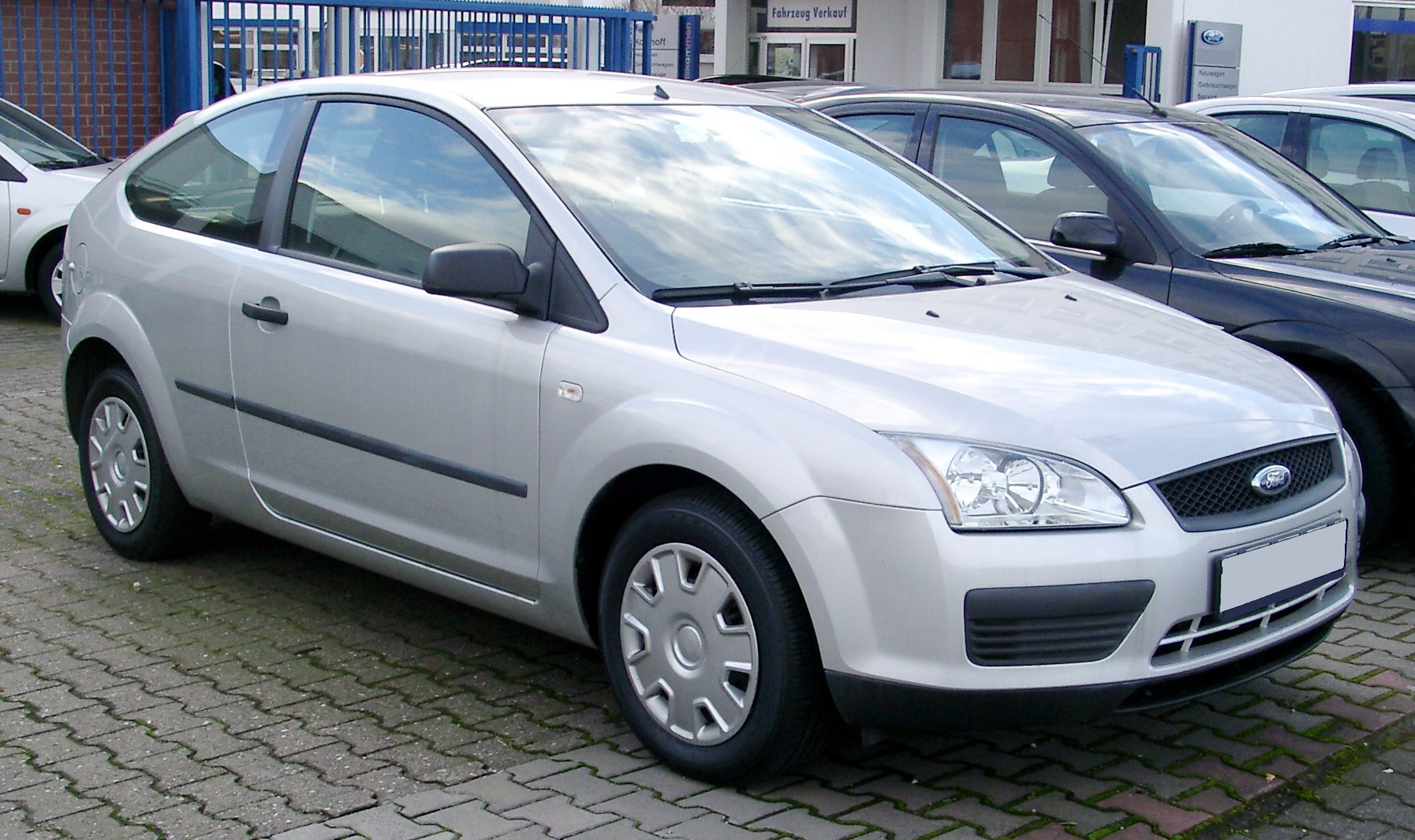
Ford Focus hatchback (second generation pre-facelift)

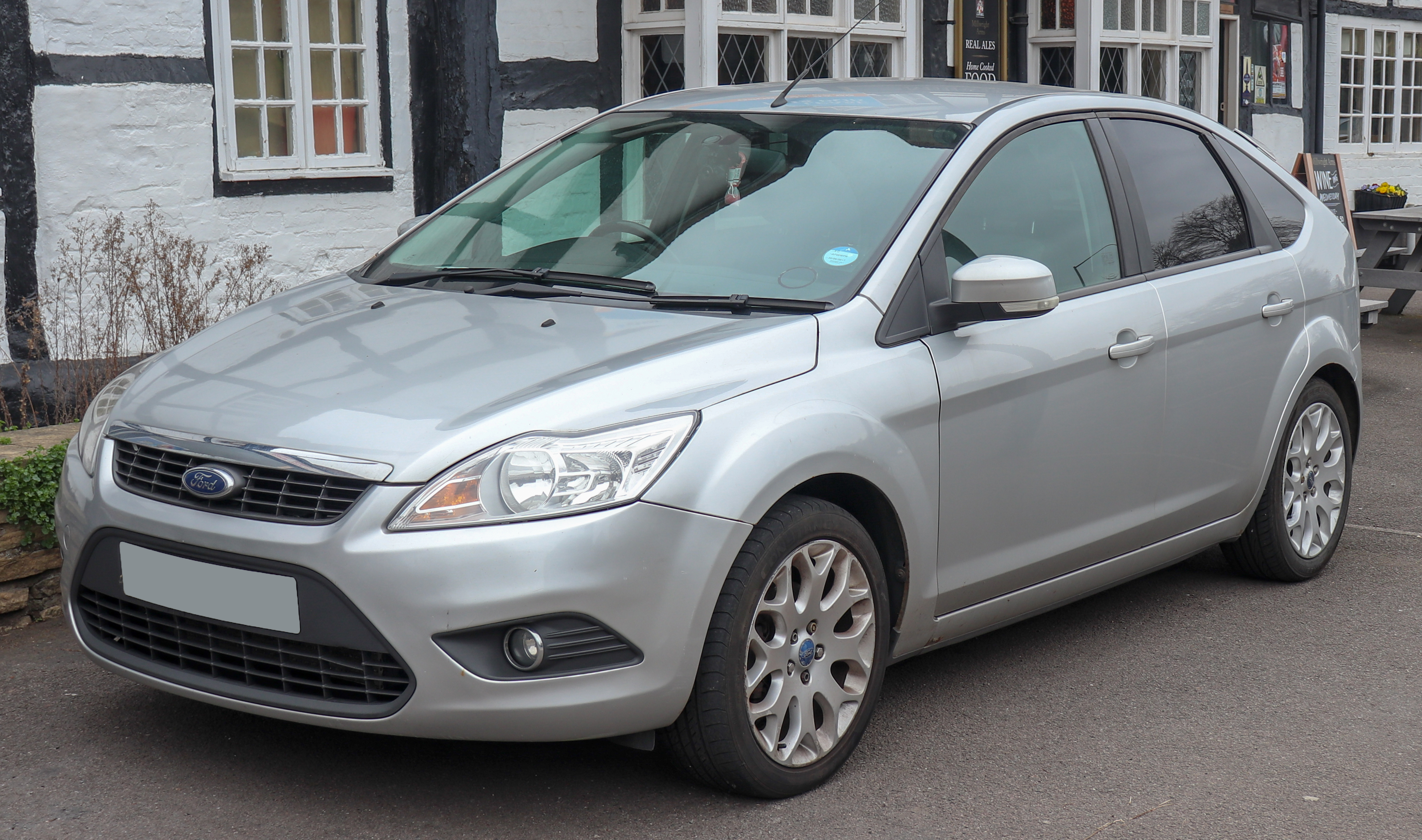

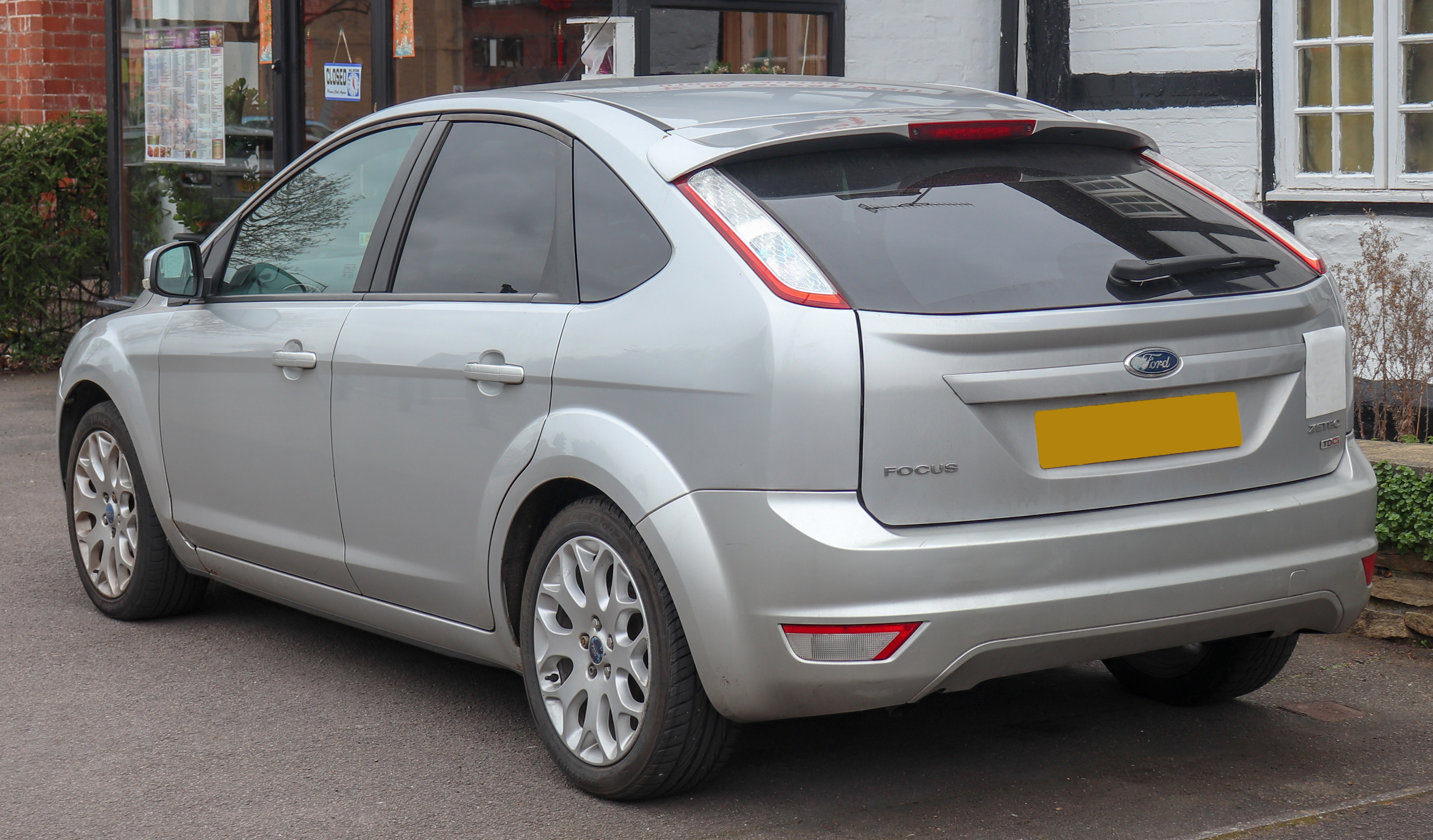
Ford Focus hatchback (second generation facelift)

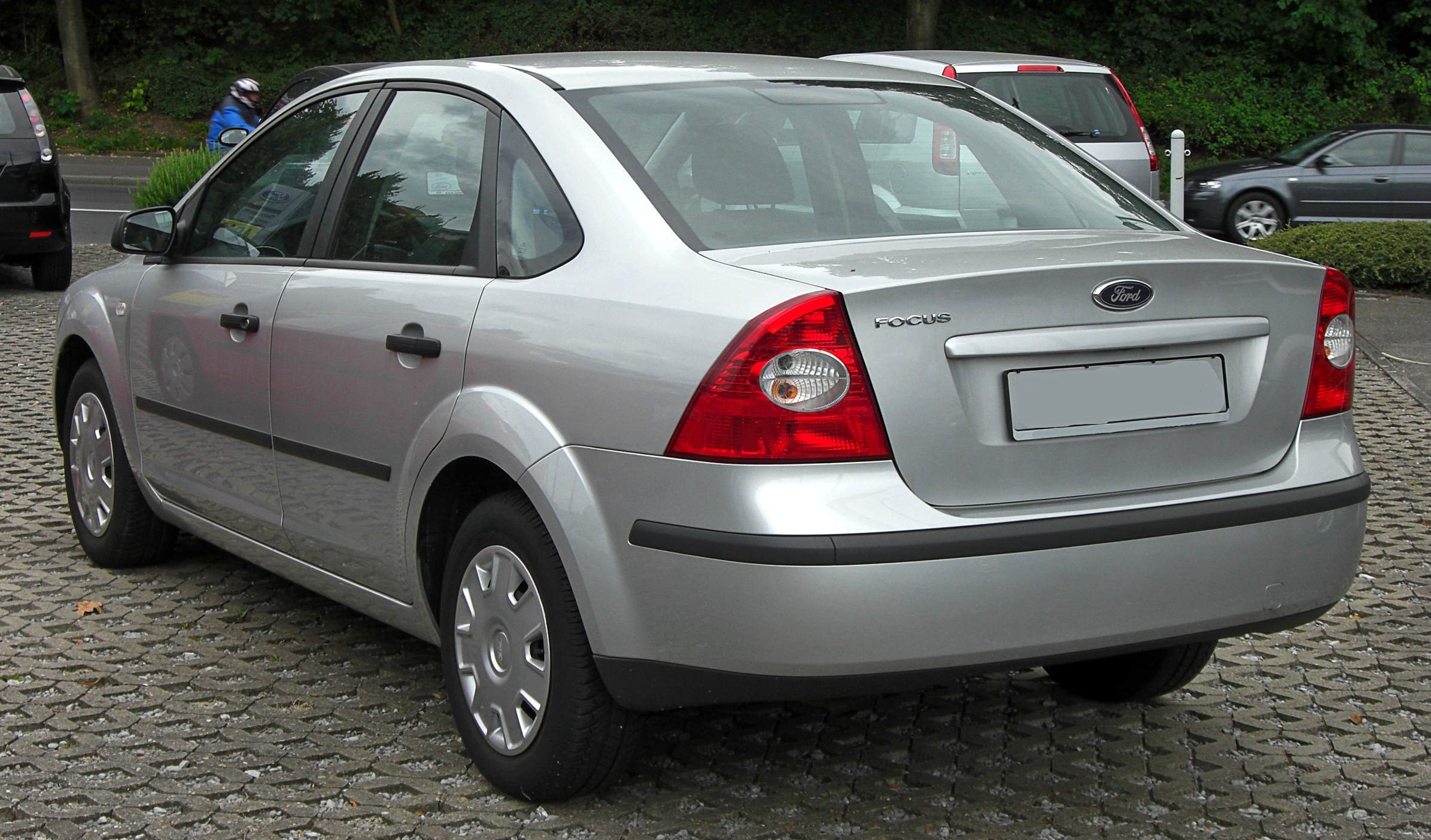
Ford Focus Sedan (second generation)

The second generation Focus was launched at the Paris Motor Show on September 25, 2004, as a three and five-door hatchback and an estate, although the new car was previewed, in 4-door sedan form, as the "Focus Concept" developed by Ford Europe at the Beijing Motor Show in mid-2004.

The basic suspension design, which contributed much to the Mk 1's success, was carried over largely unchanged from its predecessor. Along with a 10 percent stiffer bodyshell, according to Ford this offers a better ride, but critics claimed the car lacked the precise and poised handling of the Mk 1. The same body styles as the Mk 1 Focus were offered, though the sedan did not appear until mid-2005. A two-door coupé-cabriolet with a retractable hardtop was added to the line-up in 2007.

The Focus Mk 2 is larger and considerably heavier than its predecessor: it has a 25 mm (0.98 in) increase in wheelbase, and is 168 mm (6.6 in) longer, 8 mm (0.31 in) taller, and 138 mm (5.4 in) wider. As a result, the interior and boot space have increased. New technologies include a KeyFree system, a solar-reflect windshield, adaptive front lighting, Bluetooth hands-free phones and voice control for audio, telephone, and climate control systems.

Stylistically, the Mk 2 features the same design language found in the Mondeo and Fiesta. Although still recognisable as a Focus, the new car uses styling features from the abandoned B-Proposal for the original Focus which never reached production.

In 2005, Ford released a MK.II version of Ford's sports division of Focus, the Focus ST. This one produced 225 bhp (168 kW) and could achieve a 0–60 mph (0–97 km/h) time of 6.4 seconds, and a 152 mph (245 km/h) top speed, using a 2.5-litre, five-cylinder turbocharged engine originating from Volvo.

2007–2008 saw a minor facelifted version introduced, featuring Ford's Kinetic Design philosophy. Major changes included a new bonnet with more creases, the removal of all mouldings along the doors and sides, new sculpted pull back headlights, and the big trapezoidal lower grille.

In 2009, the new Focus RS was launched, with a modified version of the 2.5-litre engine found in the ST.

=== North America (C170; 2007) ===
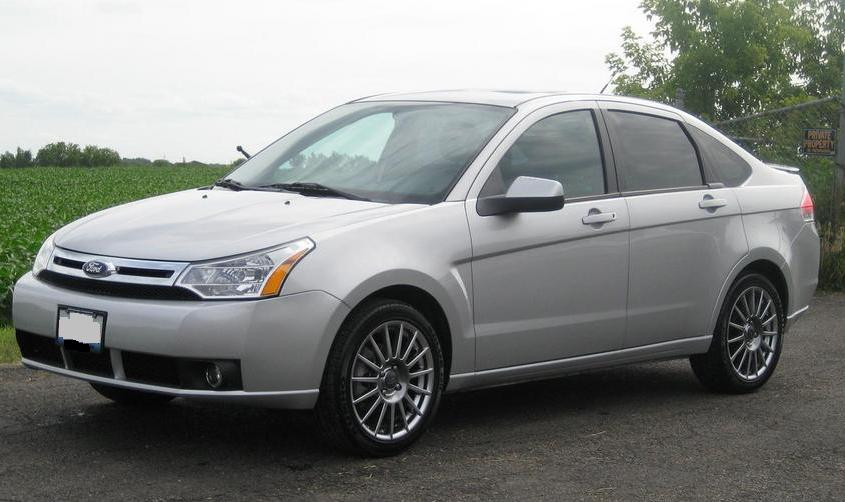
Ford Focus (North America second generation)

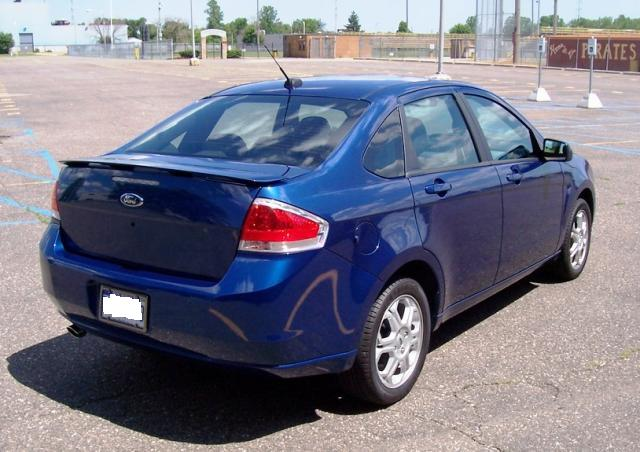
Ford Focus (North America second generation)

For the North American market, development followed a separate path. Since debuting at the 2007 North American International Auto Show, the restyled 2008–2011 generation was available as a two-door coupe and four-door sedan; the hatchbacks and wagon were discontinued. The interior was redesigned, including new seats, a new dashboard design with message center on top of the dashboard, ambient lighting, dashboard panels that simulate brushed aluminum, and Ford's voice-controlled Sync audio/Bluetooth system. Also included in the redesign was a support beam behind the dashboard for extra structural rigidity.

Though informally considered as the second generation, it was never officially referred to as such by Ford since its platform was the same as the first generation.

== Third generation (C346; 2010) ==
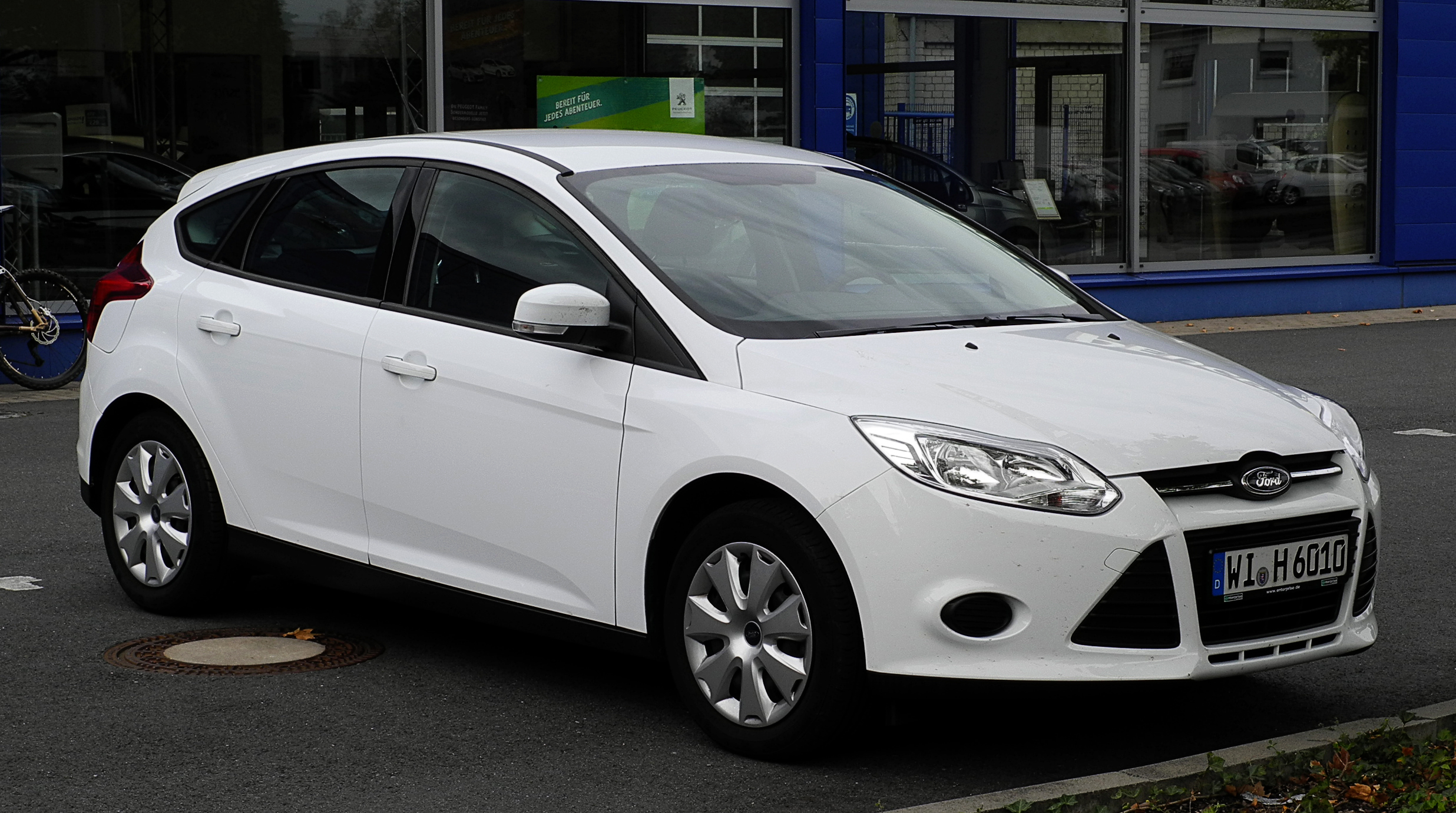

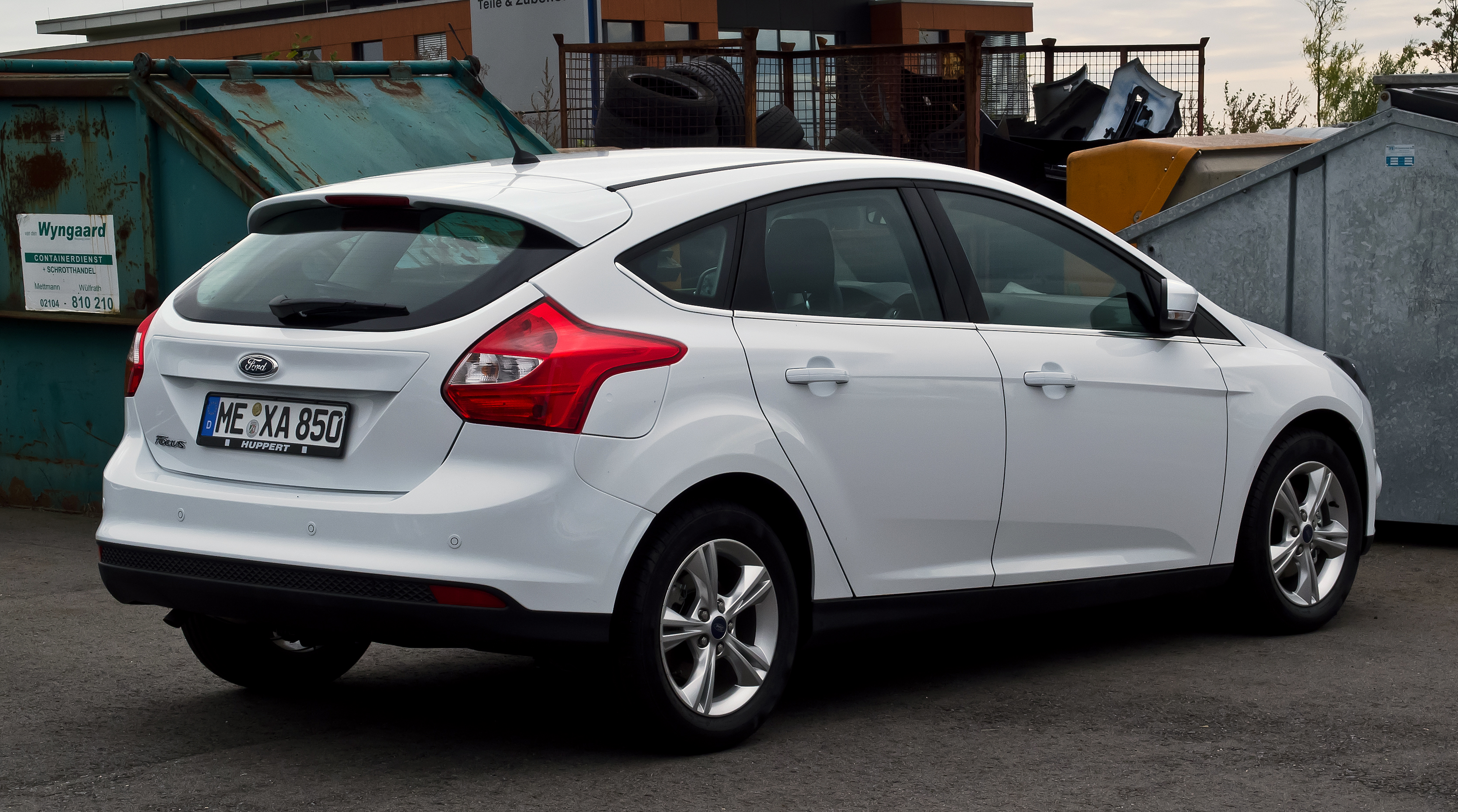
Ford Focus hatchback (pre-facelift)

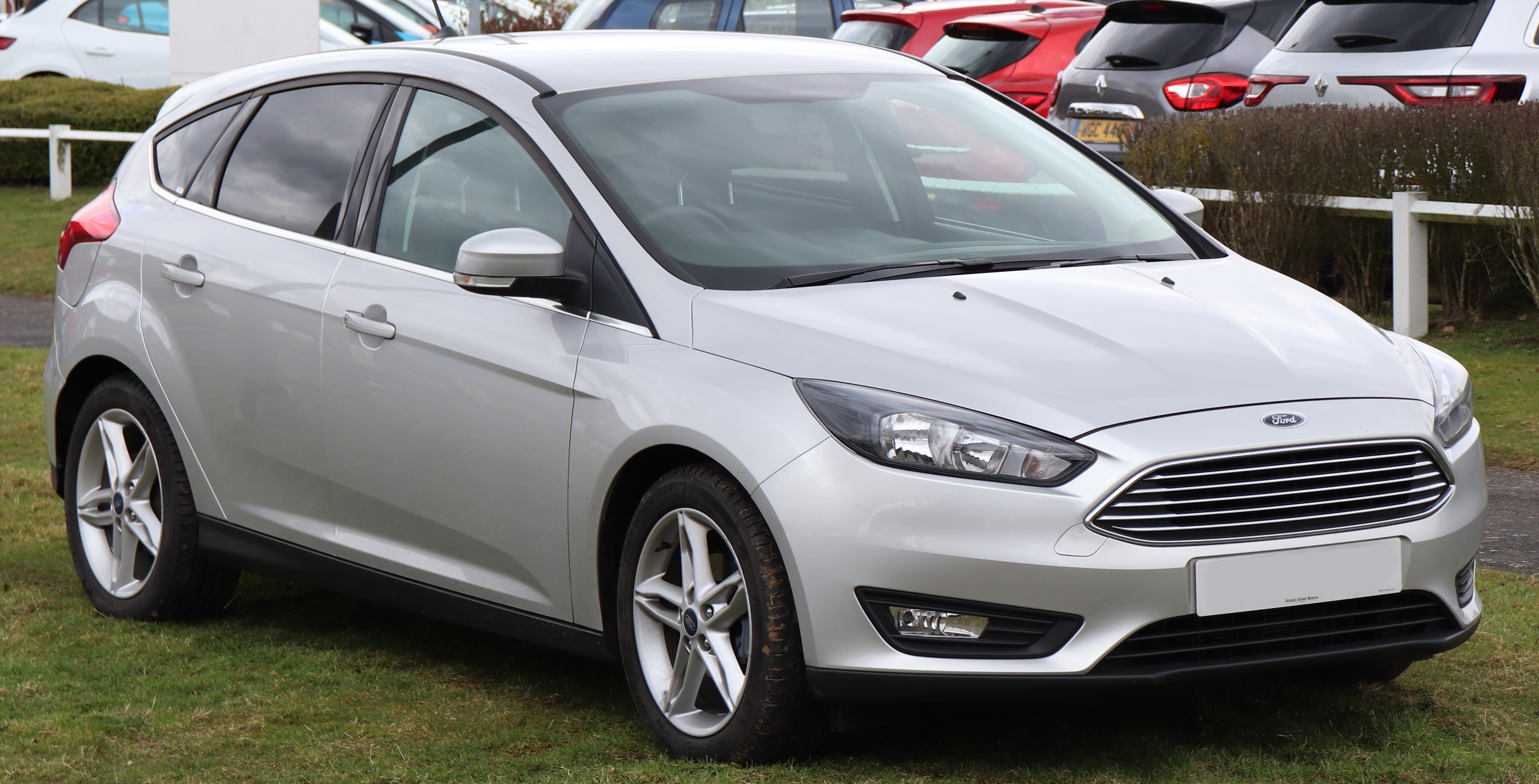

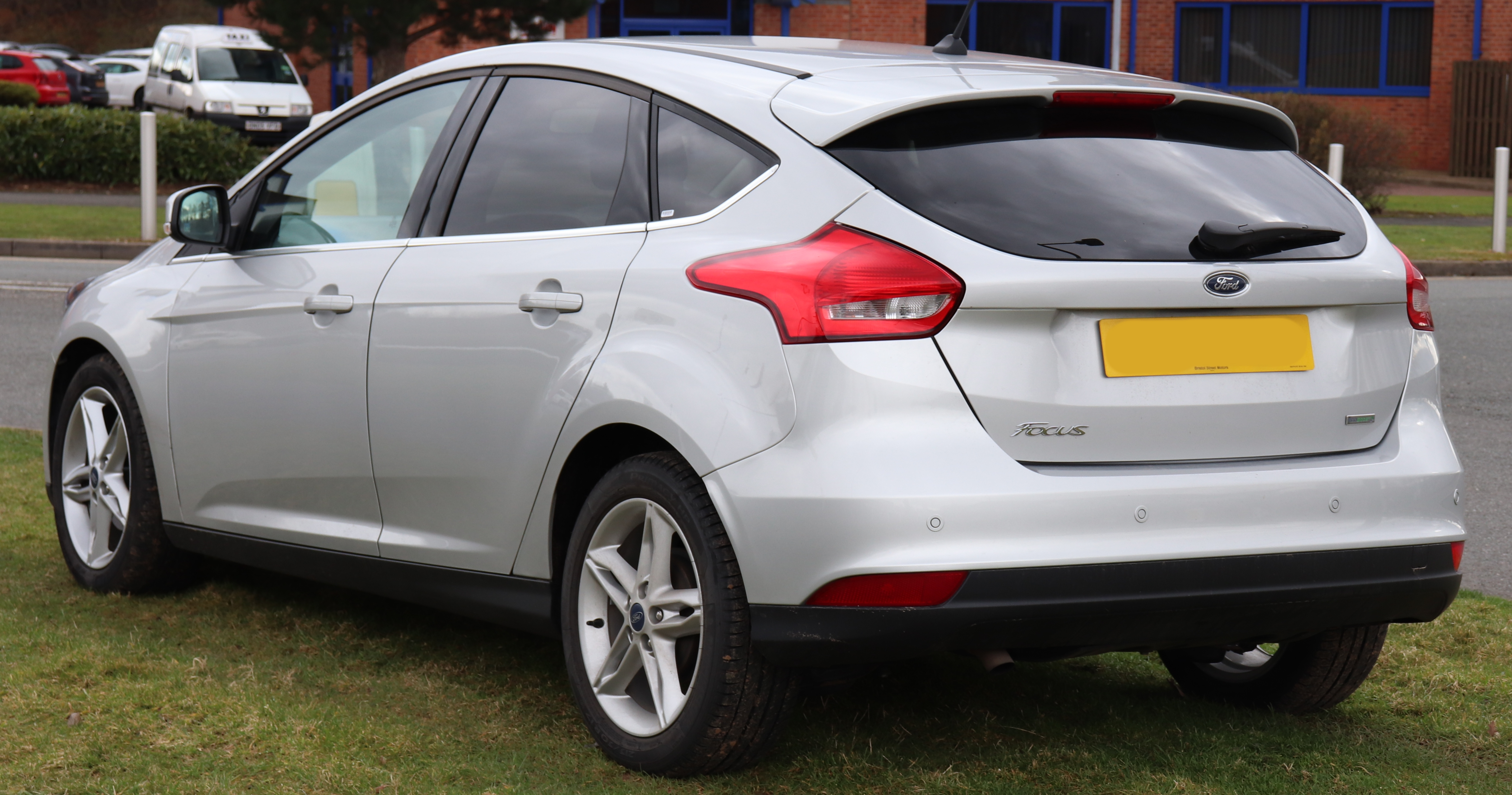
Ford Focus hatchback (Mark III facelift)

For the third generation, Ford reunited both international and North American models by releasing the international Mk 3 worldwide. The previous North American version was discontinued, and the new model was launched simultaneously in North America and Europe in early 2011, both having started production late in 2010.

Ford unveiled the Ford Focus at the 2010 North American International Auto Show. The car shown was a five-door hatchback model, also debuting a new 2.0-litre direct injection inline-four engine. A five-door station wagon was also made available at launch. The new generation launched simultaneously in North America and Europe in early 2011, with production having started in late 2010. Production in Asia, Africa, Australia and South America was scheduled to follow later but the plan for Australian production was later dropped and that market and New Zealand were supplied, along with Asia, from a new factory in Thailand where output began in June 2012.

Ford previewed the third generation facelifted model at the 2014 Geneva Motor Show. The updated version features a new redesigned front end design, incorporating Ford's new family grille and slimline headlights.

The Focus RS returned in 2015 now sporting an updated 2.3-liter EcoBoost engine. Built in Ford's Germany plant Saarlouis, the Focus RS was updated to be given an advanced all-wheel drive system that could send full power to the rear wheels if allowed.

== Fourth generation (C519; 2018) ==
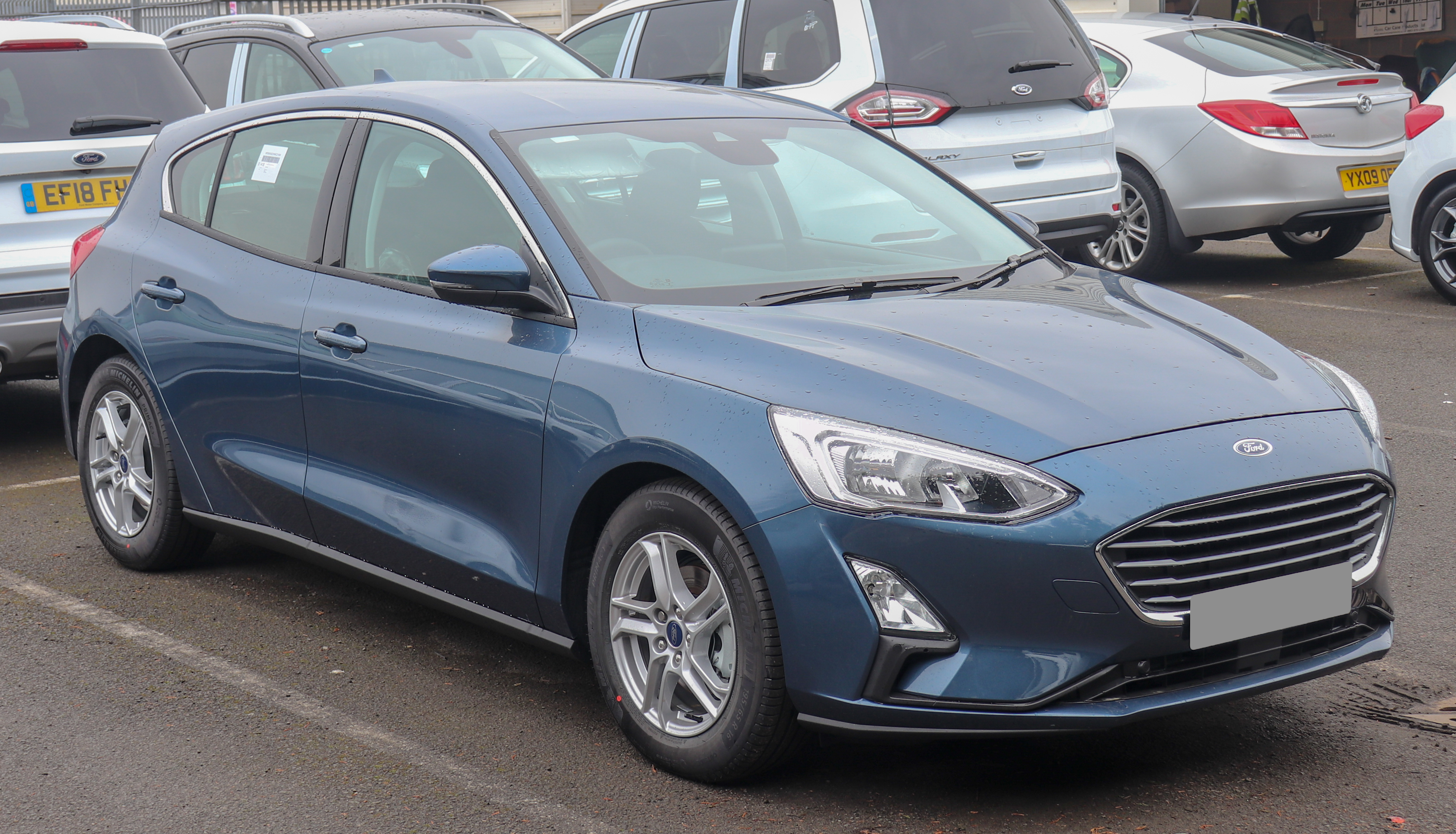

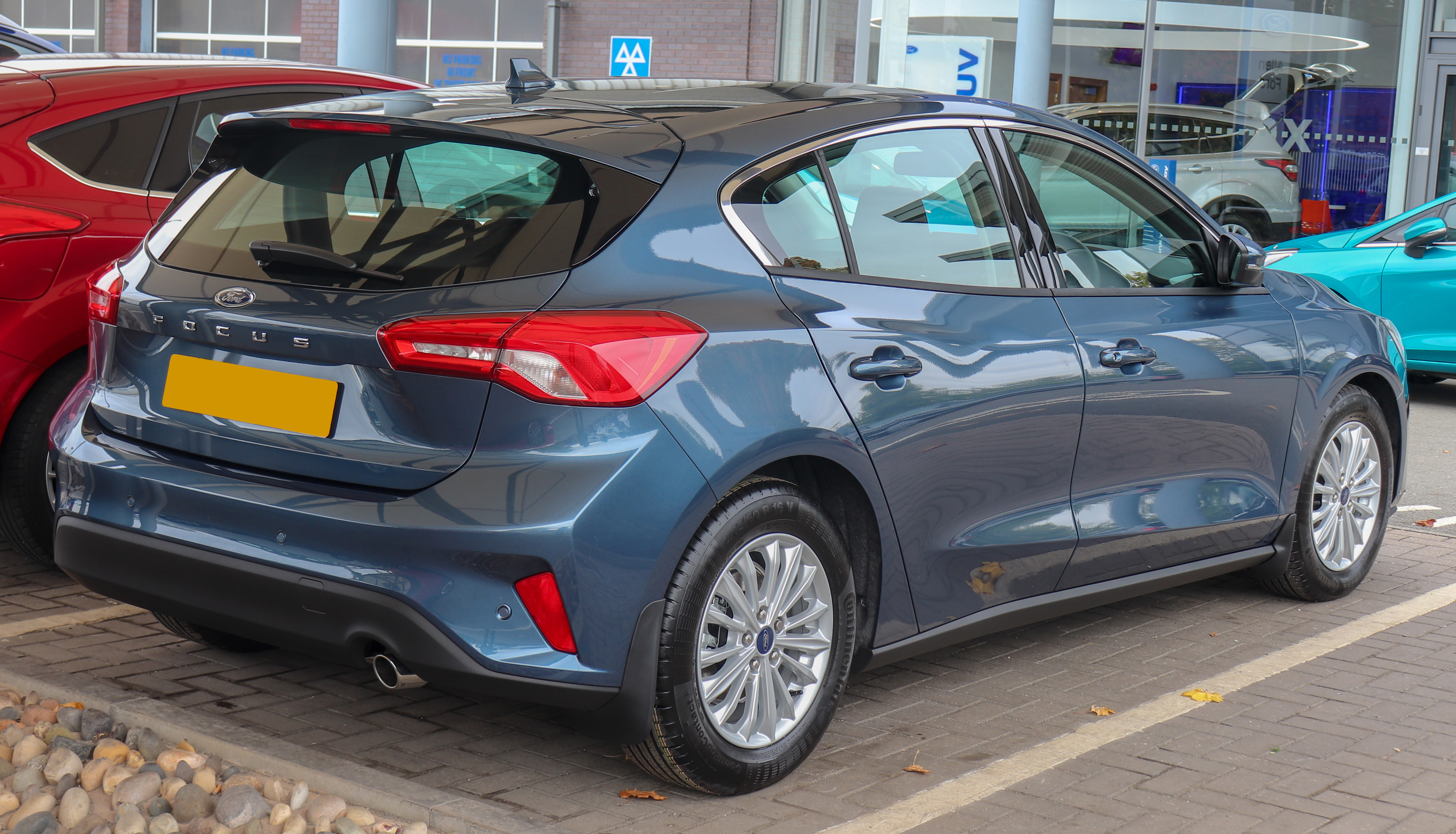
Ford Focus hatchback (fourth generation)

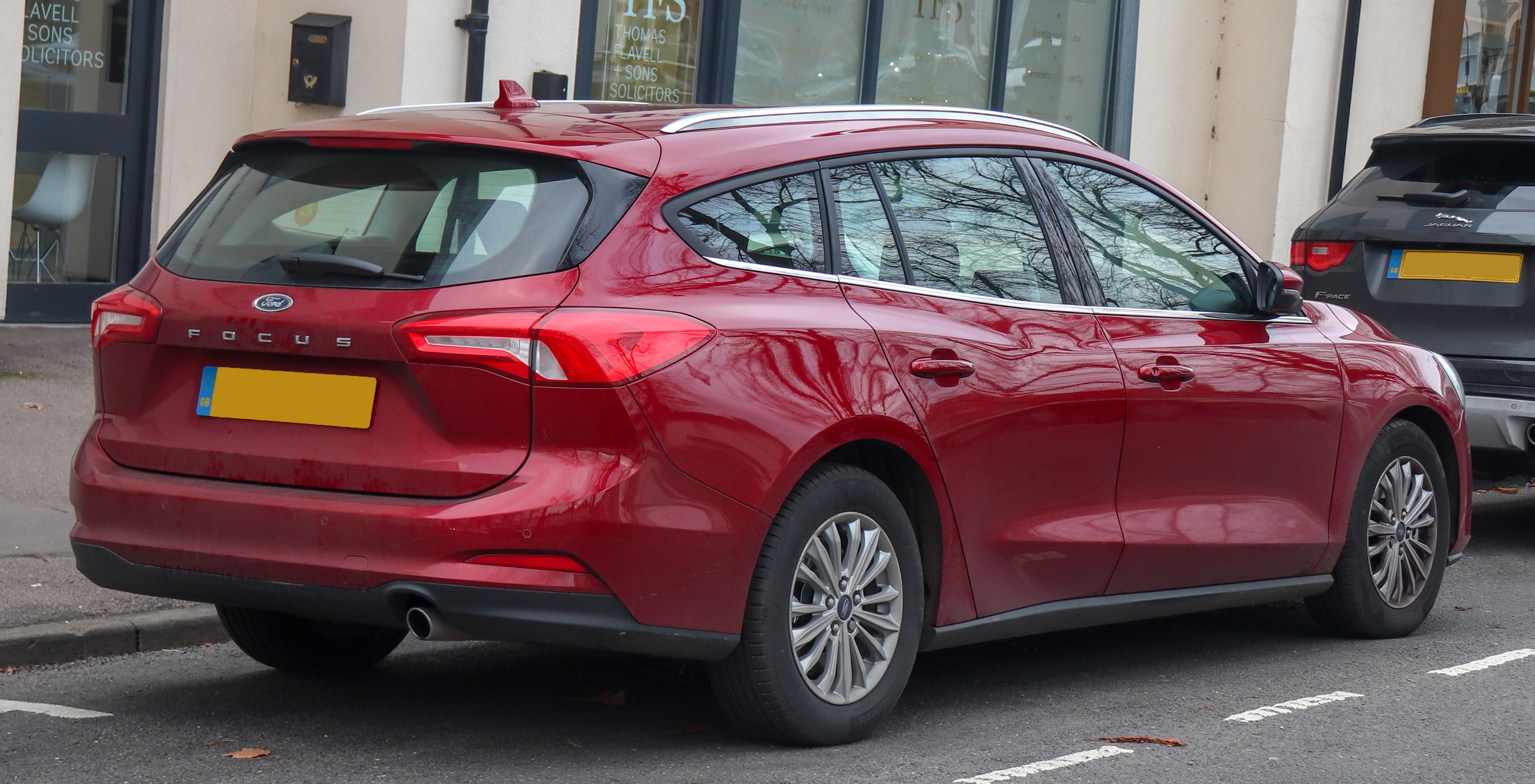
Ford Focus estate (fourth generation)

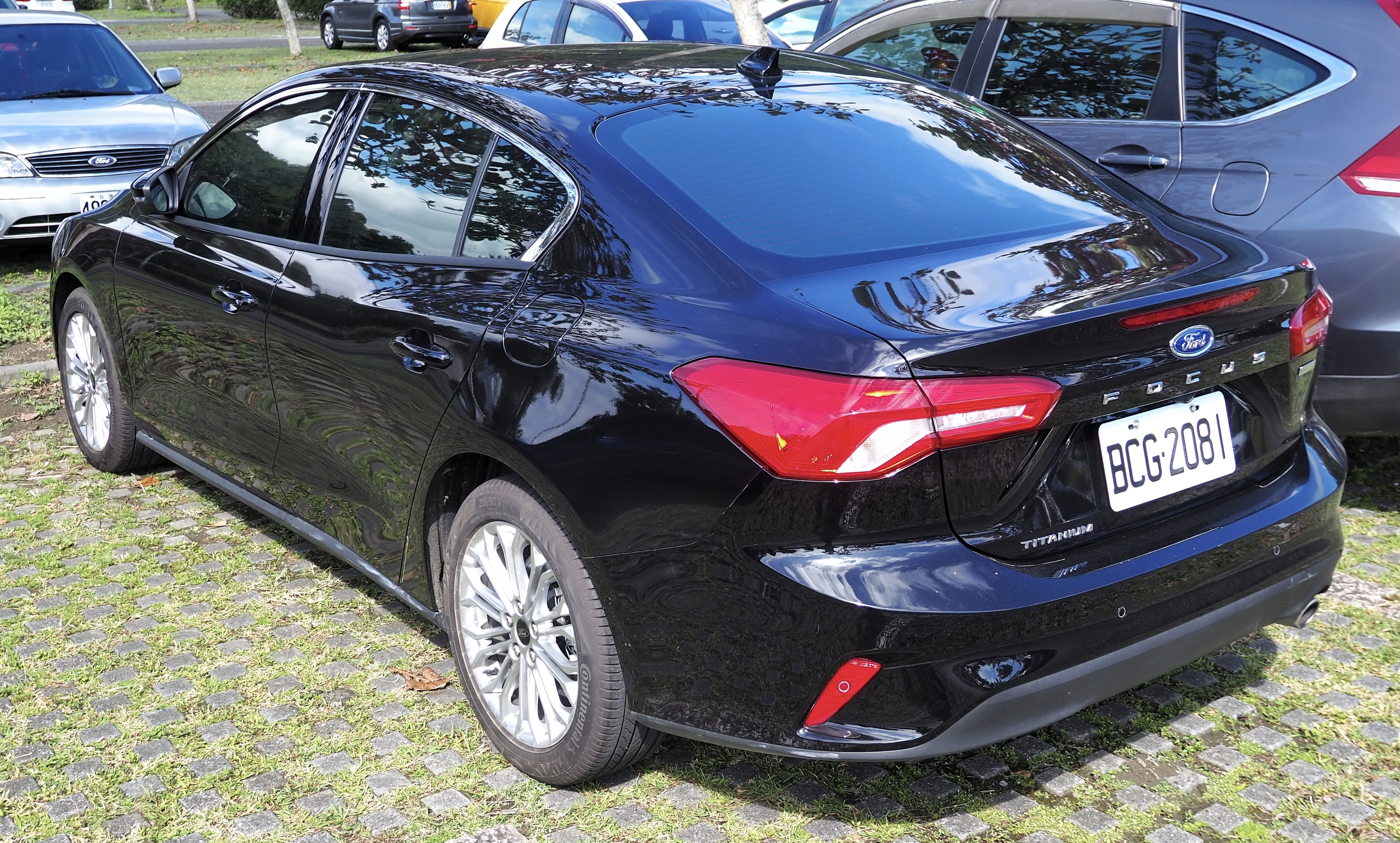
Ford Focus sedan (fourth generation)

On April 10, 2018, Ford unveiled the European and Asian-market versions of the fourth-generation Focus, to mark the brand's 20th anniversary. As in the previous generation, the model is available with sedan, hatchback and estate body styles. A crossover-inspired trim level known as the Active is available with the hatchback and estate body styles. The car also has a Vignale luxury trim level.

The exterior features a sportier design, while Ford described its interior as being simpler. The company also emphasized technology featured in the new model, including the Sync 3 infotainment system, FordPass Connect, and the CoPilot360 driver assistance suite.

In April 2018, Ford announced that all passenger vehicles but the Mustang would be discontinued in the North American market, in order to focus on trucks and SUVs. The Focus Active was intended to be the only version of the model available in the market, but Ford cancelled these plans in August 2018 over tariffs imposed by the U.S. government on exports from China, as the model would be manufactured in the country.

Ford limited sales of fourth generation Focus in its 4-door saloon form in Eastern Europe and select countries in Asia and Africa. Ford no longer offers the Focus in Russia, Belarus and Kazakhstan due to a broader reorganization of their European branch.

In April 2020, Ford confirmed there are no plans for a fourth-generation Focus RS model due to pan-European emissions standards and high development costs.

In October 2021, the model received a facelift for the European market.

In 2022, Ford announced it would discontinue the Focus by 2025, as part of a pivot towards electric and crossover vehicles.

== Motorsport ==
=== Rallying ===
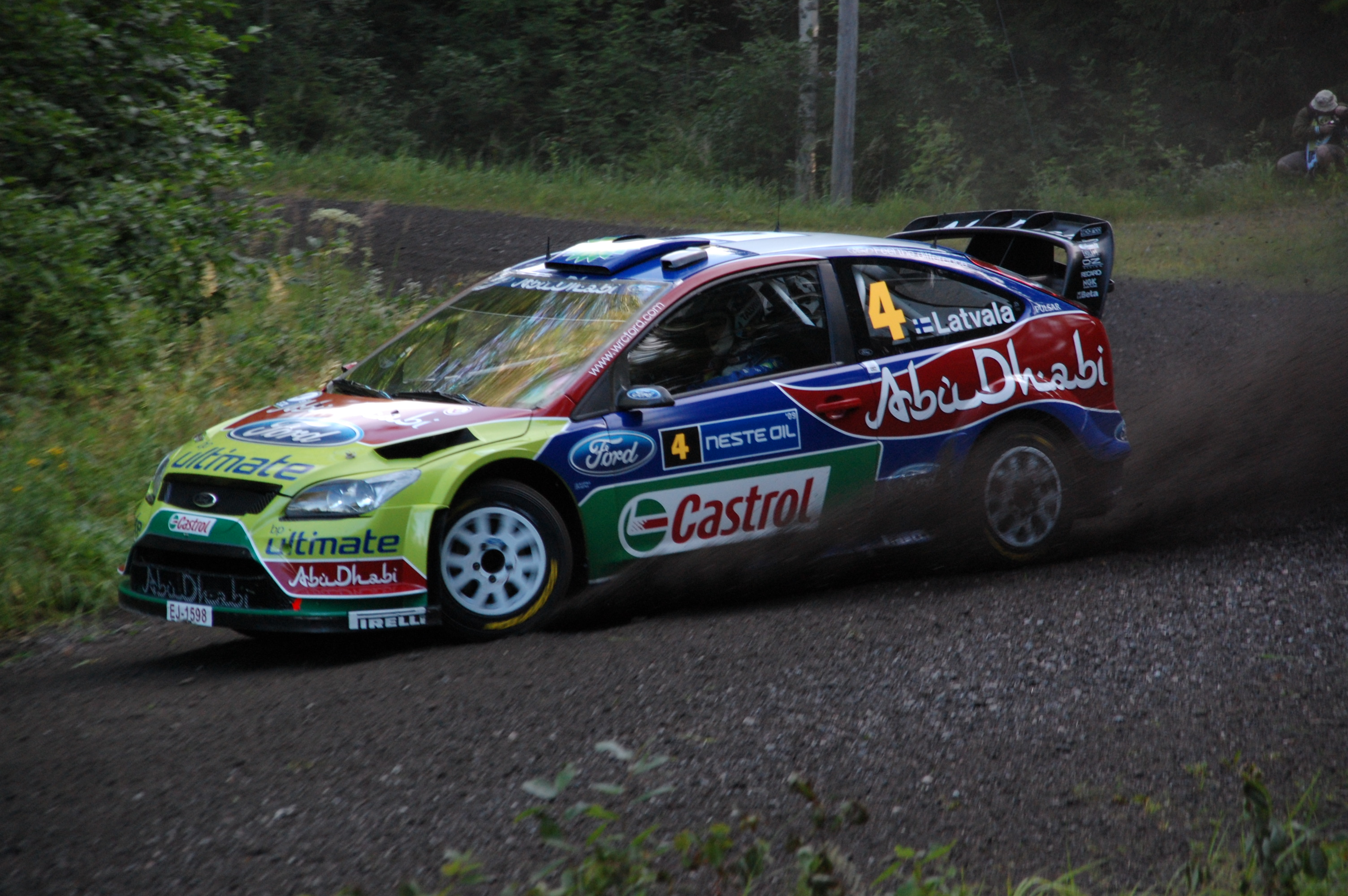
Jari-Matti Latvala with his Ford Focus RS WRC 09 at the 2009 Rally Finland

The first MkI Focus World Rally Car made its debut in rallying and the World Rally Championship on the 1999 Monte Carlo Rally with Colin McRae and Simon Jean-Joseph at the wheels of the two cars, replacing the Escort. It was immediately on the pace, setting many fastest stage times, but an illegal water pump meant that the two cars were excluded from that event. McRae went on to give the Focus WRC its maiden victory on the Safari Rally in February of the same year, and took victory again in the following rally, the Rally Portugal. The MkI Focus WRC went on to achieve further victories over the years for McRae, Carlos Sainz, and Markko Märtin from then until it was phased out in favour of the MkII offering in late 2005.

The second-generation MkII Focus World Rally Car competed for the two-car BP-Ford World Rally Team in the 2006 World Rally Championship, with Marcus Grönholm and Mikko Hirvonen as its drivers. Ford won the manufacturers’ championship, its first in the series since 1979. The team successfully defended the manufacturers’ title in the 2007 season. The MkII Focus WRC remained in use through the 2010 season, after which it was replaced by the Fiesta WRC from 2011.

All of Ford’s rally cars were built, prepared, and run by M-Sport, a motorsport team based in Cockermouth, Cumbria, England. The team was managed by Malcolm Wilson, a former British rally driver.

=== Touring cars ===
Besides rallies, the Focus has also been used in the SCCA Speed World Challenge Touring Car Series, the TC 2000, resulting champion in 2003, 2005, 2010, and 2012.

A Focus was entered into the 2006 Swedish Touring Car Championship season.

The Ford Focus ST made its debut in the 2009 British Touring Car Championship season, with Arena Motorsport. During its second season, the car ran on liquefied petroleum gas, taking the first BTCC win for a car powered by this fuel at Brands Hatch. In 2011, Arena (also known as Team AON) shifted to the newer Focus Mk3, while Motorbase Performance drove the ST version. Both cars had engines built to the Next Generation Touring Car engine rules. Motorbase continues to compete with the Ford Focus ST.

This car won four drivers' championships of the Argentine TC 2000/Súper TC 2000 championship (2003, 2005, 2010 and 2012). The first three of the Oreste Berta Ford YPF team with official support from Ford Argentina.

Arena Motorsport entered two Ford Focus Mk3s in the 2012 World Touring Car Championship season for Tom Chilton and James Nash. The best result was a sixth place by Nash in the Race of Morocco.

In 2008 Ford South Africa entered two modified Focus ST models into Class T (reserved for turbocharged production vehicles) of the local Bridgestone Production Car Championship (essentially a Touring Car formula). They secured the Class T driver's titles in 2009 and 2011.

The car had success in the 2013 China Touring Car Championship, and won its class in the 2014 Liqui Moly Bathurst 12 Hour. The Focus that raced in the 2014 Bathurst 12 Hour was powered by a 5.0 L Ford Coyote V8 engine.

In 2026, a Ford Focus fielded by NAPA Racing won the British Touring Car Championship driven by Ashley Sutton who won a record 5th BTCC title

== Sales ==
Total production of the Ford Focus reached 12 million.

Calendar Year	Europe	China	U.S.	Canada	Mexico	Taiwan	Australia	Thailand	Brazil
1998	29,399								
1999	488,679		55,896						
2000	513,347		286,166						
2001	543,378		264,414						
2002	519,451		243,199						15,612
2003	440,383		229,353						14,743
2004	432,426		208,339	11,422					17,314
2005	449,942	12,391	184,825	26,861					16,742
2006	440,735	79,752	177,006	27,718					17,702
2007	406,944	124,991	173,213	24,013					21,727
2008	364,316	112,552	195,823	32,082			15,623		20,012
2009	313,866	134,360	160,433	21,831	9,602		11,089		26,053
2010	269,412	172,270	172,421	23,452	9,234		9,848		33,826
2011	292,427	188,961	175,717	25,736	11,974		12,863		35,971
2012	241,329	296,360	245,922	27,936	13,123		18,586		31,548
2013	225,102	403,640	234,570	25,781	11,303		19,180		28,768
2014	222,297	391,781	219,634	22,392		12,326	15,116	1,700	30,549
2015	232,160	246,085	202,478	21,101		8,632	7,112	936	22,144
2016	212,083	225,924	168,789	16,627		8,127	6,783	525	12,291
2017	212,353	172,126	158,385	11,306		7,102	5,953	363	10,921
2018	199,197	66,654	113,345	9,546		4,586	3,875	130	7,191
2019	224,401	50,738	12,480	1,545		11,148	3,682		1,677
2020	172,489	34,506	—	—		13,103			24
2021	94,707	22,857	—	—		13,340			2
2022	77,539	15,337	—	—		12,530			5
2023	99,794	4,208	—	—		12,184			
2024		4	—	—					

== Future ==
Ford of Europe's chairman and former president, Stuart Rowley has told journalists in June 2022 that Ford plans to end production of the Focus at the Saarlouis plant in Germany around 2025. Production also ended in China.
