= David Price (South African cricketer) =

South African cricketer (1910–1942)

Personal information
- Born: 13 August 1910; Cape Town, Cape Province, South Africa
- Died: 6 July 1942 (aged 31); HMS Niger, Denmark Strait, off Iceland
- Batting: Right-handed
- Bowling: Right-arm medium pace

Domestic team information
- Years: Team
- 1934–1939: Western Province

Career statistics
Competition	First-class
Matches	14
Runs scored	204
Batting average	13.60
100s/50s	–/–
Top score	28*
Balls bowled	1785
Wickets	48
Bowling average	37.18
5 wickets in innings	1
10 wickets in match	–
Best bowling	5/124
Catches/stumpings	9/–
- Source: Cricinfo, 10 August 2020

David Price (13 August 1910 – 6 July 1942) was a South African first-class cricketer and South African Navy rating.

Born in Cape Town in August 1910, Price appeared in fourteen first-class matches for Western Province between 1934 and 1939. In batting, Price scored 204 runs, his top score being 28* and his batting average clocking in at 37.18. With his right-arm medium pace bowling, Price took 28 wickets with his best bowling being 5 for 124.

During the Second World War, Price served in the South African Navy as an able seaman, being assigned to the minesweeper HMS Niger. On 6 July 1942, while serving in Arctic convoy QP 13, the Niger collided with a British-laid mine and sank, killing Price and 118 other sailors aboard. His body was never recovered and he is commemorated on the Plymouth Naval Memorial.
