= David H. Price (historian) =

American religious studies professor

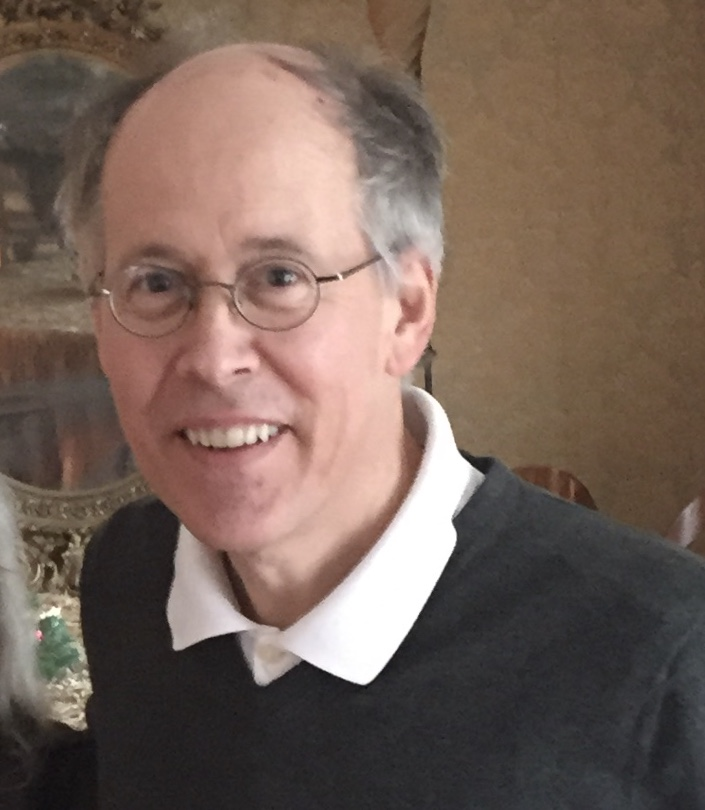
- Born: David Hotchkiss Price; January 29, 1957 (age 69)
- Education: Yale University
- Occupation: Historian

David Hotchkiss Price (born January 29, 1957) is an American historian and a scholar of early modern culture. Professor of Religious Studies, History, and Jewish Studies at Vanderbilt University until 2024, he is now emeritus (Jewish Studies). Price studied classics (BA) and German literature (MA) at the University of Cincinnati before receiving his PhD in German Studies from Yale University (1985). He also studied at the University of Tübingen and LMU Munich. From 2005 to 2016, he was a professor at the University of Illinois Urbana-Champaign. He previously taught at Yale University and the University of Texas at Austin. Price is the author of numerous books and articles on the Bible in English, Reformation drama, humanist poetry, Albrecht Dürer, and Johannes Reuchlin, the Jewish Book Controversy of the early sixteenth century, and religious toleration in the early modern period.

== Selected publications ==
- Defending Judaism: Jewish Writing and Religious Toleration in Early Modern Europe. Oxford University Press, 2025.
- In the Beginning was the Image: Art and the Reformation BIble. Oxford University Press, 2021.
- Johannes Reuchlin and the Campaign to Destroy Jewish Books. Oxford University Press, 2011.
- Nicodemus Frischlin, Phasma. Critical edition of Latin text, with translation and introduction by David H. Price. Stuttgart: Frommann-Holzboog, 2007.
- (Co-author) “Let It Go Among Our People”: An Illustrated History of the English Bible from Wyclif to the King James Version. Cambridge: Lutterworth, 2004.
- Albrecht Dürer’s Renaissance: Humanism, Reformation, and the Art of Faith. University of Michigan Press, 2003.
- Albrecht Dürer. Underweysung der Messung. Electronic facsimile of 1538 edition (CD-ROM). Commentary by David Price. Palo Alto: Octavo, 2003.
- Janus Secundus. Tempe: Medieval and Renaissance Texts and Studies, 1996.
- The Reformation of the Bible: The Bible of the Reformation, with Jaroslav Pelikan and Valerie Hotchkiss, Yale University Press, 1996. (exhibition catalog) Winner of the Katharine Kyes Leab and Daniel J. Leab American American Book Prices Current Exhibition Catalogue Award.
- The Political Dramaturgy of Nicodemus Frischlin: Essays on Humanist Drama in Germany. Chapel Hill and London: University of North Carolina Press, 1990.
