= Dunton Technical Centre =

UK automotive R&D facility

- Ford Dunton

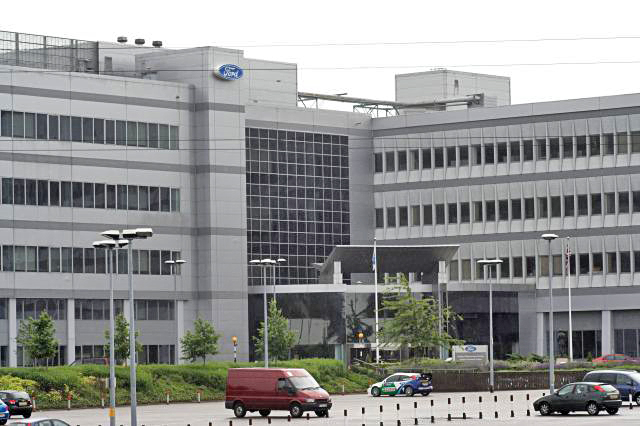
- View from the front

- Location within Essex
- Former names: Ford Research & Engineering Centre

General information
- Type: Automobile Research Centre
- Location: Dunton, Laindon
- Coordinates: 51.581°N 0.405°E
- Elevation: 45 m (148 ft)
- Current tenants: Ford design team
- Completed: 1 January 1967
- Inaugurated: 12 October 1967
- Cost: £10.5 million.
- Client: Ford of Britain
- Landlord: Ford of Europe

Dimensions
- Other dimensions: 268 acres (108.4 ha)

Technical details
- Floor count: 4

Design and construction
- Services engineer: G.N. Haden & Sons
- Main contractor: George Wimpey

The Dunton Campus (informally Ford Dunton or Dunton) is a major automotive research and development facility located in Dunton Wayletts, Laindon, England, which is owned and operated by Ford. Ford Dunton houses the main design team of Ford of Europe alongside its Merkenich Technical Centre in Cologne, Germany. With the closure of Ford's Warley site (located in Brentwood, Essex) in September 2019, the staff from the UK division of Ford Credit and Ford's UK Sales and Marketing departments have moved to the Dunton site. As of November 2019, Dunton had around 4,000 staff working at the site.

== Location ==
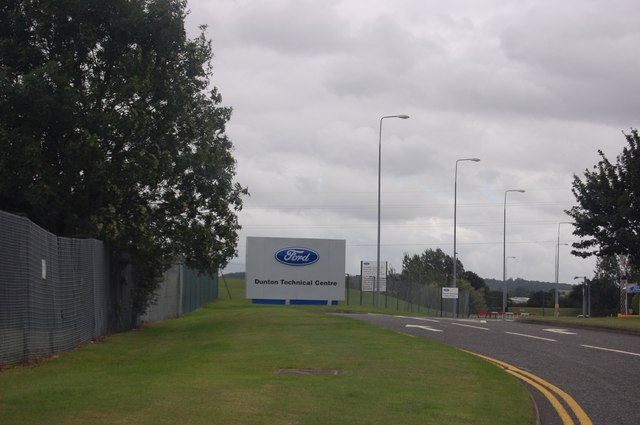
The entrance to Ford Dunton

Ford Dunton is situated at the junction of West Mayne (B148) and the A127 Southend Arterial Road, in Dunton Wayletts in the district of Basildon. An electricity pylon line straddles the site. In front of the building, to the north, is a vehicle test track. To the south is the Southfields Business Park. The site lies in the religious parish of Laindon with Dunton, formerly in Dunton and Bulphan before 1976. Dunton is a small hamlet to the west, with a former church near Dunton Hall. There is a Ford dealership on the B148 on the north-west corner of the site.

In order to promote health and well-being at the site, there are walking routes and outdoor natural areas preserved on the site. There is a picnic area and a pond surrounded by a copse of mixed deciduous trees. The pond is home to many large fish and you can see the protected snail species Helix pomatia.

== History ==
Percival Perry, 1st Baron Perry brought Ford to the UK in 1928.

=== Construction ===
Ford Dunton was constructed by George Wimpey for a contracted price of £6.5 million. The total cost of the centre was around £10 million. The centre originally had 45,000 sq ft (4,200 m^{2}) of space for design work, making it the largest engineering research centre in Europe. Another development site at Aveley had been opened in 1956 which made prototype cars and spare parts, and closed in 2004. Ford's earlier UK design site was at Dagenham and it previously had seven engineering sites around the UK, with five in Essex; these all moved to Dunton.

Ford Dunton was opened by Harold Wilson, then the British prime minister, on 12 October 1967.

=== 1967 to 2000 ===
At the time of its opening, Dunton was assigned responsibility within Ford of Europe for vehicle design, interior styling, chassis and body interior engineering, engine calibration and product planning. Ford's Merkenich Centre in Cologne, Germany was given principal responsibility for body and electrical engineering, base engine design, advanced engine development, exterior styling, homologation, vehicle development (ride, handling, NVH) and transmission engineering. This was a 'systems' approach to the engineering process intended to eliminate the duplication of engineering responsibility within Ford of Europe.

In the late 1960s Dunton worked on an experimental electric car, first shown on 7 June 1967, and called the Ford Comuta.

On 10 May 1971 Peter Walker opened a £1 million engine emissions laboratory at Dunton, the largest of its type in Europe. In November 1974 the world's first automated (computerised) multiple engine (six) test bed was constructed at Dunton, built in co-operation with the engineering department of Queen Mary, University of London. In 1974 a Honeywell 6050 computer was installed at Dunton at a cost of £820,000. The computer was linked to Merkenich and to the Ford test track at Lommel in Belgium. From 1978 Dunton had access to a CDC Cyber 176 computer at the USA base in Dearborn.

Special Vehicle Engineering developed the 4x4 system in the mid 1980s. SVE vehicles had Garrett turbochargers. Many of the RS models had the bodywork made at Karmann in Osnabrück, Germany; the vehicles had Pirelli tyres.

By 1984 staff at Dunton were conducting video-conferences with colleagues at Merkenich, using the ECS-1 satellite, and enabled by British Telecom International.

In the 1980s Ford spent £100m a year on British research. In 1988 the site worked with Prof Paul Shayler of the University of Nottingham mechanical engineering department

The Sierra Sapphire was launched in a £228m development in February 1987, with Clive Ennos and Andy Jacobson at Dunton. A £10m 53,000 sq ft R&D Electronics Technical Centre was built from 1987, to open in early 1989, to develop spark plugs, fuel pumps, and engine management systems.

In 1988 Dunton prepared the way for design of the Mondeo (codename CDW27) by pioneering, in collaboration with Merkenich, the Worldwide Engineering Release System (WERS). Dunton at this time was the most advanced automotive development centre in Europe.

New Zetec engines developed in 1991 under Ian MacPherson, in conjunction with Yamaha.

From 1992 to 1996, 300 engineering jobs were moved to Merkenich. Engine development was largely at Dunton, not Germany. A new four-storey £22m centre was built from 1995.

In 1995 Dunton, in collaboration with the University of Southampton, developed a device which is capable of detecting different types of plastic (for recycling) using the triboelectric effect, including polypropylene, polyethylene, nylon and acrylonitrile butadiene styrene (ABS).

In August 1997 the site developed the 145 mph Mondeo ST24, with a 2.5 litre Duratec V6 engine. On 16 December 1997 Alexander Trotman, Baron Trotman opened a £128 million environmental engine testing facility at Dunton.

=== 2000 to present ===
In 2003 a Silicon Graphics International (SGI) Reality Centre was constructed at Dunton, incorporating SGI Onyx 3000 visualisation supercomputers, using the InfiniteReality3 graphics rendering system.

In March 2010 Ford announced plans to develop a new generation of environmentally friendly engines and vehicle technologies at Dunton following an announcement by the UK government that it would underwrite £360 million of a £450 million loan to Ford from the European Investment Bank. In July 2010 the new coalition government confirmed that it would honour the loan commitment, and the contract was signed in a ceremony at Dunton attended by the business minister Mark Prisk on 12 July.

In recent years Dunton has been responsible for the development of the ECOnetic range of vehicles, and has contributed to development of the EcoBoost range of engines.

In 2020 during the medical ventilators crisis generated by COVID-19, a Dunton Manufacturing team participated in VentilatorUKChallenge consortium and had a major contribution to deliver over 10,000 units to the NHS in just 12 weeks.

== Visits ==
- In 1971 it was visited by the Secretary of State for the Environment
- In April 1989 Virginia Bottomley visited, where she drove the new Fiesta
- Prince Charles had a business meeting on 19 May 1997

== Activities ==
Dunton houses the main design team of Ford of Europe, alongside its Merkenich Technical Centre in Cologne. Currently Dunton has responsibility for the design of the Ford Fiesta, the Ford Ka, engines for Ford of Europe (powertrain), commercial vehicles and the interior of Ford of Europe cars. It has facilities to simultaneously test fifteen cars and around one hundred engines. Around 3,000 engineers currently work at Dunton.

Ford Dunton was also the home of Ford Team RS, and as part of the Special Vehicle Engineering section of Ford created by Rod Mansfield, developed the XR family of 'hot hatch' vehicles with the Ford Fiesta RS Turbo, more recently becoming the RS family of vehicles. Ford also notably worked in this area of design with Cosworth of Northampton.

== Notable staff ==
- Eamonn Martin, 1993 London Marathon winner worked at Dunton
- Colin Stancombe, racing driver, worked at Ford SVE

== See also ==
- BMW FIZ
- Whitley plant – was previously owned by Ford, now Jaguar Land Rover.
- National Engineering Laboratory
