= Jeff Collier =

Jeff Collier may refer to:

- Jeffrey Collier, race car driver
- Jeff Collier (Casualty), a fictional character from the BBC television drama Casualty, played by Matt Bardock
