= Ford Probe =

Liftback sport coupe (1988–1997)

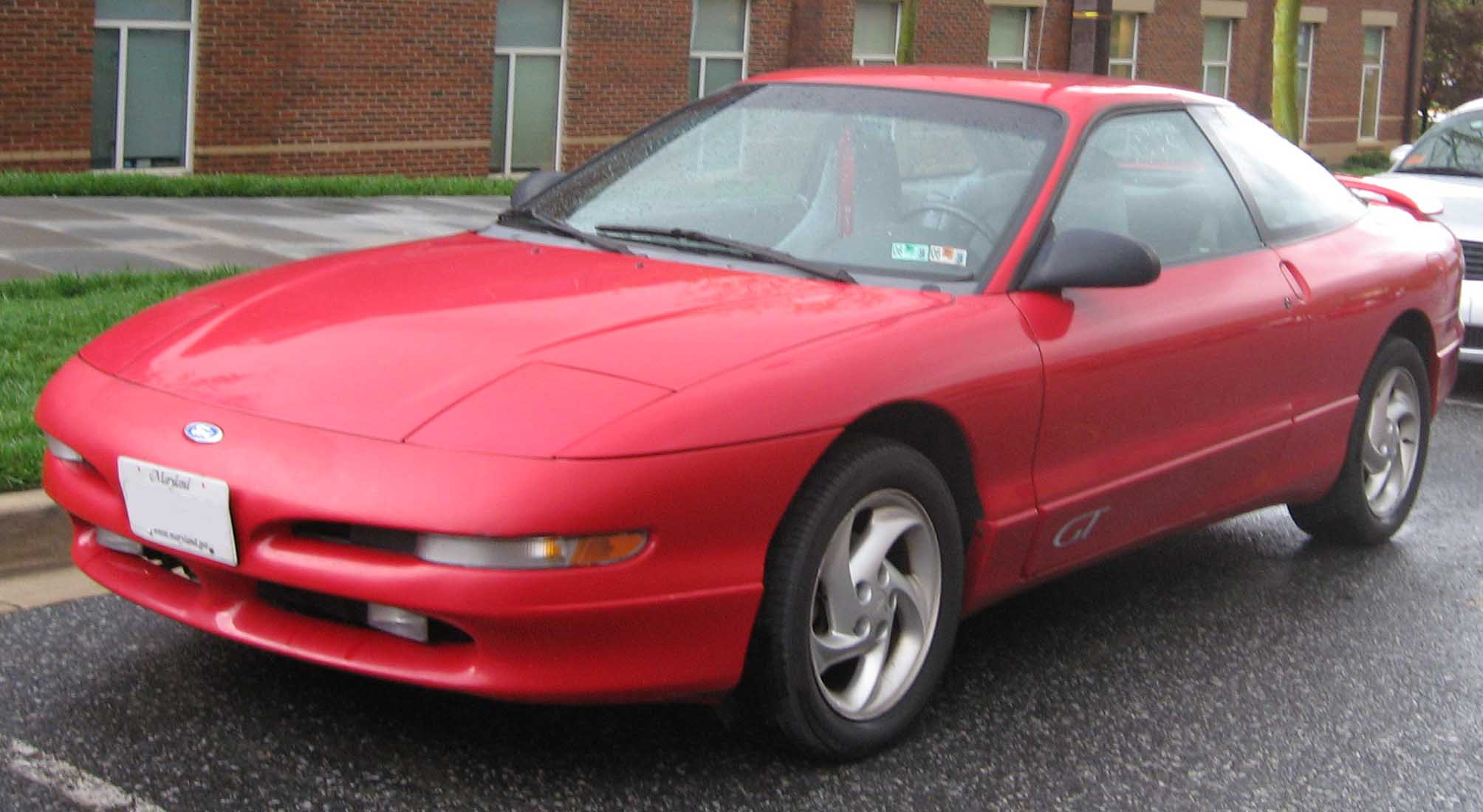

Overview
- Manufacturer: Mazda; Ford Motor Company
- Production: 1988–1997
- Model years: 1989–1997
- Assembly: United States: Flat Rock, Michigan (AAI)
- Designer: Jack Telnack

Body and chassis
- Class: Sport compact
- Layout: FF layout
- Related: Mazda MX-6; Mazda 626; Ford Telstar

Chronology
- Predecessor: Ford Capri (Europe / Australia); Ford EXP (North America)
- Successor: Ford Cougar (Europe); Mercury Cougar; Ford ZX2 (North America)

The Ford Probe is a sport compact coupe that was marketed by Ford from the 1988 to 1997 model years. Taking its name from a futuristic series of aerodynamic concept vehicles, the Probe was originally developed as the fourth-generation Ford Mustang. As news of the design change became discovered in the mid-1980s, a profoundly negative response to the potential new model convinced Ford to maintain the Mustang under its traditional pony car format. To recoup its investment in the project, Ford ultimately released the design under a different name, slotting it above the Escort and Tempo coupes and below the Mustang and Thunderbird.

Developed in collaboration with Mazda, the Probe is a counterpart of the Mazda MX-6, using the Mazda G platform of the Mazda 626. Along with fuel-economy gains associated with the transition to front-wheel drive, the collaboration with Mazda was marketed by Ford with having lower production costs (over the previous Fox platform) and would be acceptable. Developed in the wake of the second fuel crisis, front-wheel drive had gained considerable popularity among consumers. In contrast with the Mustang competing nearly exclusively against the Chevrolet Camaro and Pontiac Firebird, the Ford Probe was a direct competitor against a much wider range of vehicles, including the Acura Integra, Isuzu Impulse, Nissan 200SX, and the Toyota Celica.

The Probe was in the Flat Rock Assembly Plant (Flat Rock, Michigan), initially by Mazda Motor Manufacturing USA. In 1992, Ford purchased a 50% stake of the operation, becoming AutoAlliance International. For 1993, a second generation of the Probe was launched, again based on the MX-6/626. On March 17, 1997, Ford announced the discontinuation of the Probe; the third generation model line that was in development was rebranded as the Mercury Cougar, with the smaller Ford Escort ZX2 also replacing the model line.

== Nameplate origin ==
From 1979 to 1985, Ford and Ghia released the Probe series of futuristic concept cars. Along with exploring the limits of aerodynamic efficiency in exterior design, all five concepts would also explore design elements later used on production Ford vehicles.

=== Probe I (1979) ===
The 1979 Ford Probe (later Probe I) was a wedge-shaped coupe that optimized drag reduction (lowering its drag coefficient-Cd to 0.25) through fully skirted rear wheels and pop-up headlamps. Using a Ford Fairmont chassis, the Probe I was styled as a sleeker version of the Mustang, adopting its 2.3L turbocharged inline-4.

In August 2024, the Ford Probe I was destroyed after its showing at the Pebble Beach Concours d'Elegance when its transport trailer caught fire.

=== Probe II (1980) ===
The 1980 Ford Probe II was a prototype of an aerodynamically-optimized family sedan, previewing a mid-1980s equivalent of the Ford Fairmont. While more conventional in appearance than the Probe I, the Probe II featured covered-lens headlamps, concealed windshield wipers, and a decklid spoiler. Approximately the size of the Ford Tempo, the Probe II was a five-door hatchback; originally developed as an internal design study, the vehicle was first shown as a concept car in 1986.

=== Probe III (1981) ===
Designed by Ford of Europe, the 1981 Ford Probe III was aerodynamically sleeker than the Probe I (reducing its Cd from 0.25 to 0.22). Along with its grille-less "bottom-breather" front fascia (relocating the air intake to the front bumper), the Probe III also featured flush-mounted window glass, composite headlamps, and flat-face wheels; Ford patented several features of its design, including its dual-plane rear spoiler, low-drag side-view mirror mounts, and an aerodynamically active front bumper skirt.

The Probe III served as a direct preview of the 1982 Ford Sierra, which retained many elements of the Probe III design (with the exception of active aerodynamics and skirted rear wheels). Other parts of the Probe III design (including its flush-mounted glass, relocation of the window drip rails, flush-mounted wheels) became parts of 1980s model designs, including the 1983 Ford Thunderbird, the 1984 Lincoln Mark VII, and the 1984 Ford Tempo, along with the 1986 Ford Taurus (the North American counterpart of the Sierra/Granada). In North America, Ford marketed the dual-plane rear spoiler on the Merkur XR4Ti (a Karmann-assembled version of the Ford Sierra XR4i marketed by Lincoln-Mercury).

=== Probe IV (1983) ===
The 1983 Ford Probe IV was again designed by Ford and Ghia. To lower its Cd to 0.152 (rivaling an F-16), the Probe IV broke from multiple design precedents used by four-door family sedans of the time. Though it is a front-engine vehicle (fitted with a turbocharged 1.6L inline-4), the radiator is mounted at the rear of the vehicle; to lower the hoodline, the engine is slanted 70 degrees. While most of the side windows were fixed in place, the lower portion rolled down. For the first time, all four wheels were fully skirted; while the front wheel skirts turned with the front wheels when steering, a membrane minimized airflow entry into the wheel wells.

In an evolution from the Probe III, the Probe IV utilized a full-length belly pan to manage underbody airflow, along with a speed-sensitive front air dam. Fitted with speed-sensitive adjustable ride height, at highway speed, the Probe IV could lower its front axle as much as four inches while raising its rear axle as much as six inches.

Two prototypes were assembled: a nonfunctional vehicle for wind tunnel and development testing, and a second fully functional prototype. After its initial sale in 2002, the latter Probe IV was sold in 2022 to the Petersen Automotive Museum; the aerodynamic test vehicle was sold to an unknown buyer in 2026.

=== Probe V (1985) ===
Shown as a prototype at the 1985 Tokyo Auto Show, the 1985 Ford Probe V remains the most aerodynamic drivable automobile ever built, with a Cd of 0.137 (lower than both the Probe IV and an F-15). As with the Probe I, the Probe V is a two-door, four-seat coupe, though it is the lone mid-engine vehicle of the series. Fitted transversely, the Probe V utilized a turbocharged 16-valve 1.9 L inline-4. In a first for the series, the Probe V was fitted with two rear-sliding doors (using parallelogram hinges instead of tracks).

Designed without traditional wheel wells, the Probe V fully integrated all four wheels into the body design of the car; as with the Probe IV, the front fenders allowed the wheels to turn without any airflow interruption. To further optimize the body design, the side engine vents for the Probe V were only opened as needed for engine cooling; the rear long-tail bodywork used a rearward-sliding rear window as an engine cover (which featured a tailfin for high-speed stability). The four-seat interior featured an electronic dashboard that adjusted in line with the steering column and redundant functions shown on a windshield head-up display; in place of a conventional trunk, the Probe V stored luggage by retracting the lower cushions of its rear seats.

Ford built two examples of the Probe V: the prototype version shown at the 1985 Tokyo Auto Show and a drivable version that was completed in 1986. The latter car was shown by Ford through the 1980s, making an appearance at the 1989 Paris Auto Show.

== Background ==
After the 1979 energy crisis, the economic slump initiated by high fuel prices prompted Ford to give the Ford Mustang a major redesign. The new design would be based on a totally new platform introduced to Ford by Japanese automaker Mazda, who had been partnering with Ford since 1971, and whom Ford had owned a 25% stake in since 1979. Toshi Saito, a North American-based designer working for Ford, took the lead in envisioning styling directions for the front-wheel drive Mustang, and a design by Saito was chosen and finalized in early 1984. The project was then transferred to Mazda in Hiroshima, Japan and in internal Ford parlance, was referred to by the codename "ST-16". It was intended to gradually phase out the RWD Fox platform Mustang under the name "Mustang Classic" and have it eventually supplanted by the ST-16 as the "Mustang."

By 1985, Mazda acquired the former Ford Flat Rock Assembly Plant (then AutoAlliance International) in Flat Rock, Michigan, and intended to commence production of the two Mazda-badged GD platform cars for North America, the 626 along with the MX-6, and the ST-16, contracted by Ford, in 1987.

Christopher Sawyer, writing for AutoWeek magazine, in their issue for April 13, 1987, was the first to publicly reveal the existence of the ST-16 Mustang in a sensational report that featured an artist rendering on the issue's cover of a vehicle nearly identical to what would be released as the 1989 Ford Probe GT stating "Exclusive: The '89 Mustang," along with detailed technical reports about its Mazda origins and switch to front-wheel drive. The public outcry was immediate, with many Mustang fans and pony car purists detesting the ST-16's Japanese engineering, front-wheel drive platform and lack of a V8 engine, which were anathema to traditional Mustang buyers and enthusiasts. Ford Motor Company executives, along with many car magazines received strongly-worded letters of criticism decrying the decision.

Neil Ressler, the then-chief of small car engineering at Ford, spoke about the internal cultural differences at Ford Motor Company which led to a strong disagreement between two factions that had radically different notions about what the Mustang should be:

This idea came forth that we would replace the Mustang with this front-drive car, the ST-16. There were a lot of people who thought that was a great idea—a modern car. There were also a lot of us who were appalled by that. It was like the champagne sipping crowd replaced the beer drinking crowd. The idea that we would replace the Mustang with a Japanese car—a different car from a different culture aimed at a different audience—this is not going to work.

By 1987, Alex Trotman, the newly appointed vice president in charge of Ford's North American operations, with strong urging from Ford Marketing vice president Bob Rewey, a dedicated performance enthusiast, decided that in the light of consumer outrage, the ST-16 would not make a suitable Mustang. At this point, somewhat ironically, Mustang sales, which were lackluster, grew substantially after the article's publication, out of fear that it would be the last opportunity to purchase a traditional RWD V8 Mustang. While Trotman approved the development of a RWD successor, there were many difficulties, notably that the engineering budget for the Mustang was spent on the ST-16 and Ford was still recovering from a financial crisis of the early 1980s that brought the company close to bankruptcy until the Taurus arrived.

John Coletti, Ford's small-car engineering manager and a vociferous opponent of the ST-16 Mustang, said of the project, "I would rather have seen the Mustang name die than put the Mustang name on the Probe ...".

Ken Dabrowski, Ford's small-car line manager, tapped Coletti to lead a skunkworks team that would develop a RWD Mustang successor with the understanding there would not be a full budget to create an entirely new car. Coletti's team heavily revised the 1979 Fox platform for the new car, which eventually became the fourth-generation Ford Mustang released for the 1994 model year.

However, production for the ST-16 was about to commence, meaning Ford had to put it on sale or lose its development budget along with further potential financial headaches if Ford would break its production contract with Mazda. It was decided that the ST-16 would be released as the Ford Probe in 1988, taking the name from Ford's line of futuristic concept vehicles, and be sold alongside the Mustang, which would continue production in its then-current form with minor refreshing. Instead of being aimed as a successor to the Mustang or as a rival to its traditional competitors, the Chevrolet Camaro and Pontiac Firebird, Ford would aim the Probe against popular imported sports coupes of the era such as the Toyota Celica and Honda Prelude.

Both generations of the Probe were sold in Japan as Fords, at Ford/Mazda sales channels called Autorama. Japanese models were not in compliance with Japanese Government regulations concerning exterior dimensions and engine displacement, resulting in Japanese buyers being held liable for additional taxes as a result.

The Probe was a sales success in its first model year, owing to its futuristic styling and enjoyable driving experience. In fact, demand exceeded supply in 1988, enough that buyers were paying list price or higher for a Probe, and Jim Mateja, the automotive columnist for the Chicago Tribune, urged potential Probe buyers who couldn't find a Probe to consider its sibling, the Mazda MX-6. Sales of the first-generation Probe were successful enough that Ford partnered with Mazda again, with further Ford engineering from the beginning of the project, to create a second-generation Probe for the 1993 model year developed alongside a second-generation Mazda MX-6. A proposed third-generation Probe, which would have been based on the Ford Mondeo instead of being Mazda-derived, was eventually released as the 1999 Mercury Cougar in the North American market to strengthen the Mercury brand. After disappointing sales of the Cougar and the waning popularity of front-wheel drive sport coupes in the late 1990s in favor of sport utility vehicles, Ford left the market segment with the 2002 discontinuation of the Cougar, and the 2003 discontinuation of the ZX2.

== First generation (1989) ==
First generation
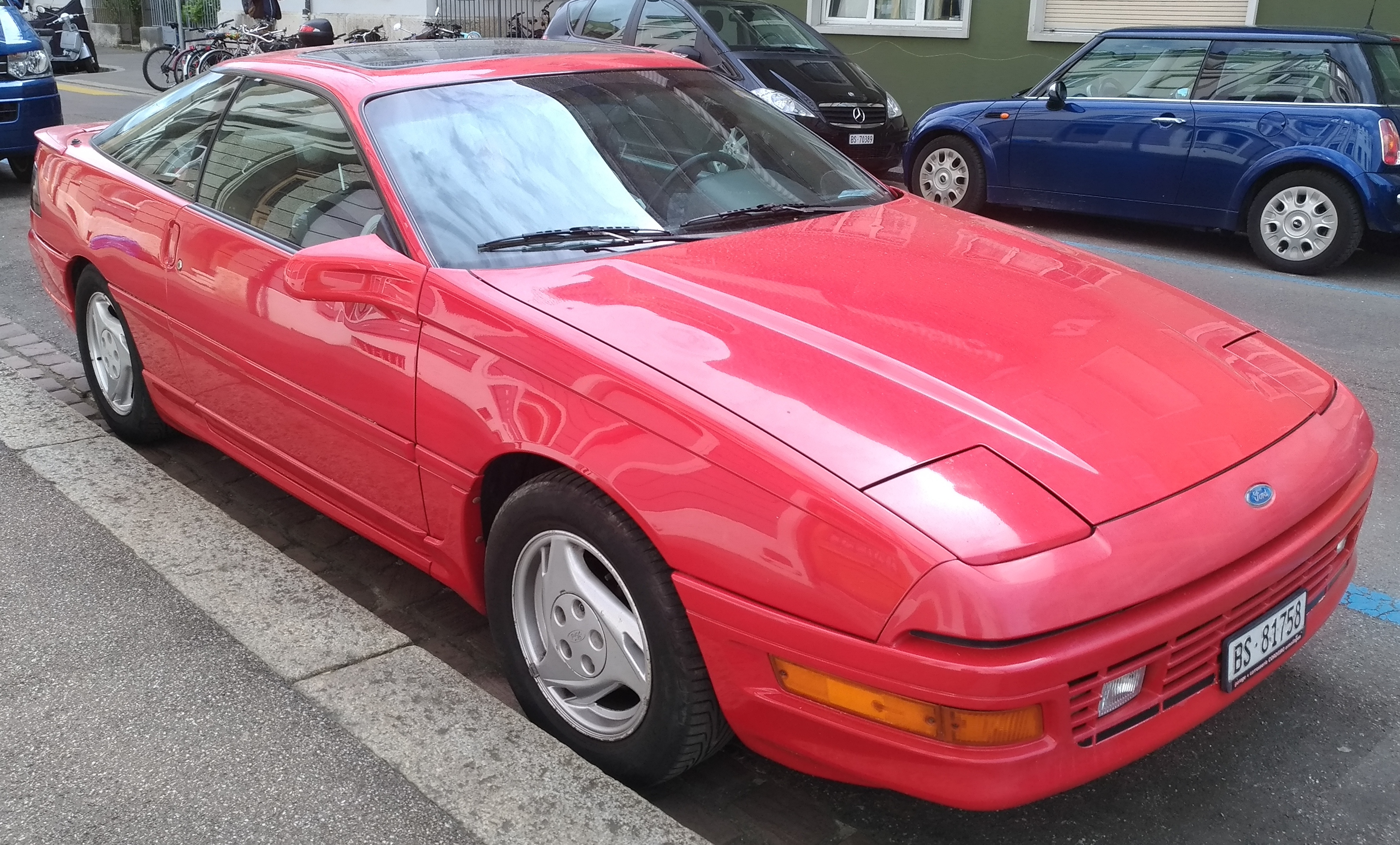

Overview
- Production: 1988–1992
- Model years: 1989–1992
- Designer: Toshi Saito (1983)

Body and chassis
- Body style: 3-door liftback
- Platform: Mazda GD platform

Powertrain
- Engine: 2.2 L 110 hp (82 kW) Mazda F2 I4; 2.2 L Turbo 145 hp (108 kW) Mazda F2T I4; 3.0 L 140–145 hp (104–108 kW) Vulcan V6
- Transmission: 4-speed Mazda G4A-EL automatic 5-speed Mazda M5 manual

Dimensions
- Wheelbase: 99 in (2,515 mm)
- Length: 177 in (4,496 mm)
- Width: 67.9 in (1,725 mm); 1989–1991 GT: 68.5 in (1,740 mm); 1991–93 GT: 68.3 in (1,735 mm)
- Height: 51.8 in (1,316 mm); 1991–93 LX: 51.9 in (1,318 mm); 1991–93 GT: 52.0 in (1,321 mm)

The first generation Ford Probe was based on the Mazda GD platform, and was powered by a 2.2 L SOHC 12-valve 4-cylinder Mazda F2 engine. It debuted in 1988 for the 1989 model year and was produced until 1992 in the United States in Flat Rock, Michigan. The Probe was available in several trim levels that differ depending on the market in which the vehicle was sold. In the United States, the Probe was available in GL, LX, and GT trim levels:

- The GL was the base model with the 110 hp (82 kW)/130 lb⋅ft (176 N⋅m) F2 2.2 L 4-cylinder engine and few options. Most Probes sold in the United States were equipped with air conditioning.
- The LX added options for power locks, power windows, electrically adjusted exterior mirrors, a storage tray underneath the front passenger seat, as well as an optional flip-up moon roof. Starting in 1990, the LX was available with the 3.0 L "Vulcan" V6 engine, that was also used in the Ford Taurus, Ford Ranger, Ford Tempo, and Ford Aerostar. The LX package offered optional equipment, such as a single-disc CD player, and a digital instrument cluster coupled with a fuel economy computer installed in a hidden compartment on top of the center dashboard air conditioning vents.
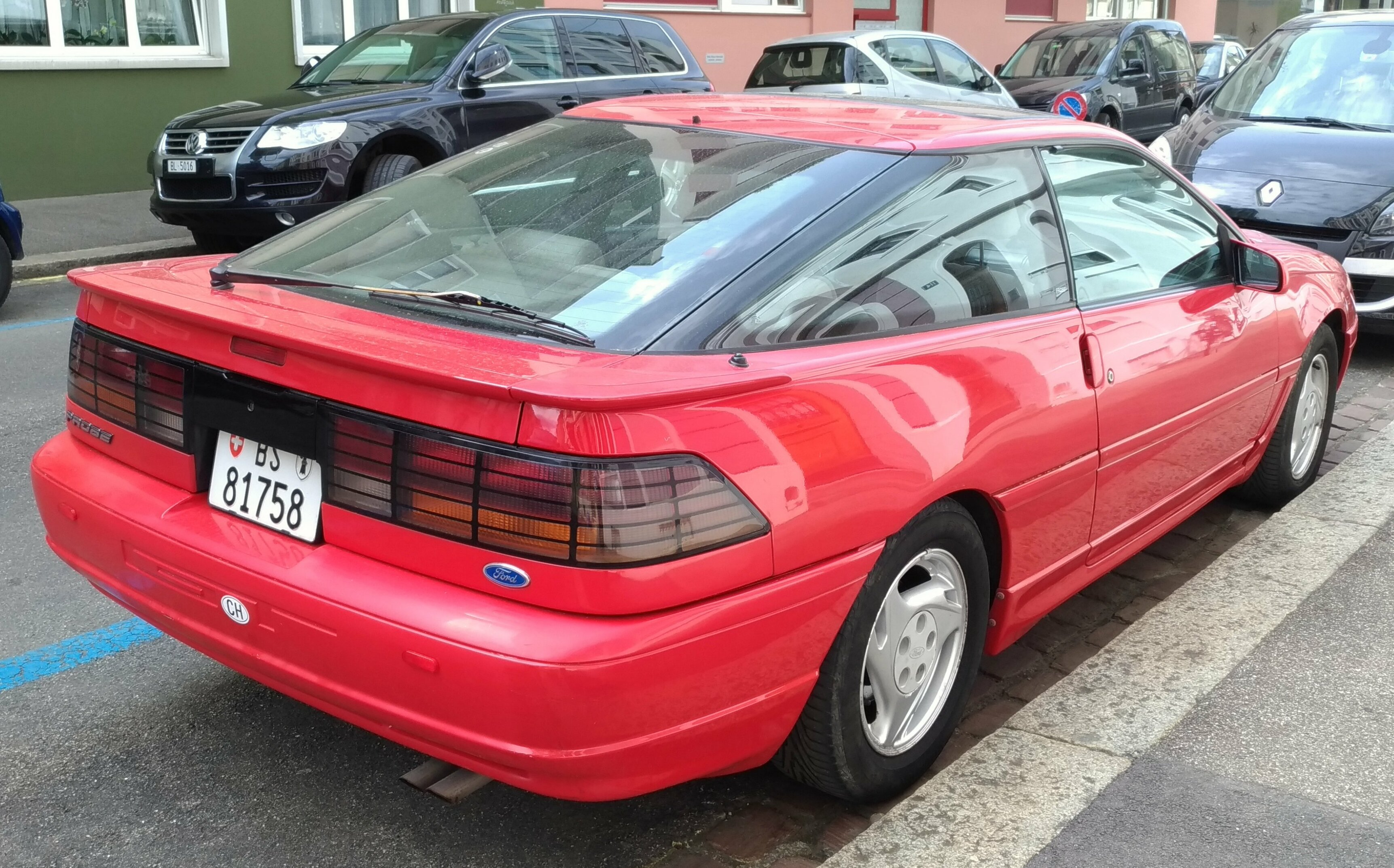
- Ford Probe GT rear
  The GT included all the equipment of the LX, but featured the F2T 2.2 L turbocharged, intercooled 4-cylinder engine that produced 145 hp (108 kW) and 190 lb⋅ft (258 N⋅m) of torque. It came with an IHI RHB5-VJ11 turbocharger and an intercooler to the intake tract, as well as a knock sensor and electronic boost controller to the engine-control system. The boost pressure was 7.3 psi (0.50 bar) in the vicinity of 2,500 rpm. The GT version also came with 4-wheel disc brakes with ABS, a 3-way adjustable suspension utilizing variable damping shocks, and a speed-sensitive variable-assist power steering (VAP). The Probe GT's suspension system was based on a Mazda design, but its tuning was different and included nitrogen-gas pressurized front and rear struts, with stabilizer bars.

The 1991 Probe was given a 4-star crash rating in collision tests conducted by the U.S. National Highway Traffic Safety Administration.

=== Engine specifications ===
Engine Family	Mazda F2	Mazda F2T	Ford Vulcan engine
Engine Setup	2.2 L (2,184 cc; 133.3 cu in) inline-4		3.0 L (2,986 cc; 182.2 cu in); 60° V6
Valve Train	3-Valves SOHC		2-Valves Pushrod OHV
Compression Ratio	8.6:1	7.8:1	9.7:1
Power (SAE net)	110 hp (112 PS; 82 kW) @ 4700 rpm	145 hp (147 PS; 108 kW) @ 4300 rpm	140 hp (142 PS; 104 kW) @ 4800 rpm ('90); 145 hp (147 PS; 108 kW) @ 4800 rpm ('91-'92)
Torque (SAE net)	130 lb⋅ft (176 N⋅m) @ 3000 rpm	190 lb⋅ft (258 N⋅m) @ 3500 rpm	160 lb⋅ft (217 N⋅m) @ 3000 rpm ('90); 165 lb⋅ft (224 N⋅m) @ 3400 rpm ('91-'92)
0-60 mph	9.3s	7.0s	8.2s
1/4 mile	17.0s	15.3s @ 90 mph (144.8 km/h)	16.2s
Top speed	113 mph (181.9 km/h) Electronically Limited	131 mph (210.8 km/h)	113 mph (181.9 km/h) Electronically Limited
Fuel Delivery	Mazda with port-fuel injection		Ford EEC-IV
Fuel Capacity	15.1 US gallons (57 L; 12.6 imp gal)		
Fuel Efficiency	9.8 km/L (10.2 l/100 km; 27.7 mpg_{‑imp}; 23.1 mpg_{‑US})	8.7 km/L (11.5 l/100 km; 24.6 mpg_{‑imp}; 20.5 mpg_{‑US})	7.3 km/L (13.7 l/100 km; 20.6 mpg_{‑imp}; 17.2 mpg_{‑US})
NET Weight	2,730 lb (1,238 kg) (MT) 2,810 lb (1,270 kg) (AT)	3,000 lb (1,360.8 kg) (MT) 3,035 lb (1,377 kg) (AT)	2,970 lb (1,347.2 kg) (MT) 3,070 lb (1,390 kg) (AT)

=== Production figures ===
Ford Probe Production Figures
	Yearly Total
1989	162,889
1990	109,898
1991	73,200
1992	41,035
Total	387,022

== Second generation (1993) ==
Second generation
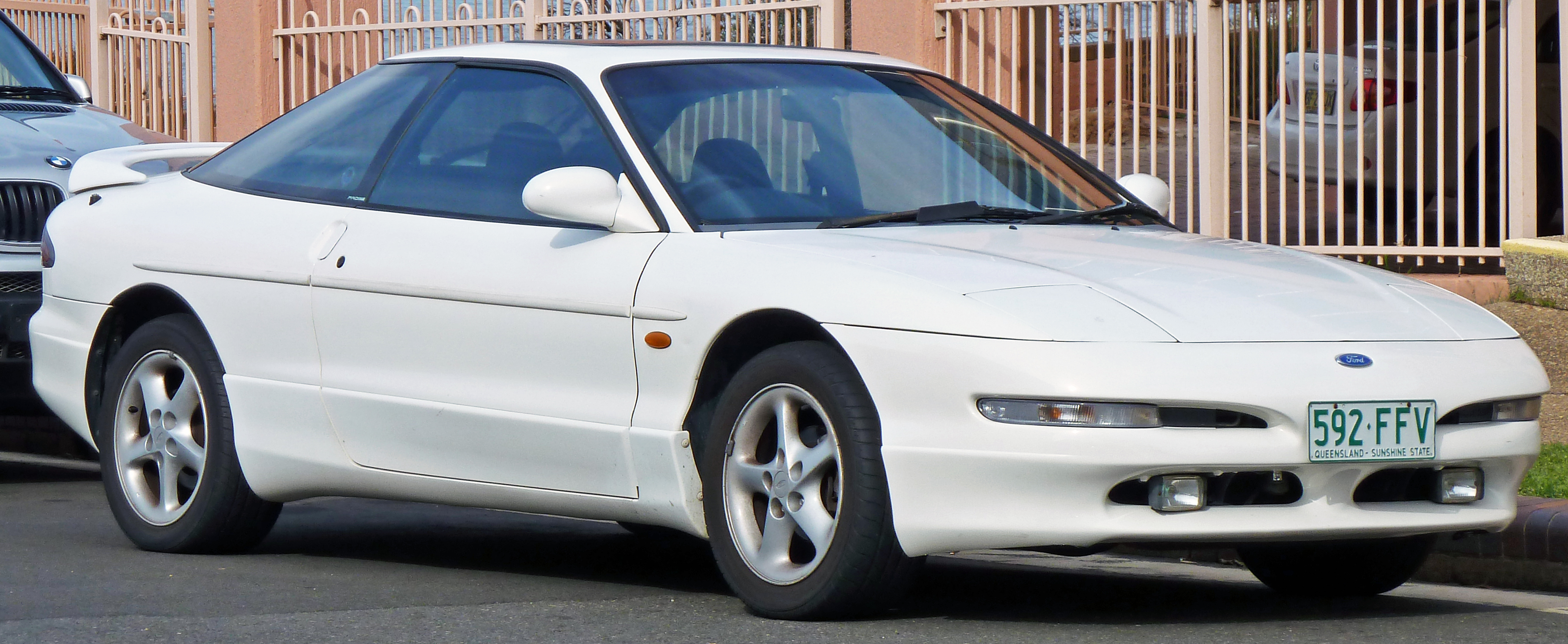

Overview
- Production: 1992 – June 20, 1997
- Model years: 1993–1997
- Designer: Mimi Vandermolen (1989)

Body and chassis
- Body style: 3-door liftback
- Platform: Mazda GE platform

Powertrain
- Engine: 2.0 L 118 hp (88 kW) I4; 2.5 L 164 hp (122 kW) V6
- Transmission: 4-speed automatic 5-speed manual

Dimensions
- Wheelbase: 1993–94: 102.9 in (2,614 mm); 1994–97: 102.8 in (2,611 mm)
- Length: 1993–94: 178.9 in (4,544 mm); 1994–97 Base: 178.7 in (4,539 mm); 1994–97 GT: 179.5 in (4,559 mm)
- Width: 69.8 in (1,773 mm)
- Height: 51.6 in (1,311 mm); 1993–94 GT: 51.8 in (1,316 mm)
- Curb weight: 2,619–2,892 lb (1,188–1,312 kg)

The Ford and Mazda design teams merged once again to give the Ford Probe a complete redesign for the 1993 model year. As before, the Probe was to share its under-structure with Mazda's MX-6 and 626. Mazda engineered the engine, transmission, and chassis, while Ford engineered the body and interior. Technically, the second generation Probe is 60% Mazda and 40% Ford. Despite the car being extended and widened 2 in (50 mm) it was 125 pounds (60 kg) lighter than the first generation Probe. The second generation Probe was introduced in August 1992 as a 1993 model. As first planned during 1992, it finally went on sale in Europe in the spring of 1994, filling the gap left there by Ford in that market sector since the demise of the Capri seven years earlier. The Capri had regularly been one of Britain's 10 best selling cars throughout the 1970s, but its popularity declined in the early 1980s as Ford launched high performance versions of the Fiesta, Escort and Sierra hatchbacks. Such was the falling demand for this type of car that by 1986, when the end of Capri production was announced, Ford decided against launching a direct replacement.

The second-generation Probe was designed by a team led by Mimi Vandermolen, who led the interior design of the 1986 Ford Taurus. In 1987, Vandermolen became the first female designer to be the design executive of small cars for an automobile manufacturer, and Vandermolen designed the Probe to improve the driving experience for women, stating "If I can solve all the problems inherent in operating a vehicle for a woman, that'll make it that much easier for a man to use."

However, the late 1980s and early 1990s saw the sales of affordable sports cars recover, first with a rising demand for Japanese built models like the Honda Prelude, Nissan Silvia, and Toyota Celica, and then with the Volkswagen Corrado and the Vauxhall/Opel Calibra from Ford's direct competitor General Motors. By 1992, Ford had decided that there was now justifiable demand in Europe for a new affordable sports coupe to be launched.

Ford had been hoping to sell around 20,000 Probes each year in Britain as the car market recovered from the effects of the recession from 1992, but in the three years it was sold there, a total of just over 15,000 were sold - around a quarter of the projected figure for that length of time. Imports ceased during 1997, and its Cougar successor - launched a year later - was even less successful, being imported to Europe for just two years.

As of late 2025, just 212 examples of the Probe were still in use in Britain.

The base model started at just over US$13,000 and came standard with the 2.0 L Mazda FS 16-valve 4-cylinder engine, performance instrument cluster with tachometer and full gauge complement, and an electronic AM/FM stereo. The sportier GT model started at $15,504 and came standard with the 2.5 L Mazda K engine KL-DE 24-valve V6, low profile P225/50VR16 91V Goodyear VR50 Gatorback tires, 4-wheel disc brakes, unique front and rear fascias, fog lights, 5-spoke aluminum wheels, leather-wrapped steering wheel, and driver-seat power lumbar/seat back side bolster adjustment. Both engines featured dual overhead cam designs with the choice of a 5-speed manual transmission or a 4-speed automatic transmission.

Two automatic transmissions were available in the Probe. At first both engines shared the same automatic transmission, the Ford F-4EAT transmission, but from 1994 onwards this changed. The V6 engine continued to use the 4EAT, but the 2.0 L I4 engine used a different automatic transmission, the Ford CD4E transmission. It was sourced by Ford, and manufactured at Ford's Batavia Transmission plant in Batavia, Ohio.

A new SE (Sport Edition) trim level was available for 1995 and 1996. It included the GT front fascia (without fog lamps), unique 15-inch (380 mm) aluminum wheels, P205/55R15 BSW and Sport Edition "SE" nomenclature.

In a coast to coast road test by Automobile Magazine in search of the best cars in the world, the Probe GT scored third place, behind an $80,000 Mercedes-Benz and an $80,000 BMW. In the article, the Probe listed at about $15,000.

=== Special editions ===
For 1993 and 1994, Ford offered an "SE" appearance package on the base model Probe. The package offered 3 spoke swirl-style alloy wheels, the GT model's ground effects, and the GT model's front bumper. Unlike the base model, buyers were able to opt for power windows and mirrors on the SE package. Appearance wise, the only noticeable differences from the GT model were the wheels, "SE" nomenclature, rear bumper w/o air slot and lack of fog lights. "SE" was an appearance package and not an actual model or trim level. "SE" became a trim level in 1995 and was the middle-grade model in the Probe lineup between base and GT models.

In 1994, Ford released a limited edition of the Probe, marketed as the Probe "Feature Car", but officially called the "GT Plus" package. This special package is better known to the general public and enthusiast community as the Probe "Wild Orchid Edition". Included on this limited appearance package was Wild Orchid exterior paint, "PROBE" badge on floor mats outlined in Wild Orchid, black cloth bucket seats with unique Wild Orchid inserts, and the "PROBE" badge on the rear outlined in Wild Orchid. This package was offered in 1994 only, and was exclusive to GT models. After dropping the Probe Feature Car after only a year of production, Ford carried over the Wild Orchid exterior color for the 1995 model year which was available on all Probe models.

In 1997, a "GTS" package was offered on the Probe GT. It was essentially nothing more than an appearance package, as performance was identical to the GT, but differences with the exterior were distinct. Dual racing stripes available in either white or black started at the top edge of the front bumper and continued on to the back lip of the hatch, terminating just below the center light reflector on the rear bumper. A chrome plated version of the GT's directional "swirlie" wheels and a spoiler were also included in the package, as well as having a "blank" center reflector which lacked "GT" lettering as the regular GT models have. The "GTS" was an appearance package and not an actual model or trim level. Very few Probes were produced with the GTS package and are considered today to be extremely rare.

=== Models/trim levels ===
- Base • 1993–1995; 1997
- SE • 1995–1996
- GT • 1993–1997

In most other markets outside North America, trim levels were labeled as simply 16v (I4) and 24v (V6).

=== Appearance packages ===
- SE • 1993–1994
- GT Plus (Wild Orchid Edition) • 1994
- GTS • 1997
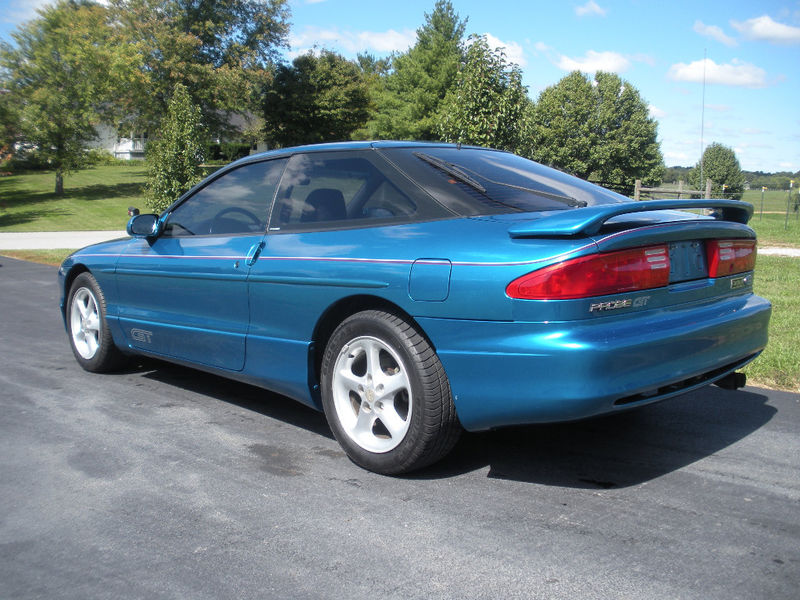
1993 Ford Probe GT

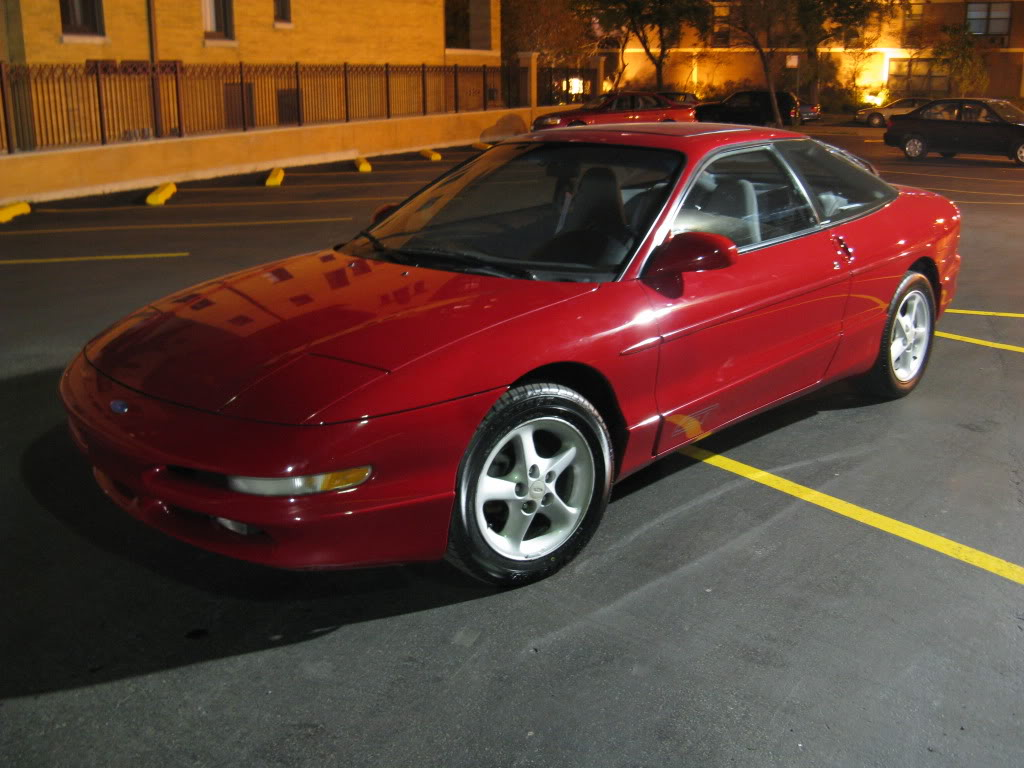
1994 Ford Probe GT

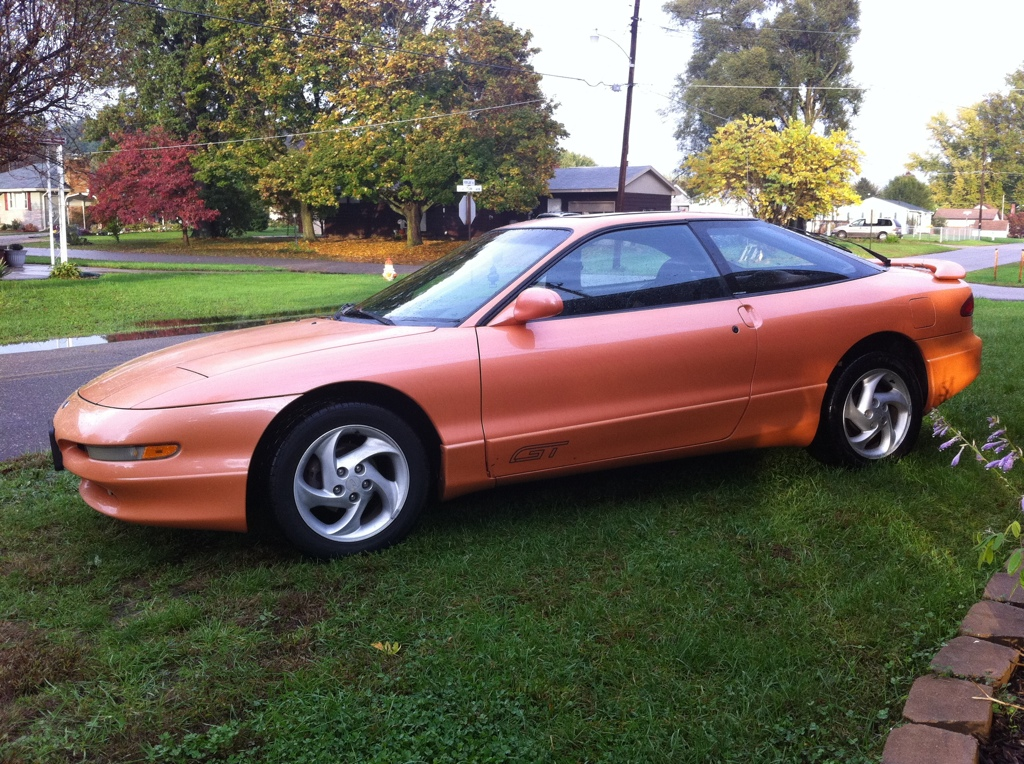
1995 Ford Probe GT

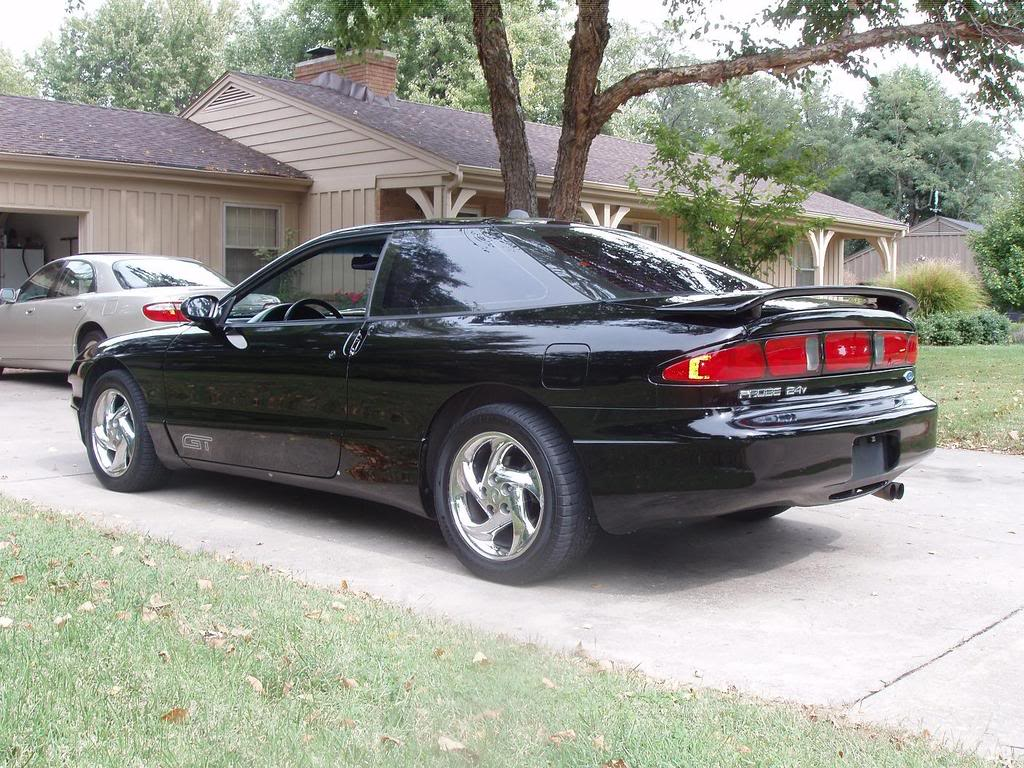
1996 Ford Probe GT

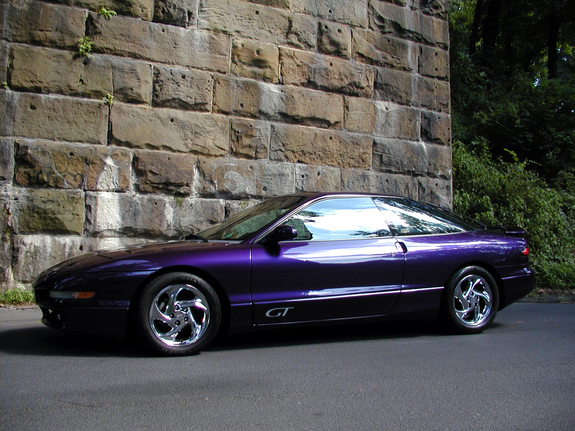
1997 Ford Probe GT

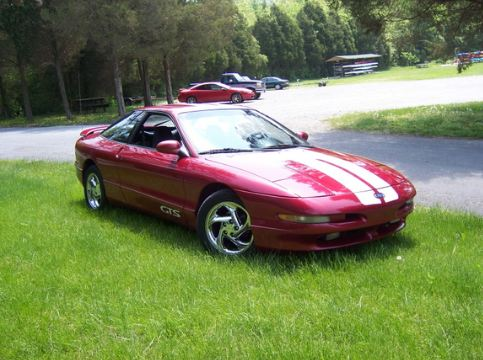
1997 Ford Probe GTS

=== Engine specifications ===
Engine Family	Mazda FS	Mazda KL-DE
Engine Setup	2.0 L (1,991 cc; 121.5 cu in) inline-4	2.5 L (2,497 cc; 152.4 cu in); 60° V6
Valve Train	4-valves DOHC	
Compression Ratio	9.0:1	9.2:1
Power (SAE net)	118 hp (119.6 PS; 88.0 kW) @ 5500 rpm	164 hp (166.3 PS; 122.3 kW) @ 5600 rpm ('93-'95); 164 hp (166.3 PS; 122.3 kW) @ 6000 rpm ('96-'97)
Torque (SAE net)	127 lb⋅ft (172.2 N⋅m) @ 4500 rpm	156 lb⋅ft (211.5 N⋅m) @ 4000 rpm ('93-'95); 160 lb⋅ft (216.9 N⋅m) @ 4800 rpm ('96-'97)
0-60 mph	9.6s	7.0s (MT); 8.5s (AT)
1/4 mile	16.8s	15.5s @ 89 mph (143.2 km/h)
Top speed	113 mph (181.9 km/h) (electronically limited)	133 mph (214.0 km/h) (MT); 127.5 mph (205.2 km/h) (AT)
Fuel Capacity	15.5 Gallons	
Fuel Efficiency	11.8 km/L (8.5 l/100 km; 33.2 mpg_{‑imp}; 27.7 mpg_{‑US})	8.9 km/L (11.2 l/100 km; 25.2 mpg_{‑imp}; 21.0 mpg_{‑US})
NET Weight	2,619 lb (1,188.0 kg) (MT); 2,712 lb (1,230.1 kg) (AT)	2,815 lb (1,276.9 kg) (MT); 2,892 lb (1,311.8 kg) (AT)

=== 1994 ===
- The 1994 Ford Probe becomes one of the first production cars to have dual airbags as standard equipment
- The dashboard gets a major overhaul. It now used completely different materials, and the right side is redesigned to house a passenger airbag
- Ford introduces the Probe in the European market
- Foglights are slightly redesigned and now made by a different company
- The stripe on the dashboard is gone, but remains on the interior panels
- The stripe color on Probe GT's door panels are changed from red to the color of the car's interior
- New Ford CD4E automatic transaxle for base and SE models
- "V6 DOHC 24 VALVE" emblem on engine intake manifold is no longer indented into the manifold and is now raised
- The button to raise the pop up headlights is removed but the wiring remained, the button could be added to restore function
- Fog light button on GT's is slightly redesigned

=== 1995 ===
- Redesigned tail lights; the base/SE models are outlined in black, the GT's are outlined in red
- SE becomes a trim level/model
- The wiring to raise the headlights without turning them on is removed
- SE model no longer has the GT's ground effects/side skirts
- Distributors are redesigned for better reliability
- New alloy wheels for SE and GT (3-spoke 15-inch directional for SE, 5-spoke 16-inch directional "swirlies" for GT)
- Two interior colors are dropped, Red and blue
- Interior panels no longer have a stripe on them
- Door panels are redesigned and are now a one piece design. GT models get a cloth or leather insert on the door panels.
- Cloth seats are redesigned and are given a unique "spider web" pattern
- GT models get the option of tan/saddle leather interior
- Cup holders are slightly redesigned
- GT models receive red center reflector with 'GT' logo between tail lights. License plate indent moved down onto bumper.
- GT decal on rear bumper replaced with metal '24v' badge
- Rear bumper is redesigned
- Exterior mirrors are redesigned
- Heated exterior mirrors option is dropped
- Graphic equalizer is dropped

=== 1996 ===
- "PROBE" badge stamped on rear windows is gone
- Door ding guards no longer are extended onto the fenders
- Base model dropped; SE is now the standard model
- Probe GT gets the 1995 base/SE's black outlined tail lights
- Illuminated exterior door locks are dropped
- Tan/saddle color interiors are now available in cloth
- Spoilers are redesigned
- Floor lighting is dropped
- "GT" center reflector above bumper on GT models is now outlined in black
- Probe GT gets more refined suspension to improve ride. Ride height is now higher and handling is different as a result.
- Cloth seats are redesigned again and get new fabric
- Probe GT now has spoilers standard
- Front seats are redesigned again
- Rear seats are redesigned
- Probe GT steering wheel's leather is no longer perforated
- New seat belts with automatic locking retractors
- Rear ashtray and map pocket on the passenger door of GT models are dropped
- Rear windshield wiper dropped as an option
- OBD-II ECU
- New colors
- New interior finishes.

=== 1997 ===
- SE model is dropped; base model returns and has the GT's front bumper
- Cloth/leather inserts on GT door panels are removed
- Base models get wheel covers from the Mazda 626, with 15-inch 3-spoke directional alloys from 95 and 96 Probe SE optional
- Or optional 16-inch 5-spoke directional rims "swirlies"
- Rear windshield wiper returns as an option
- ABS is no longer standard on GT models and is now an option
- GT logos behind the front wheel wells have new letter styling
- Probe GT no longer has "24v" badge beside the "PROBE" badge
- Side door intrusion beams redesigned to meet 1997 Federal Side Impact Standards
- GTS appearance package added to the GT's option list
- Last year for the Probe, with the last Probe being manufactured on June 20, 1997
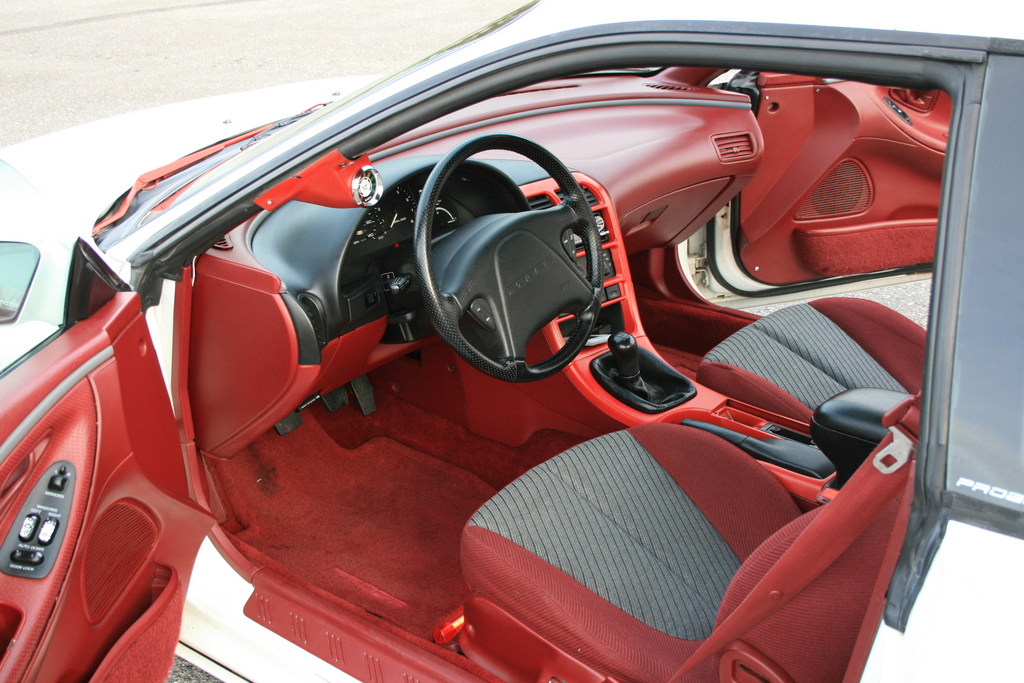
1993 Ford Probe GT with red interior

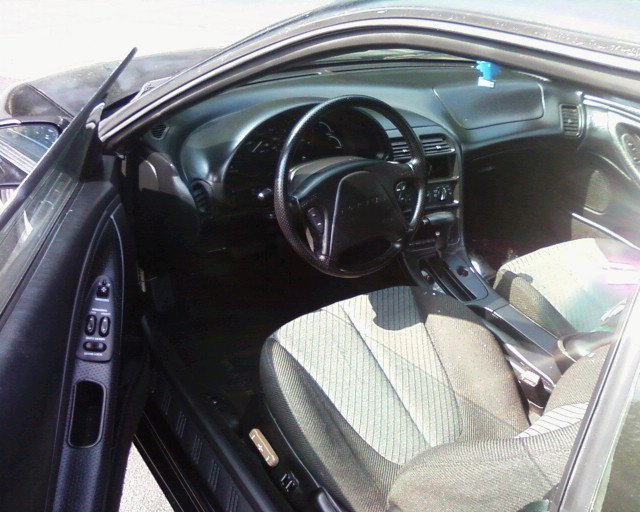
1994 Ford Probe GT with black interior

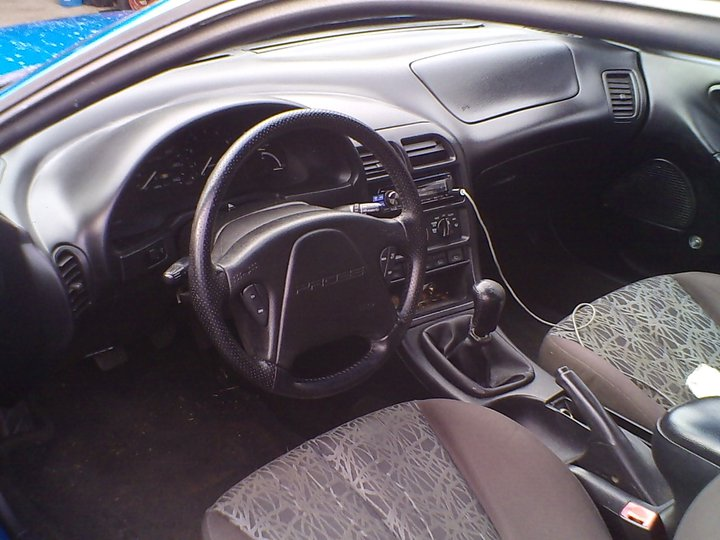
1995 Ford Probe GT with black interior

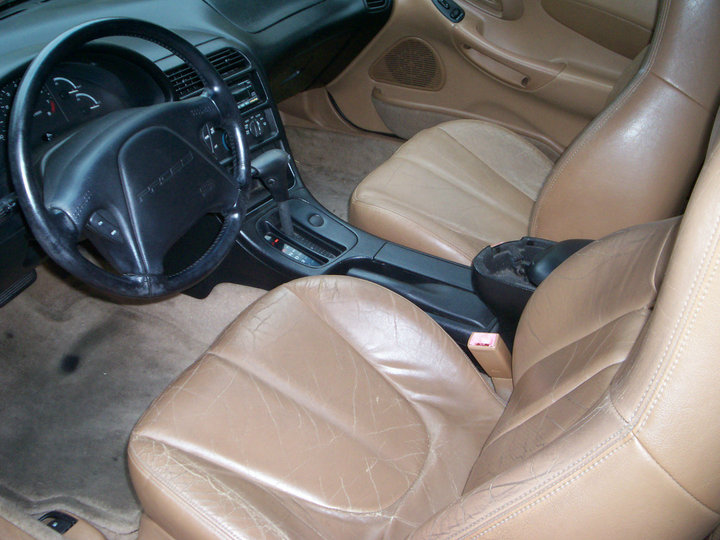
1996 Ford Probe GT with saddle leather interior

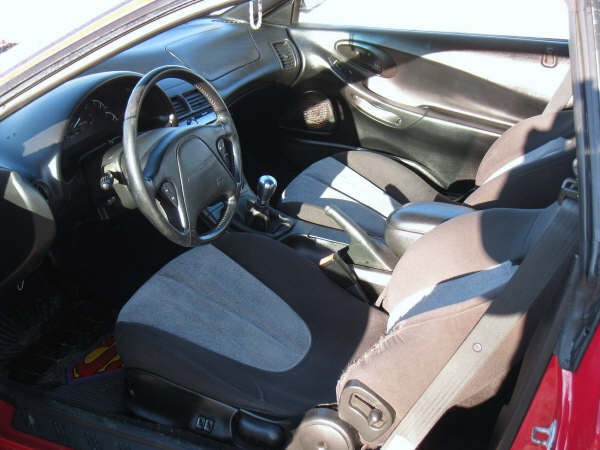
1997 Ford Probe GT with black interior

=== Production figures ===
Ford Probe Production Figures
	Yearly Total
1993	119,769
1994	85,505
1995	58,226
1996	30,125
1997	16,821
Total	310,446

== Proposed third generation ==
The last Probe was built on June 20, 1997. A third-generation model, using the same platform as the Ford Contour, was under development intended for release in mid-1998 as a 1999 model. When Ford decided to discontinue the Probe, this new design became the next-generation Mercury Cougar, launched in June 1998 as a 1999 model. The name change was intended to attract younger buyers into Mercury showrooms, but this proved unsuccessful.

== Awards ==
The Probe GT was Motor Trend magazine's Car of the Year for 1993. It also made Car and Driver magazine's Ten Best list for 1989, 1993, and 1994.

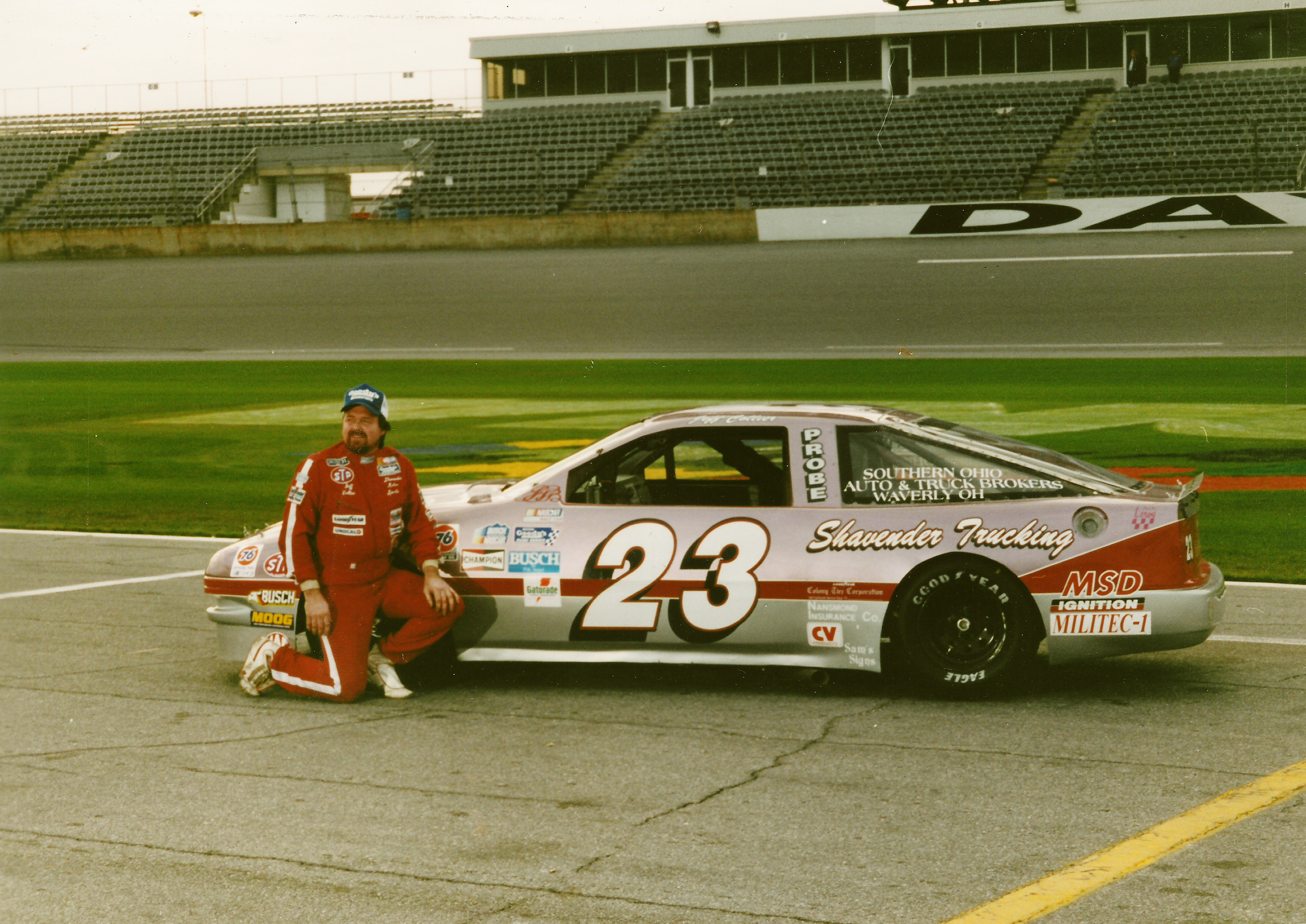
Jeffrey Collier with NASCAR Dash Series Ford Probe in February 1990

The NASCAR Dash Series version of a 1990 Ford Probe driven by Jeffrey Collier set a new track record at Daytona International Speedway on February 13, 1990, with a speed of 166.553 mph (268.041 km/h). That record still stands as the fastest closed course lap for a non-turbo four-cylinder powered car.
