= John Coletti =

Oscar John Coletti is an American automobile engineer. He worked for the American automaker Ford Motor Company in the company's performance division, and later was the COO and president of EcoMotors International until his retirement on March 15, 2013.

He was responsible, as director of that company's Special Vehicle Team (SVT) group, for a number of special performance cars in the 1990s and 2000s, including the Ford Focus SVT, SVT Contour, Ford F-150 Lightning and the Ford Mustang Cobra. He later spearheaded development and production of the Ford GT supercar.

Since retirement, he has been the managing director of Automotive Performance Partners.

Production vehicles programs under Coletti's leadership include:

1991 Mustang Feature Car
1992 Mustang Feature Car Yellow w/Chrome Wheels
1992 Mustang Feature Car Monochromatic White
1992 Tempo V6
1994 SN95 Mustang
1994 Mustang Indy Pace Car
1995 Mustang Cobra R "351W"
1998 SVT Contour
1999 F150 SVT Lightning
2000 Mustang Cobra R "5.4L-4V"
2002 Focus ST170 (European Market)
2002 SVT Focus "Piranha"
2003 SVT Cobra "Terminator"
2004 Ford GT "Petunia"

Concept vehicle programs that were developed, but never saw production, include:

1993 Mach III Mustang
1994 BOSS 10L Mustang
1995 Ford GT90
1995 Mustang CJ-R
1996 Contour "Profile"
1996 Taurus SHO Station Wagon "Gumby"
1996 SVT Thunderbird
1997 Mustang Super Stallion
1998 Escort CT120 Turbo
1998 Ranger "Lightning Bolt"
1998 Supercharged Thunderbird
2000 SVE Ford Focus "Irene"
2005 SVT Lightning "Tomcat"
2006 SVT T/C Focus "Panama"
2006 SVT Mustang Cobra "Condor"

He is also credited with saving the rear wheel drive Mustang in the early 1990s, when it was to be eliminated for cost reasons. Coletti retired from SVT in 2004. He and his wife Judy are the parents of four children.

== Bibliography ==
- Paul Ingrassia & Joseph B. White, COMEBACK, The Fall & Rise of the American Automobile Industry, chapter 16 "The Mustang", 1994. ISBN 0-671-79214-8, ISBN 0-684-80437-9
- Bob McClurg, Mustang, The Next Generation, chapters 6 - 11. 1994, ISBN 0-9640895-0-5
- Donald Farr, Mustang Fifty Years, pp 122, 124-129, 138-139, 221-222. 2013, ISBN 0760343969
- Joseph Juran & A. Blanton Godfrey, Juran's Quality Handbook, 5th edition, chapter 3, "The Quality Planning Process". 1998
- Russ Banham, The Ford Century: Ford Motor Company and the Innovations that Shaped the World, p 229. 2002 ISBN 1-931688-03-6
- Jim Campisano, Powered by SVT, Celebrating a Decade of Ford Performance, pp 5, 14-16, 22-24, 43, 49-50, 64-68, 71-99, 106-117, 126-144. 2003 ISBN 0-7607-4219-7
- Larry Edsall, Ford GT, The Legend Comes to Life, pp 69, 70, 72, 76, 112-114. 2004 ISBN 0-7603-1993-6
- Frank Moriarty, Lead Foot, Iron Fist. 2006, ISBN 978-0-595-40970-9
- John Clor, The Mustang Dynasty, Chapter 7, "1994-2004". 2007, ISBN 1-932855-80-7
