= Ford Cougar =

Compact car developed and produced by Ford of Europe

Ford Cougar (Europe)
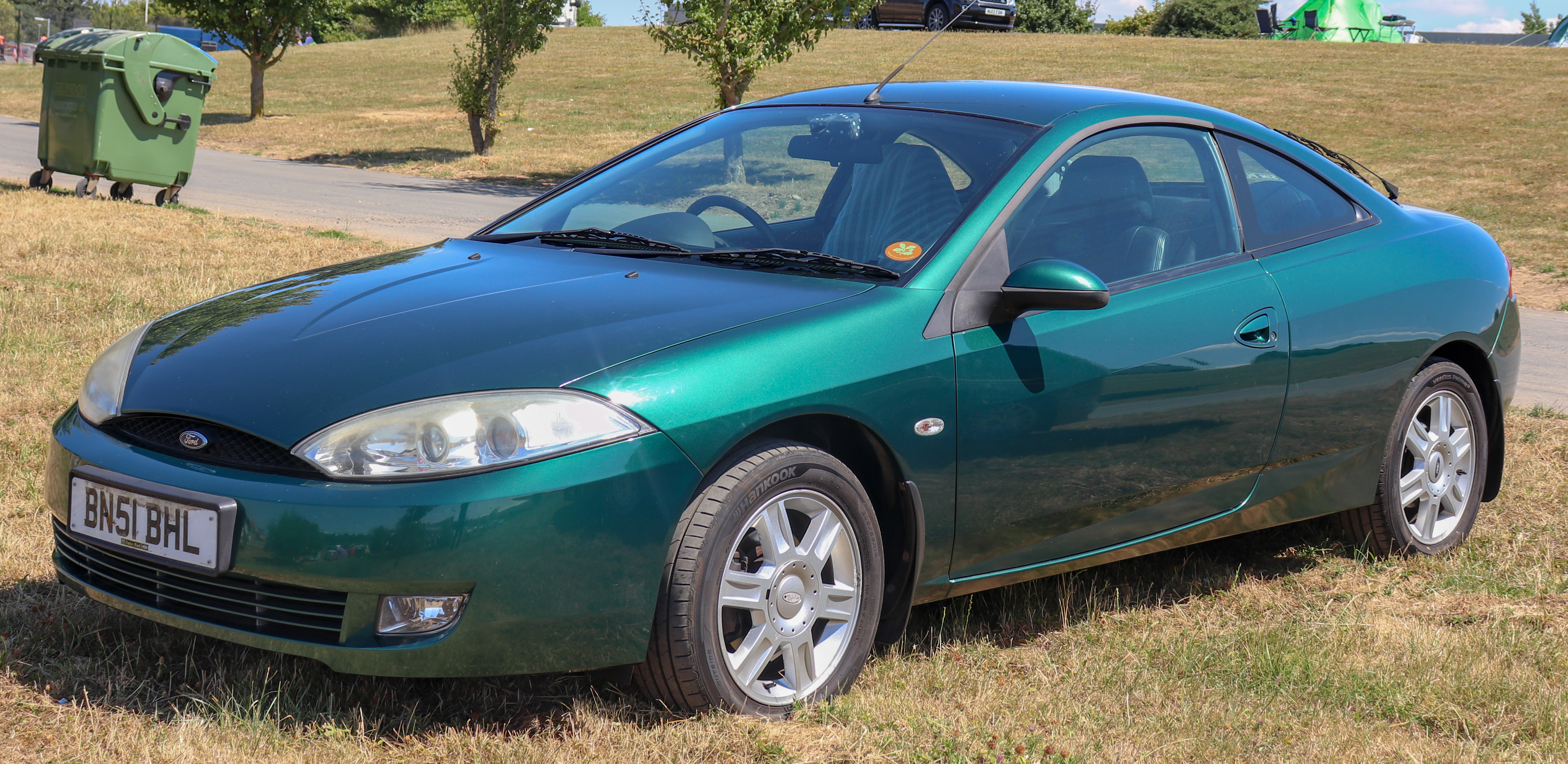

Overview
- Manufacturer: Ford Europe
- Also called: Mercury Cougar (United States)
- Production: 1998–2002; 1998–2001 (Britain)
- Model years: 1999-2002
- Assembly: Flat Rock, Michigan, United States; Köln, Germany
- Designer: Darrell Behmer

Body and chassis
- Class: Large family car (D)
- Body style: 3-door liftback coupé
- Layout: Front engine, front-wheel-drive
- Related: Ford Mondeo; Mercury Cougar

Powertrain
- Engine: 2.0 L Zetec I4; 2.5 L Duratec V6
- Transmission: 5-speed manual 4-speed automatic

Dimensions
- Wheelbase: 2,704 mm (106.5 in)
- Length: 4,699 mm (185.0 in)
- Width: 1,769 mm (69.6 in)
- Height: 1,308 mm (51.5 in)

Chronology
- Predecessor: Ford Probe

The Ford Cougar is a D-segment coupé that was produced and sold in the European market between 1998 and 2002, and sold in Canada and the United States from 1999 until 2002 as the Mercury Cougar.

The car was originally intended to be the third generation Probe. However, after rationalisation of the three coupés available in the United States, the Probe name was dropped in favour of the Cougar. It is an example of a sports coupé/liftback.

== History ==
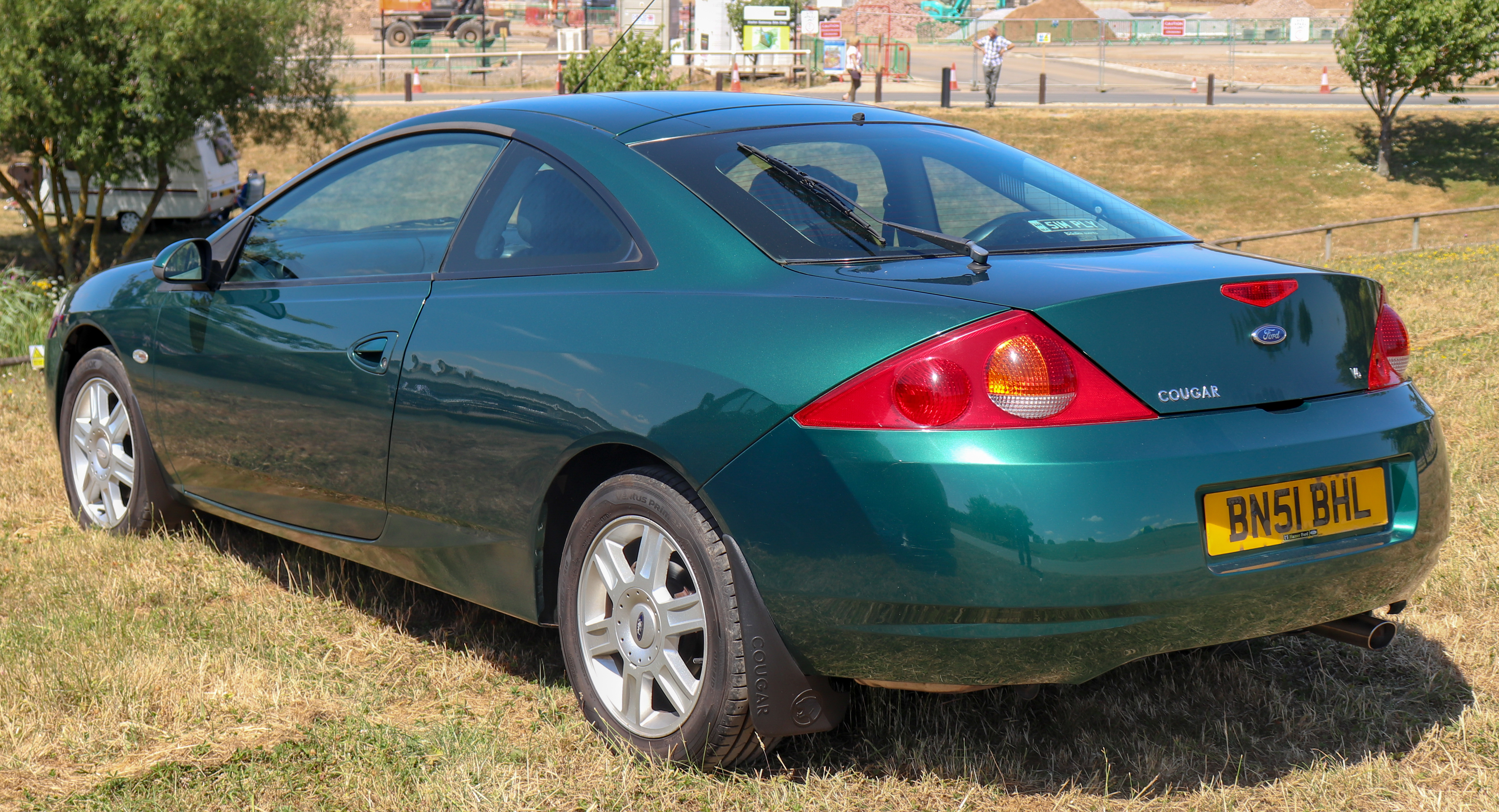
Ford Cougar - rear view

The Cougar was Ford's second attempt to reintroduce a sports coupé in Europe, in the same vein as the successful, but long-discontinued Capri – the first attempt having been the Mazda MX-6-based Probe. Just as the Capri had been based on the Cortina, the Cougar was based on the large family car available at the time, the Mondeo.

The car went on sale in Europe in December 1998 to mixed reviews, partly due to the then-new and controversial New Edge styling, a crisp style which was subsequently applied to most of the Ford range. Cougar sales levels did not achieve those of predecessor Capri models.

Like its (indirect) predecessor, the Ford Probe, the 1998 Cougar was sold and built in the United States. Cars destined to be sold in Europe and the United Kingdom were finished in Ford's Köln plant in Germany, where the cars had European specification lighting installed, Ford badges applied (and in the case of the United Kingdom and Australian cars, converted to RHD); in the United States, it had different branding, in this case being branded as the Mercury Cougar, while in Europe and Australia, it was known as the Ford Cougar.

In Britain, Ford unveiled the car in July 1998 at the British Grand Prix at Silverstone. The television advertisements featured the silver model, driven by Dennis Hopper, due to his appearance in the film Easy Rider. At the same time, Steppenwolf's song from 1968, "Born To Be Wild" played, as it was featured in the film, and in the same scene, the advertisement was recreated.

The Cougar was retired from the European market in August 2002, after its withdrawal from Britain, in February 2001. After the first two years of production, only 12,000 units reportedly had been sold in the United Kingdom. Released in Australia in October 1999, the Cougar only came with the 2.5 L 24-valve Duratec V6, and sales continued until March 2004.

== Technical ==
=== Mechanical ===
The Cougar was built on the Ford Mondeo sedan platform, providing it with a good ride and, compared to other coupes, along with "reasonably generous" interior room.

The Cougar came equipped with the 2.0 L 16-valve Zetec, or the 2.5 L 24-valve Duratec V6 engines with two specification levels, largely equivalent to a Mondeo Ghia (standard) and Ghia X (simply X). Manual and automatic transmissions were available. All variants came with 16-inch alloy wheels as standard.

The standard 2.0 L version was rated at 96 kW (131 hp) while the 2.5 L was rated at 125 kW (170 hp).

== Specifications ==
	2.0 L 16v	2.5 L 24v	2.5 L 24v (automatic)
Engine	Zetec, EDBA	Duratec	
Cylinders/Valves	R4/16	V6/24	
Displacement	1988 cc	2544 cc (2495 cc from June 2000)	
Max. power	96 kW (129 hp) @ 5600 rpm	125 kW (168 hp) @ 6250 rpm	
Max torque	178 N⋅m (131 lbf⋅ft) @ 4000 rpm	220 N⋅m (162 lbf⋅ft) @ 4250 rpm	
Drive	Front wheel drive		
0–100 km/h (0-62 mph)	10.3 s	8.6 s	10.4 s
Top speed	209 km/h (130 mph)	225 km/h (140 mph)	206 km/h (128 mph)
Weight EU norm	1,315 kg (2,899 lb)	1,390 kg (3,064 lb)	1,410 kg (3,109 lb)
CO_{2} Emissions	202 g/km	228 g/km	240 g/km
Years	1998–2002	1998–2002	1998–2002

=== Handling ===
The car's handling has been described as "puts its power down effectively and tackles twisty roads with confidence." The standard wheels had 215 mm wide tyres, which contributed to its cornering abilities. However, long trips by Car and Driver resulted in numerous "uncomplimentary observations concerning the driver's seat."

=== Extras ===
An "X-Pack" was available on the larger engine; this included leather upholstered and heated front seats, with six-way electric adjustment for the driver's seat, and a Ford RDS6000 six-speaker radio with six-CD autochanger.

Available at an extra cost, and not included in the "X-Pack" were heated windscreen, electric tilt, slide sunroof, and metallic paint.

=== Safety and security ===
The standard safety features included driver, passenger, and side airbags, plus anti-lock brakes and seat belts that reduce chest injuries. The Cougar included an engine immobiliser, remote control central and double locking systems, and an alarm.

== See also ==
- Mercury Cougar
