= Jeffrey Collier =

American race car driver

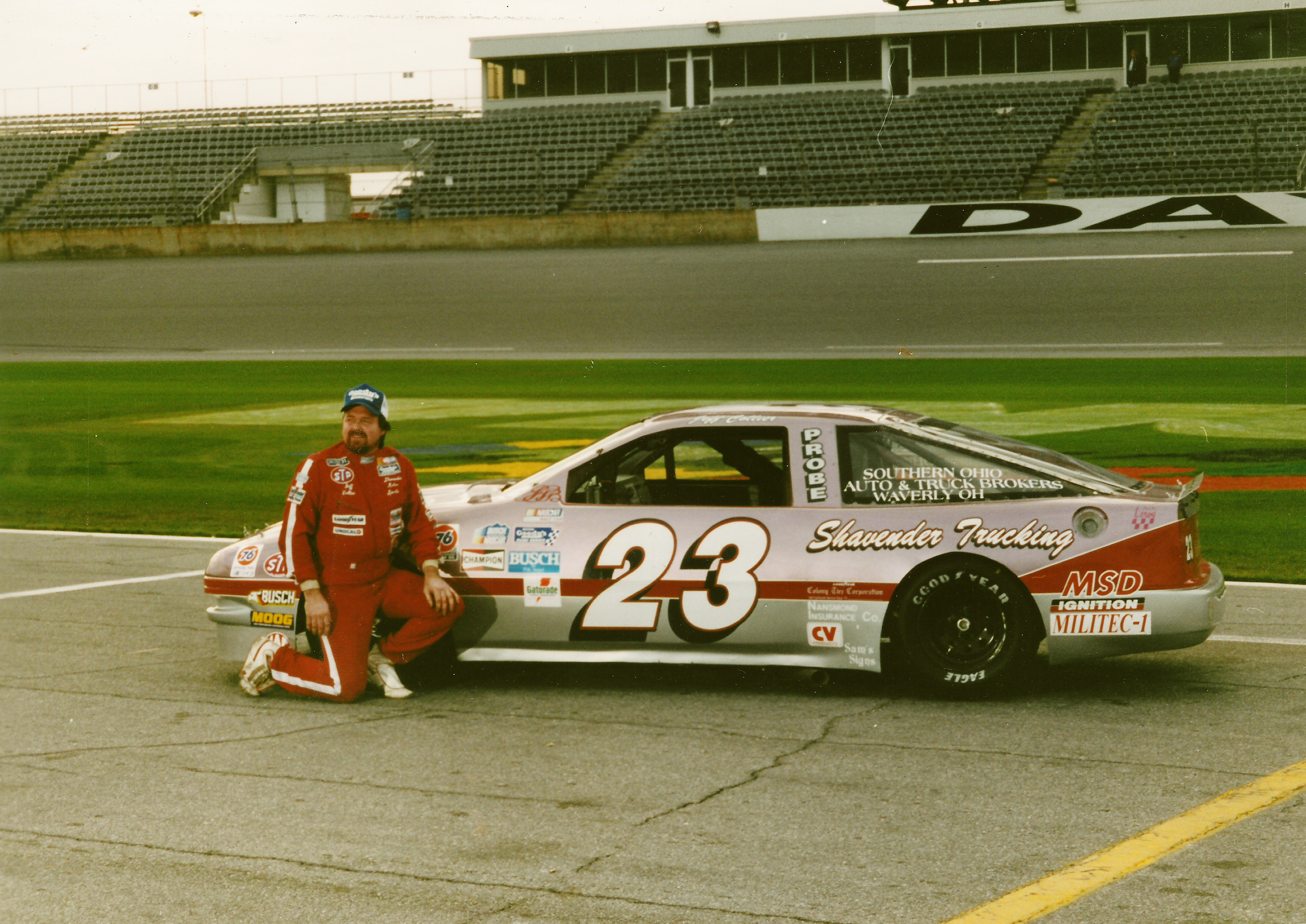
- Collier next to his 1990 Ford Probe Dash Series car
- Nationality: American
- Born: Jeffrey Clayton Collier; October 5, 1954
- Died: June 28, 2021 (aged 66) Murfreesboro, North Carolina, U.S.

NASCAR Dash Series

Jeffrey Clayton Collier (October 5, 1954 – June 28, 2021) was an American race car driver. He drove in the NASCAR Dash Series from 1988 to 1994. On February 13, 1990, Collier sat on pole for the Florida 200 at Daytona International Speedway with a new track record of 166.553 mph. Collier was driving a 1990 Ford Probe. This record is a World Closed Course Speed Record for non turbo 4-cylinder powered race cars.

NASCAR ended the Dash Series in January, 2003 and the 1990 track record by Collier remains the fastest qualifying lap officially recorded for a NASCAR sanctioned event at any track for this Series. Unofficially, the Ford Probe driven by Collier was clocked at a private test session conducted by Ford Motor Company at Talladega International Speedway in January, 1992 at an average lap speed of 174.225 mph.

The record setting car was on display in the International Motorsports Museum in Talladega, Alabama for one year in 1991. It was removed from the museum collection by its owner, Buddy Shavender of Pantego, NC, put in race trim and with Collier at the wheel, again sat on pole at Daytona in 1992 for the Florida 200. After two Daytona poles, a NASCAR Dash Series record and a World record, the Ford Probe driven by Collier was retired from competition. The car is now housed in a private museum in Pantego, North Carolina.

Collier was killed in a car accident in Murfreesboro, NC on June 28, 2021.
