= EcoMotors =

EcoMotors was an American company developing and commercializing an opposed-piston opposed-cylinder (OPOC) engine for use in cars, light trucks, commercial vehicles, aerospace, marine, agriculture, auxiliary power units, generators, etc. This engine was promoted to significantly improve fuel efficiency, and substantially reduce production costs when compared to conventional internal combustion engines.

EcoMotors was founded in 2008. Its headquarters were in Allen Park, Michigan.

As of 2013, the principal officers of EcoMotors were: Prof. Peter Hofbauer (chairman, chief technology officer and inventor of the OPOC engine), Donald Runkle (chief executive officer) and Amit Soman (president and chief operating officer).

The two primary investors in EcoMotors were Khosla Ventures and Bill Gates. Vinod Khosla, who founded Khosla Ventures in 2004, was a co-founder and CEO of Sun Microsystems and formerly a general partner at Kleiner Perkins.

In April 2013 EcoMotors announced a deal to have Chinese auto parts giant Zhongding Power build a $200 million factory in the Anhui Province in eastern China. The factory hoped to produce 150,000 OPOC engines per year, with a further site reserved to take production to 400,000. The engine blocks would be made of CGI (compacted graphite iron) and would be produced at a fully automated Zhongding foundry in Anhui by a license from Sintercast of Sweden. The production was first announced to commence in 2014 but delayed to 2016.

As of February 2017 the EcoMotors web site was defunct. It's intellectual property was put up for sale with closing date in Sept. 2017.

== OPOC engine ==
OPOC engine (labels in German)

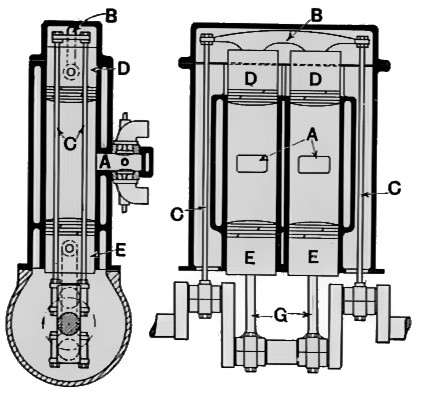
Gobron-Brillié opposed-piston engine from 1900, which the OPOC engine's basic design emulates.

The OPOC engine is a two-stroke reciprocating internal combustion engine in which each cylinder has a piston at both ends, and no cylinder head or mechanical valvetrain. The opposed cylinder design has two cylinders, one on each side of the crankshaft, each with two pistons, for mechanical balance.

The first opposed piston engine produced was by the French company Gobron-Brillié in 1900. The engine had one crankshaft and is very similar in concept to the EcoMotors OPOC engine design, except using a camshaft and valves, and not in opposed-cylinder configuration.

The OPOC engine can be moduled with two, or more, engines coupled via an electric clutch between engines. When more power is needed the second engine is clutched in. When clutched out of service there are no friction or pumping losses from the second engine module. This arrangement in city running vehicles could have a small, highly economical engine as the prime engine and when accelerating hard, or pulling heavy loads, the second, or more, engines are clutched into service.
