= Mazda2 =

Japanese subcompact car

- 2021 Mazda2 GT Sport

Overview
- Manufacturer: Mazda
- Also called: Mazda Demio (Japan, 2002–2019)
- Production: 2002–present

Body and chassis
- Class: Subcompact car/Supermini (B)
- Layout: Front-engine, front-wheel-drive or all-wheel-drive

Chronology
- Predecessor: Mazda 121 (DW)

The Mazda 2 (Japanese: マツダ・ツー, Hepburn: Matsuda Tsū) is a subcompact/supermini (B-segment) car, which has been available as a 4-door sedan and a 5 door hatchback manufactured and marketed by Mazda since 2002, currently in its third generation. An entry-level model of the brand in markets outside Japan, the Mazda2 is positioned below the Mazda3. The Mazda2 has also been marketed as the Mazda Demio (a name it kept in the Japanese market until 2019), while its direct predecessor was exported as the Mazda 121.

The second-generation Mazda2 earned the 2008 World Car of the Year title, while the third-generation model was awarded the 2014–2015 Japanese Car of the Year.

The third-generation model was sold in North America as the Scion iA and Toyota Yaris, Yaris iA and Yaris R.

A separate, gasoline-hybrid version based on the Toyota Yaris Hybrid has been sold in Europe under the same Mazda2 nameplate since 2022 alongside the gasoline-powered third-generation Mazda2.

== First generation (DY; 2002) ==
First generation
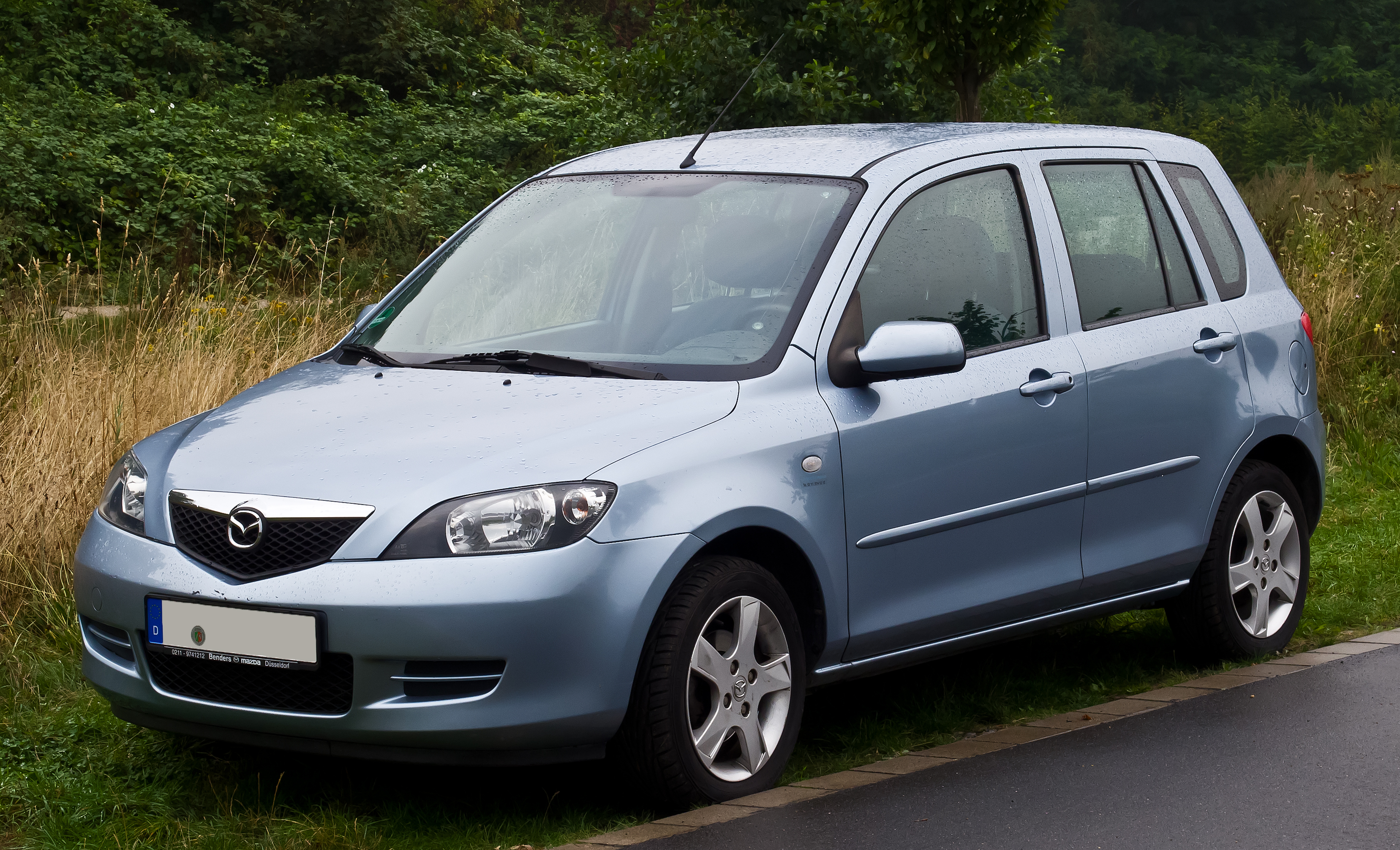
- 2002–2004 Mazda2 (DY; pre-facelift, Germany)

Overview
- Model code: DY
- Also called: Mazda Demio
- Production: 2002–2007
- Assembly: Japan: Hiroshima (Hiroshima (Mazda factory)); Spain: Almussafes (Ford Valencia Plant)

Body and chassis
- Body style: 5-door hatchback
- Related: Mazda Verisa; Ford Fiesta (fifth generation); Ford Fusion (JU)

Powertrain
- Engine: Gasoline: 1.3 L ZJ-VE I4; 1.5 L ZY-VE I4; 1.25 L MZI C2 I4; 1.4 L MZI C4 I4; 1.6 L MZI C6 I4; Diesel: 1.4 L MZ-CDTi I4
- Transmission: 5-speed manual; 4-speed automatic

Dimensions
- Wheelbase: 2,490 mm (98.0 in)
- Length: 3,925 mm (154.5 in)
- Width: 1,680 mm (66.1 in)
- Height: 1,530 mm (60.2 in)
- Curb weight: 1,080 kg (2,381 lb)

Mazda developed the model from the B-segment Ford B3 platform, which is shared with the fifth-generation Ford Fiesta along with components such as suspension design. The development of the model was led by chief engineer Kiyoshi Fujiwara, which also oversaw the development of the B3 platform at Ford's European R&D. Production of the car for European market was consigned to the Almussafes Ford plant in Valencia, Spain since 20 January 2003.

All models are equipped with ABS and EBD, and stability control was optional. An innovative feature offered in Japan is e-4WD, a hybrid car-type system which uses an electric motor to power the rear wheels of this front wheel drive vehicle when needed. In the Demio, this system is used only as a traction aid, not for increased fuel economy as in most other vehicles.

There is also a big difference in floor pan and pedal box. The European-exclusive version of Mazda2 (DY) uses a pedal box directly sourced from Ford Fiesta, with their own 4x108 bolt pattern instead of 4x100.

Three trim levels were available in Japan, which are Cozy, Sport and Casual.

In Europe, trim levels were S, TS and TS2. The TS and TS2 were renamed Antares and Capella in 2004. The Japanese 1.3 and 1.5 gasoline engines are not available, but Ford's 1.25-liter 16-valve Sigma engine is used, and Mazda's 1.4 and 1.6 gasoline, plus Fords 1.4 TDCi diesel are offered but called 1.4 CDTi by Mazda.

In New Zealand, the Mazda2 was sold with a 1.5 ZY-VE straight-four engine.

In 2004, Mazda introduced the Verisa in Japan. The Verisa is based on the Demio/Mazda2 but was targeted further upmarket.

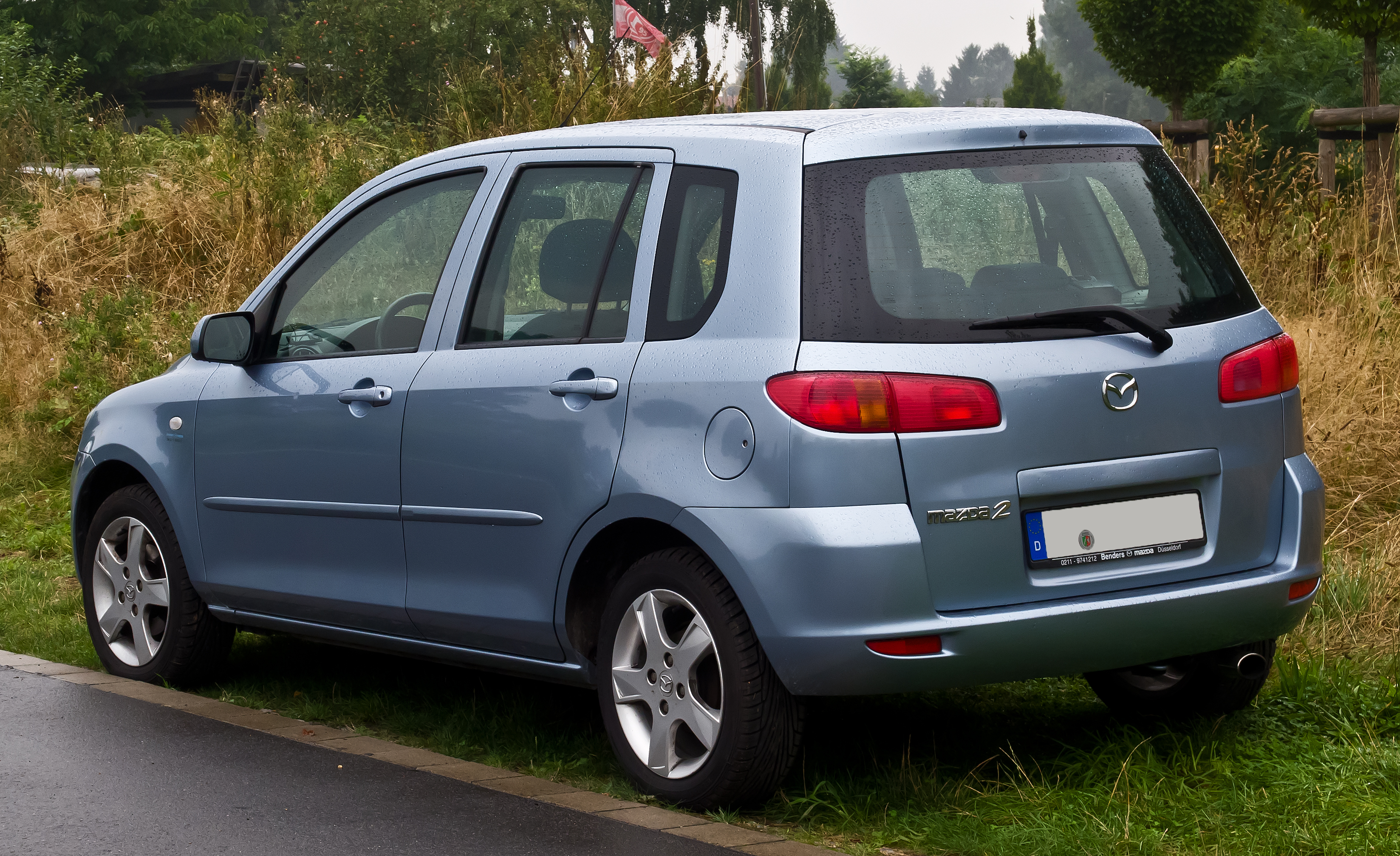
2002–2004 Mazda2 (DY; pre-facelift, Germany)

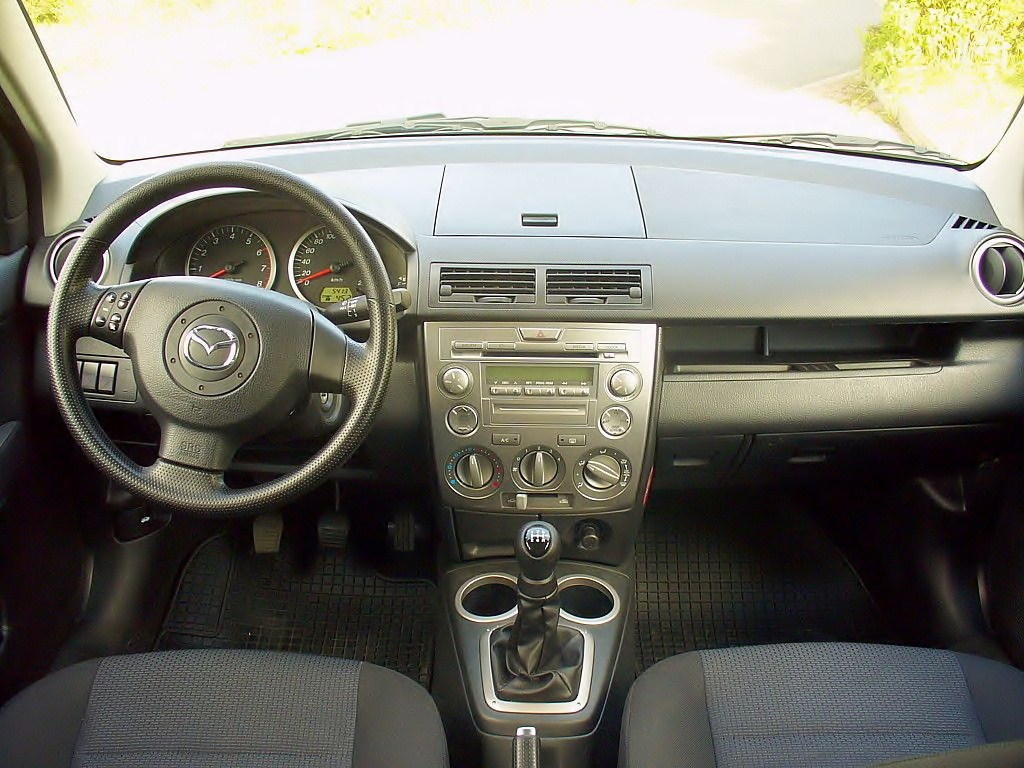
Interior

=== Engines ===
The Mazda2 is sold with a variety of Z-family engines:

Mazda Demio

Engines
Engine	Power at rpm	Torque at rpm
1.3 L ZJ-VE I4	91 PS (67 kW; 90 hp) at 6000	124 N⋅m; 91 lb⋅ft (12.6 kg⋅m) at 3500
1.5 L ZY-VE I4	113 PS (83 kW; 111 hp) at 6000	140 N⋅m; 103 lb⋅ft (14.3 kg⋅m) at 4000

Mazda2

Engines
Engine	Power at rpm	Torque at rpm
Gasoline
1.25 L MZI I4 C2	70 PS (51 kW; 69 hp) at 5700,	110 N⋅m (81 lbf⋅ft) at 3500
1.4 L MZI I4 C4	80 PS (59 kW; 79 hp) at 5700	124 N⋅m (91 lbf⋅ft) at 3500
1.5 L ZY-VE I4	113 PS (83 kW; 111 hp) at 6000	14.3 kg⋅m (140 N⋅m; 103 lb⋅ft) at 4000
1.6 L MZI I4 C6	100 PS (74 kW; 99 hp) at 6000	146 N⋅m (108 lbf⋅ft) at 4000
Diesel
1.4 L MZ-CDTi I4	68 PS (50 kW; 67 hp) at 4000	160 N⋅m (120 lbf⋅ft) at 2000

=== 2005 facelift ===
The Demio received its facelift on 13 April 2005.

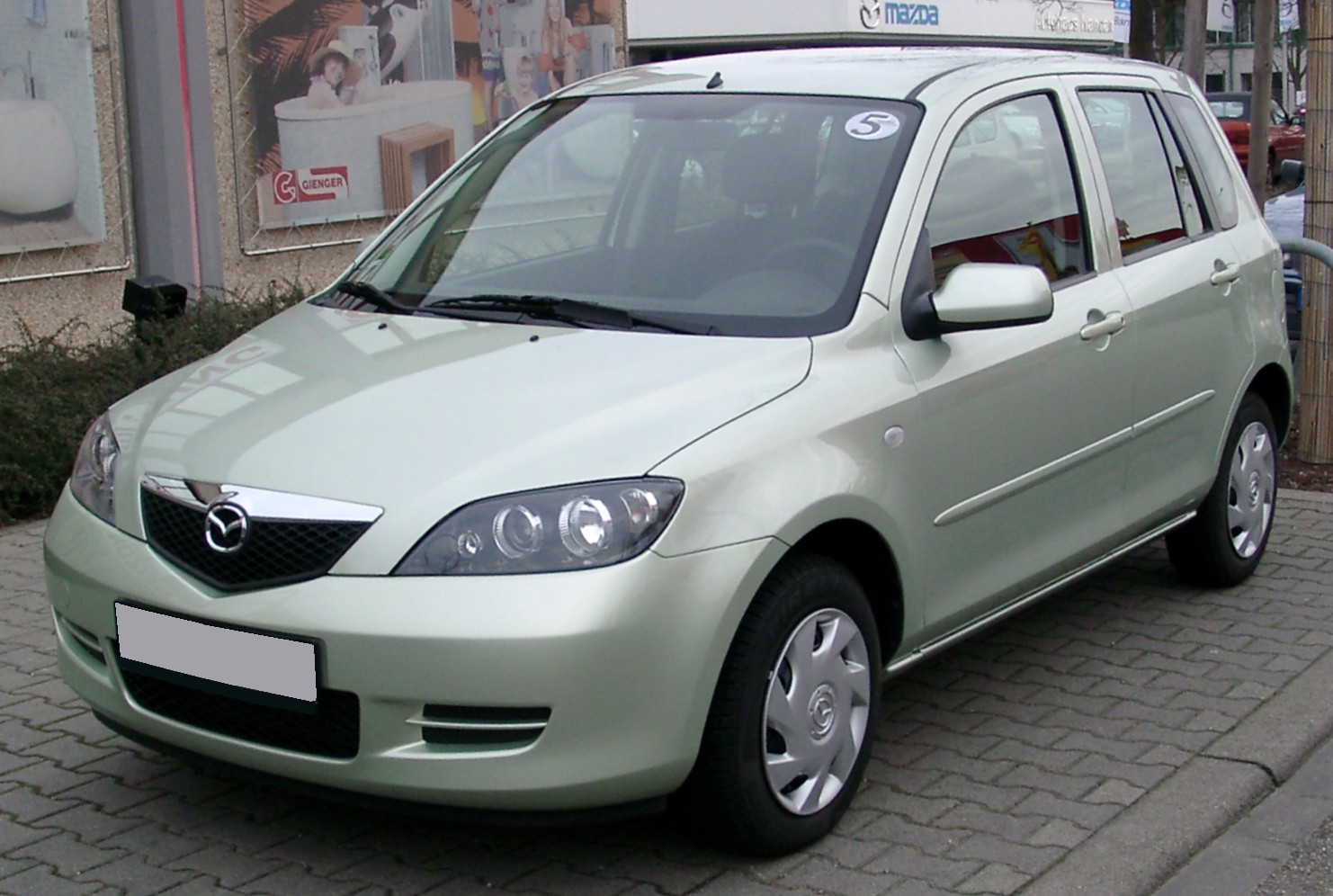
Mazda2 (facelift, Germany, 2005–2007)

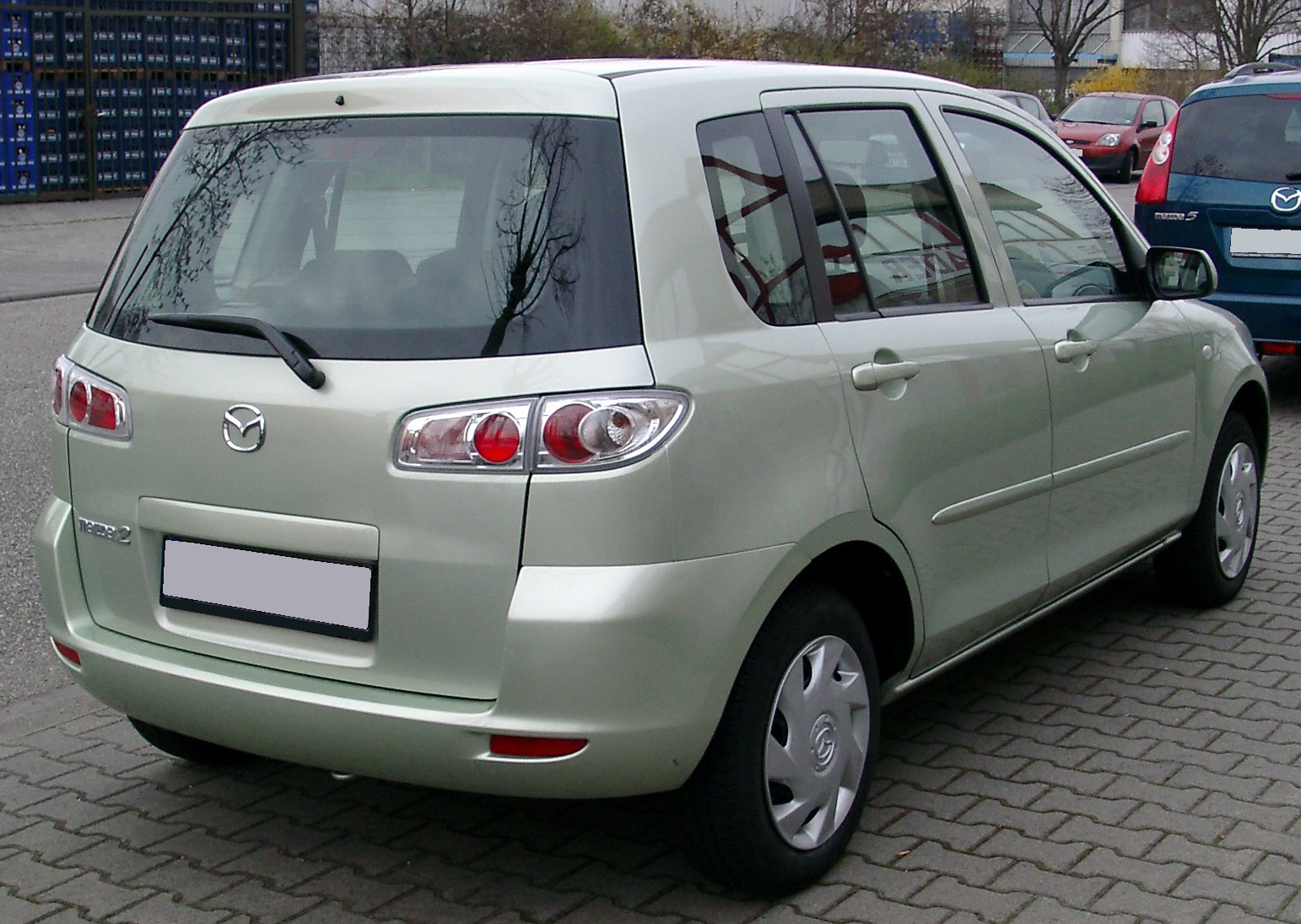
Mazda2 (facelift, Germany, 2005–2007)

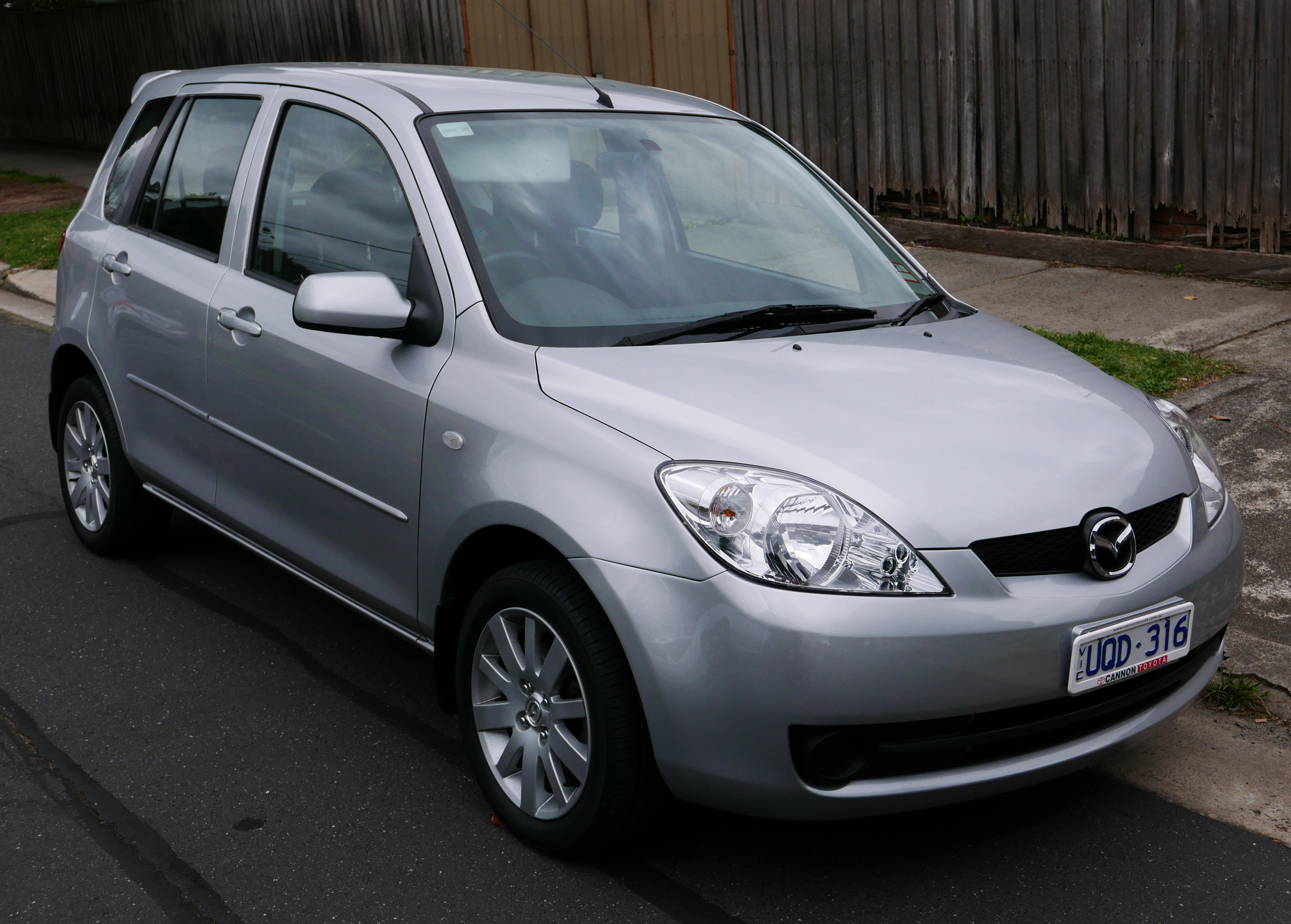
Mazda2 Maxx (facelift, Australia, 2005–2007)

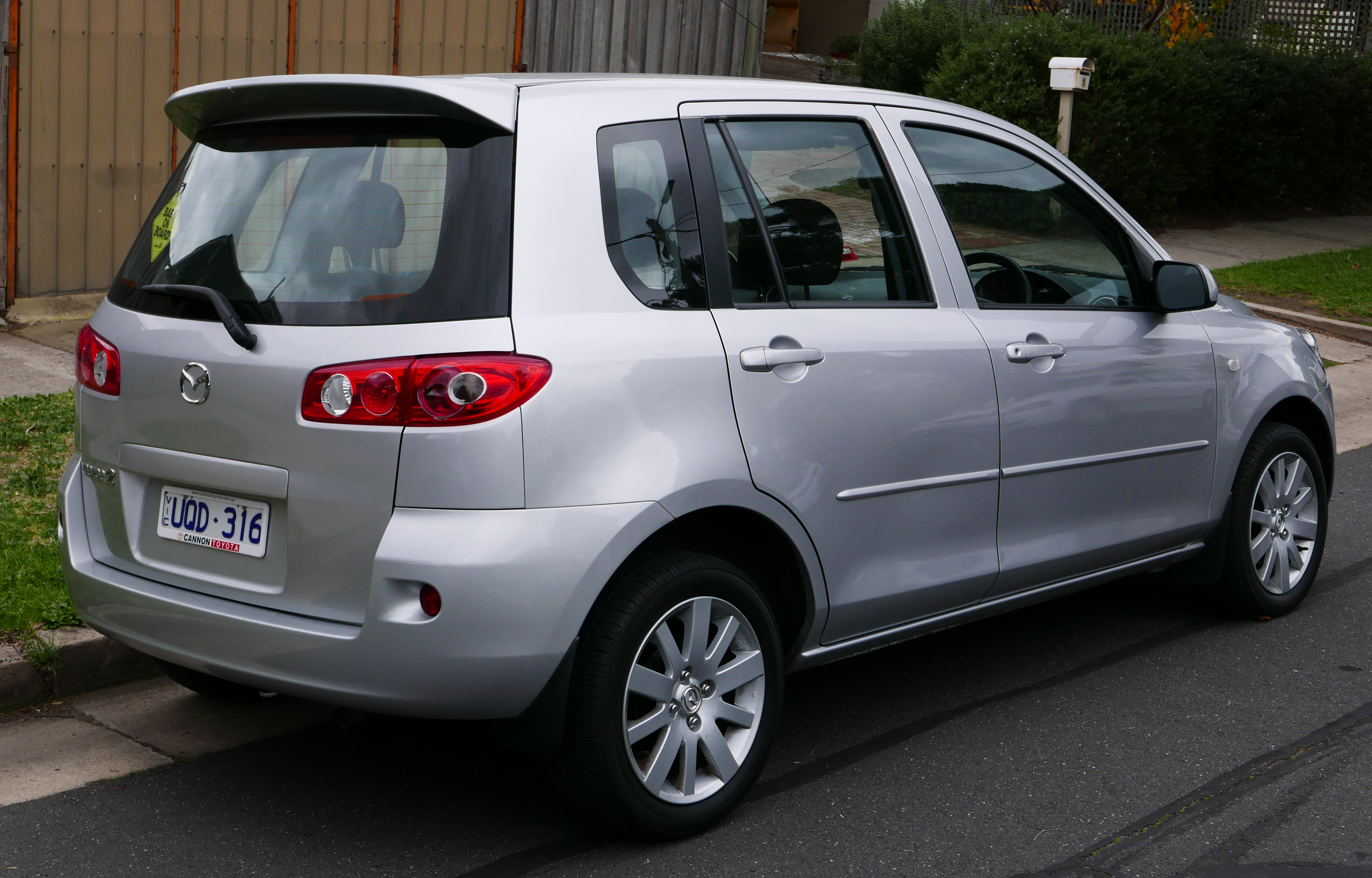
Mazda2 Maxx (facelift, Australia, 2005–2007)

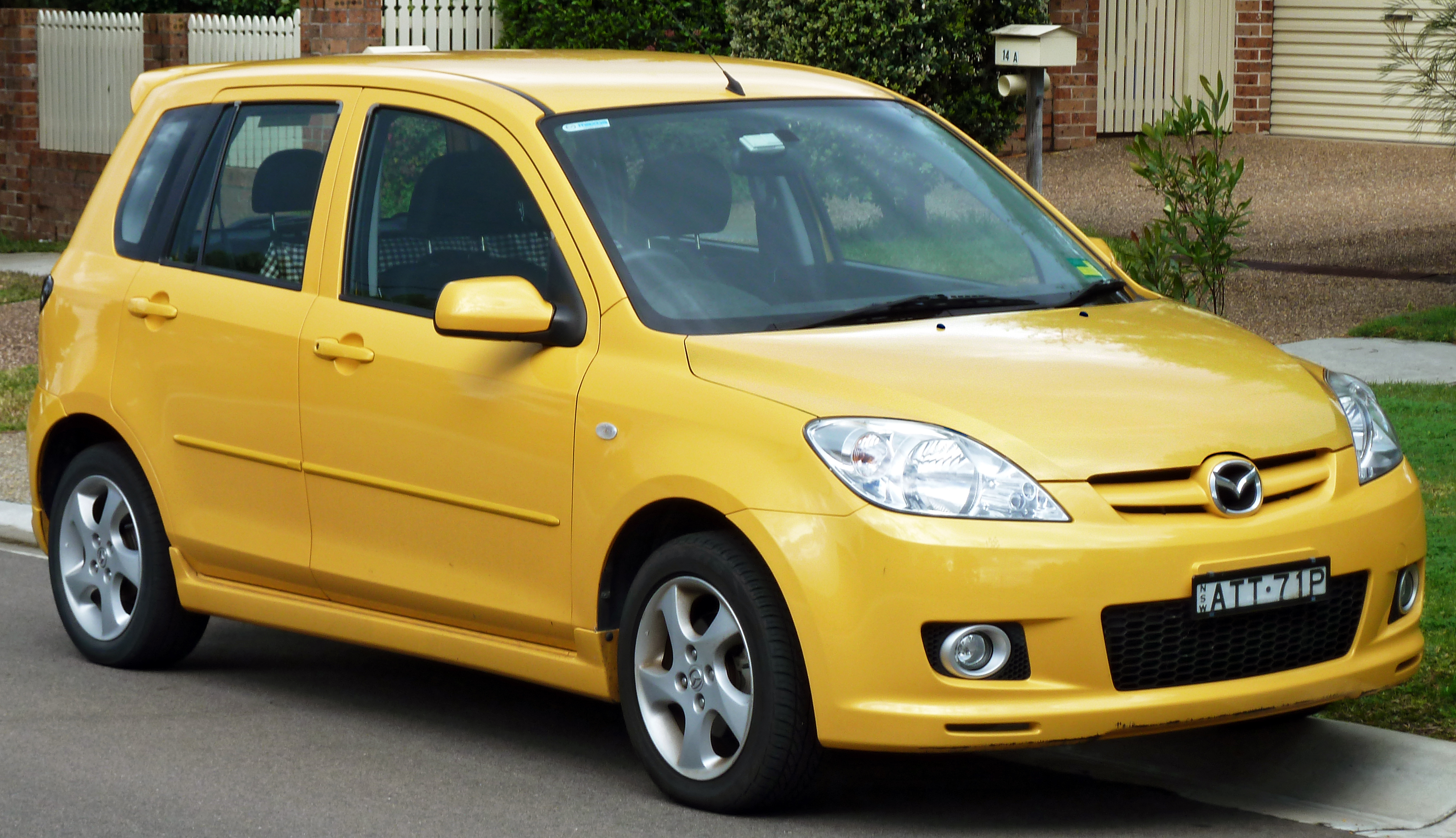
Mazda2 Genki (facelift, Australia)

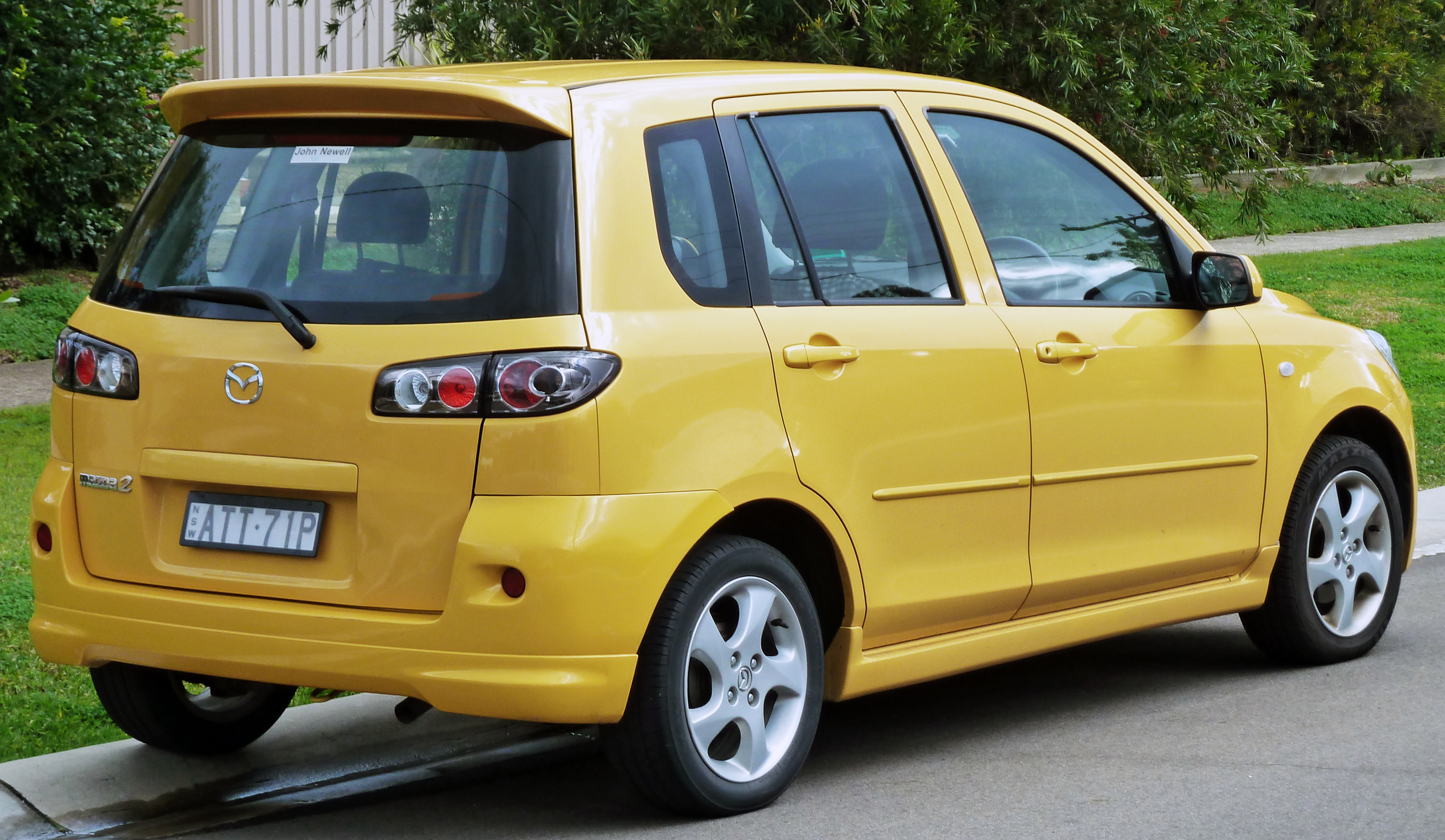
Mazda2 Genki (facelift)

=== Safety ===
Euro NCAP test results* Mazda2 (2003)
Test	Score	Rating
Adult occupant:	25	4 /5 stars
Child occupant:	25	3 /5 stars
Pedestrian:	10	2 /4 stars

ANCAP test results* Mazda 2 (2003)
Test	Score
Overall	4 /5 stars
Frontal offset	11.33/16
Side impact	14.05/16
Pole	Not Assessed
Seat belt reminders	0/3
Whiplash protection	Not Assessed
Pedestrian protection	Marginal
Electronic stability control	Not Assessed

== Second generation (DE/DH; 2007) ==
Second generation
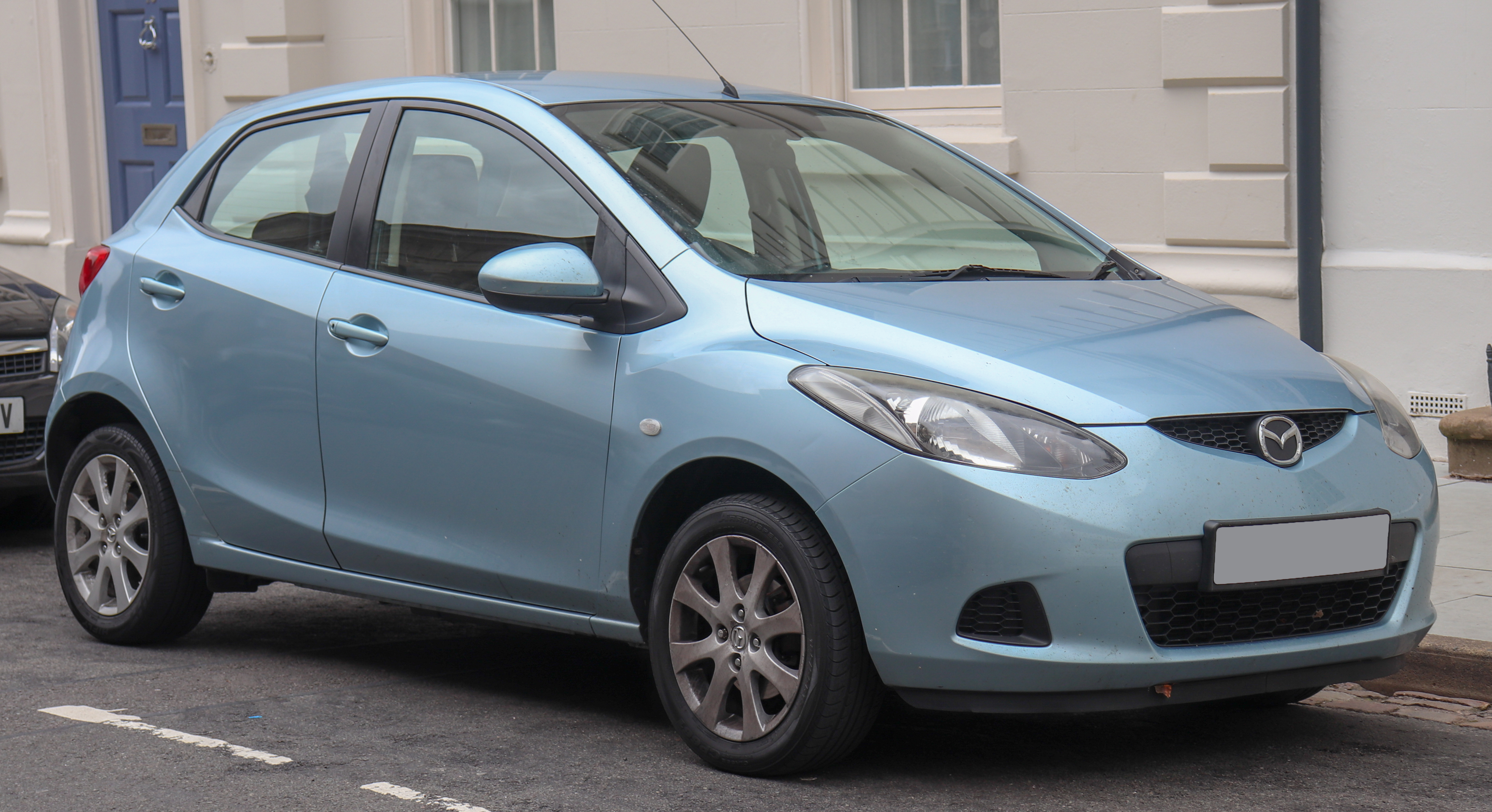
- 5-door (pre-facelift, UK)

Overview
- Model code: DE (hatchback); DH (sedan)
- Also called: Mazda Demio
- Production: May 2007 – November 2014
- Assembly: Japan: Hiroshima (Hiroshima (Mazda factory)); China: Nanjing / Hainan (Changan Ford Mazda); Thailand: Rayong (AutoAlliance Thailand); Colombia: Bogotá (Compañía Colombiana Automotriz); Iran: Tehran (Bahman Group); Vietnam: Nui Thanh District, Quang Nam (Truong Hai Auto Corporation)
- Designer: Ikuo Maeda

Body and chassis
- Body style: 3- and 5-door hatchback; 4-door sedan
- Related: Ford Fiesta (sixth generation)

Powertrain
- Engine: Gasoline: 1.3 L ZJ-VE I4; 1.3 L Skyactiv-G P3-VPS I4; 1.5 L ZY-VE I4; Diesel: 1.4 L Y4 I4; 1.6 L Y6 I4
- Transmission: 5-speed manual; 4-speed 4F27E automatic; CVT

Dimensions
- Wheelbase: 2,490–2,492 mm (98.0–98.1 in)
- Length: 3,885–3,950 mm (153.0–155.5 in) (hatchback); 4,270 mm (168.1 in) (sedan)
- Width: 1,695 mm (66.7 in)
- Height: 1,475 mm (58.1 in) (hatchback); 1,480 mm (58.3 in) (sedan)
- Curb weight: 1,038 kg (2,288 lb) (hatchback); 1,053 kg (2,321 lb) (sedan)

The second-generation Mazda2 was launched at the 2007 Geneva Motor Show, and later at the 2007 Shanghai International Motor Show. It is built on the similar platform to the sixth-generation Ford Fiesta. It employs lightweight materials and reduces the overall dimensions of the car. This generation dropped the high-roof styling adopted by its predecessor, instead opting for a more conventional hatchback look. The lead designer for the second generation Mazda2 (or third generation Demio) was Ikuo Maeda, who was later promoted to Head of Design at Mazda in 2009.

For the Japanese domestic market, sales of the production vehicles began on 5 July 2007 at Mazda, Mazda ɛ̃fini and Autozam dealers. Production in Japan reached 100,000 units at the end of January 2008.

A three-door variant was released for the European market in 2008 at the 2008 Geneva Motor Show. Engine choices include the MZR 1.3-liter and 1.5-liter gasoline, MZ-CD 1.4-liter common-rail turbo diesel. In some European countries such as the Netherlands, there was the option to buy the gasoline car in bi-fuel LPG version from the factory.

The Chinese model of the Mazda2 in five-door hatchback body style launched at the 2007 Guangzhou Motor Show. A Chinese four-door sedan model of the Mazda2 was unveiled at the same event, with sales beginning in January, 2008.

The sedan body style was manufactured in Thailand and China and marketed only in Southeast Asia, Oceania, South America and the Caribbean.

In August 2010, it was reported that 400,000 units has been sold in Europe, Australia and Japan.

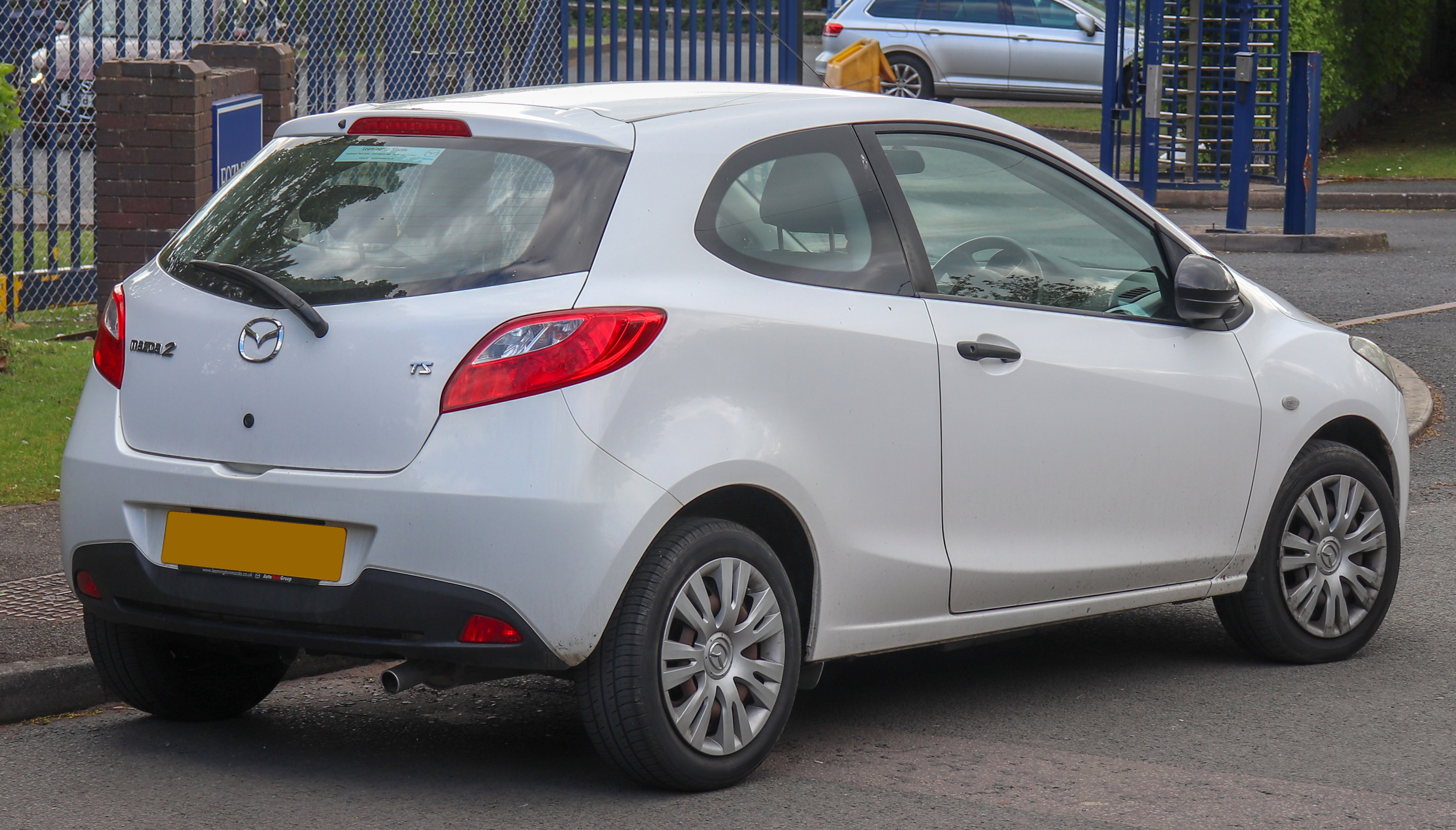
3-door hatchback

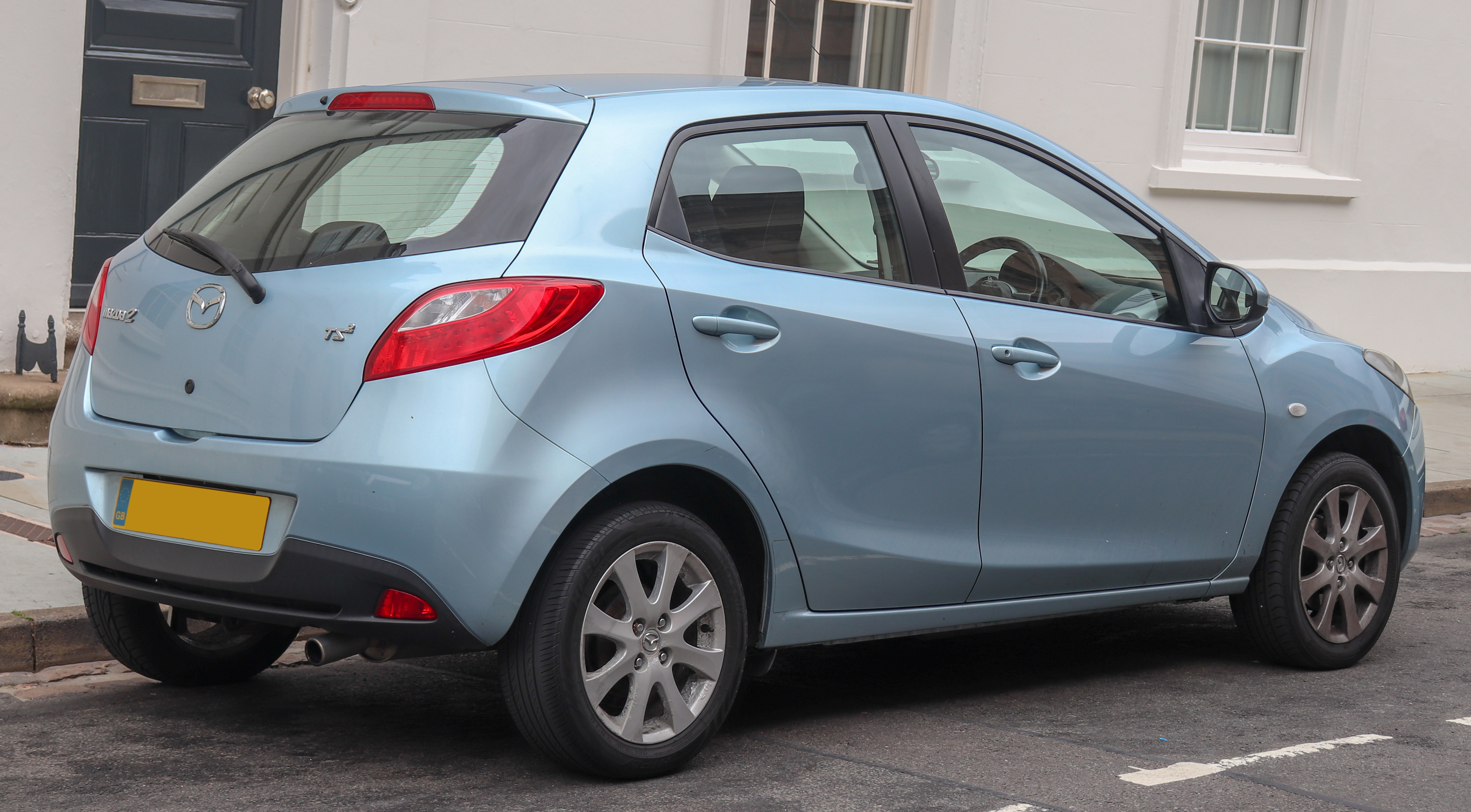
5-door hatchback

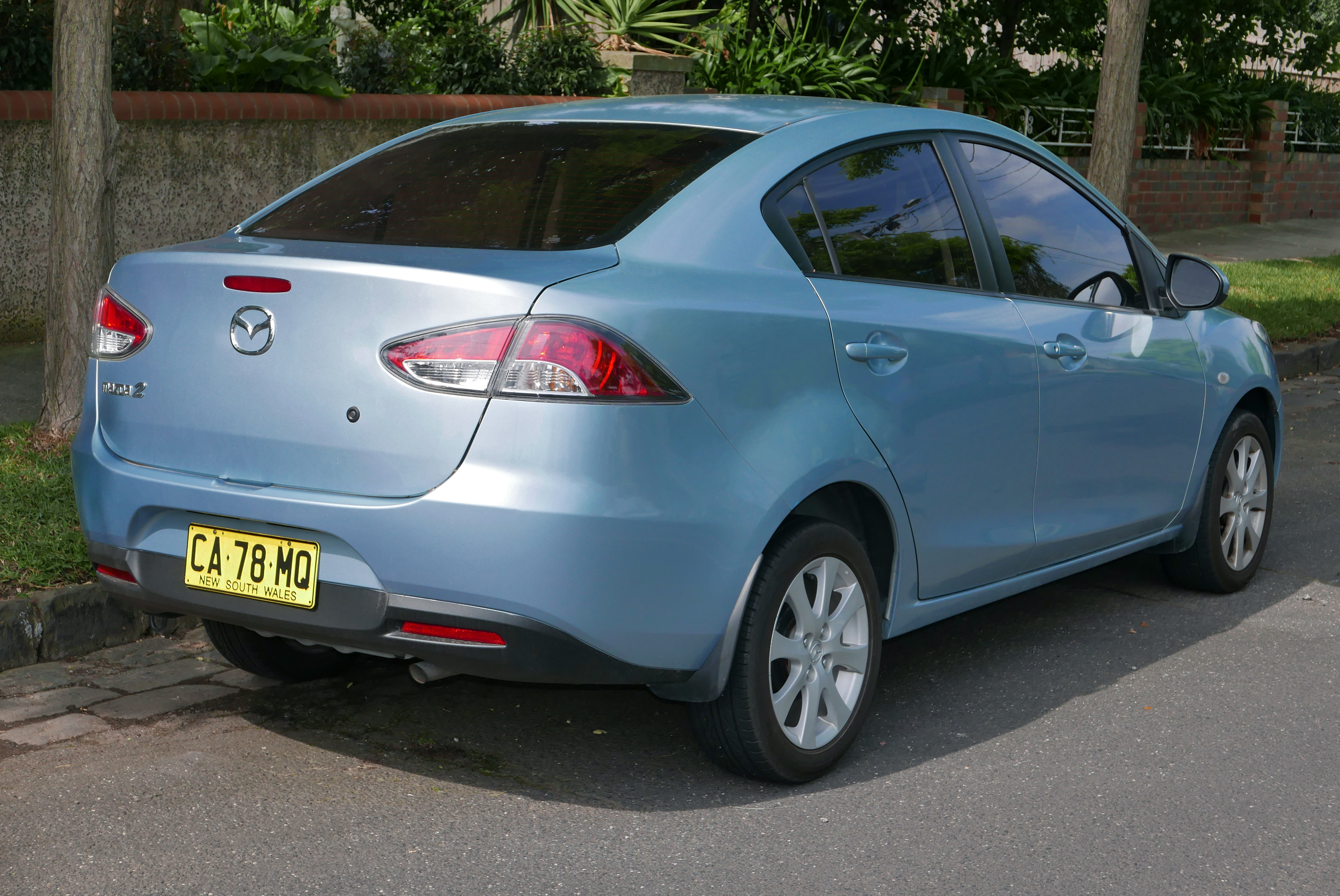
Sedan

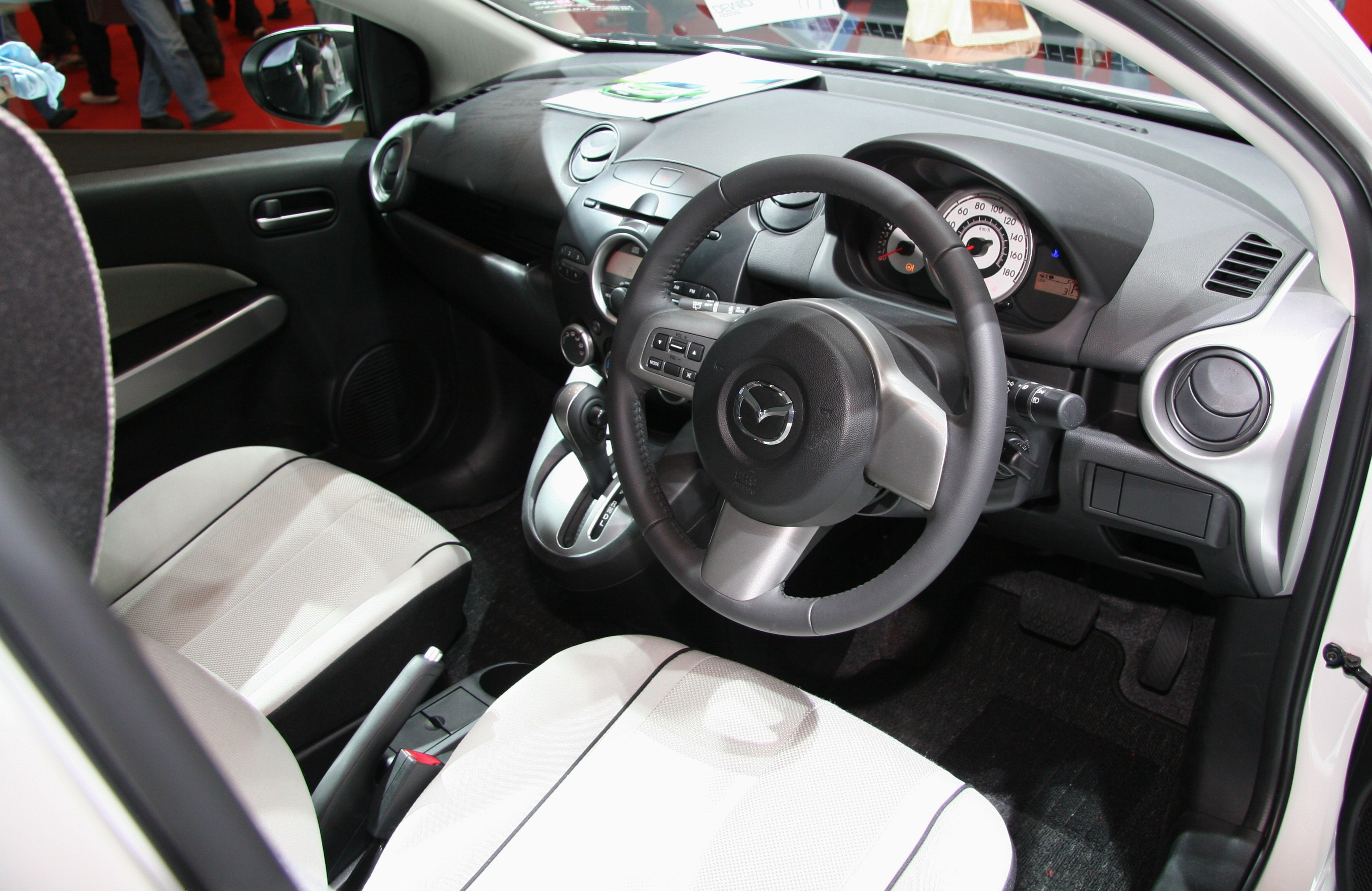
Interior

=== Powertrain ===
Transmission choices include a five-speed manual, a four-speed automatic, a CVT (only available in Japan and Hong Kong) or a CVT with a sport mode featuring seven simulated ratios and paddle shifters (only available in Japan).

Model	Years	Engine type	Power at rpm	Torque at rpm
Gasoline engines
1.3 L MZR (ZJ-VE)	2007–2014	1,349 cc (82.3 cu in) I4 (ZJ-VE)	87 PS (64 kW; 86 hp) at 6000	124 N⋅m (91 lb⋅ft) at 3500
1.3 L MZR (Low Power)	2007–2014	1,349 cc (82.3 cu in) I4 (ZJ-VE MZR)	75 PS (55 kW; 74 hp) at 6000	121 N⋅m (89 lb⋅ft) at 3500
1.3 L MZR	2007–2014	1,349 cc (82.3 cu in) I4 (ZJ-VE MZR)	86 PS (63 kW; 85 hp) at 6000	122 N⋅m (90 lb⋅ft) at 3500
1.3 L (Miller Cycle)	2007–2014	1,349 cc (82.3 cu in) I4 (ZJ-VEM)	90 PS (66 kW; 89 hp) at 6000	120 N⋅m (89 lb⋅ft) at 4000
1.5 L MZR (ZY-VE)	2007–2014	1,498 cc (91.4 cu in) I4 (ZY-VE)	103 PS (76 kW; 102 hp) at 6000	140 N⋅m (103 lb⋅ft) at 4000
1.5 L MZR	2007–2014	1,498 cc (91.4 cu in) I4 (ZY-VE MZR)	102 PS (75 kW; 101 hp) at 6000	137 N⋅m (101 lb⋅ft) at 4500
1.5 L MZR (NA spec)	2011–2014	1,498 cc (91.4 cu in) I4 (ZY-VE MZR)	101 PS (74 kW; 100 hp) at 6000	133 N⋅m (98 lb⋅ft) at 4000
Diesel engines
1.4 L MZ-CD	2007–2014	1,399 cc (85.4 cu in) I4 turbo (Y4)	68 PS (50 kW; 67 hp) at 4000	160 N⋅m (118 lb⋅ft) at 2000
1.6 L MZ-CD	2009–2014	1,560 cc (95.2 cu in) I4 turbo (Y6)	90 PS (66 kW; 89 hp) at 4000	212 N⋅m (156 lb⋅ft) at 1750

=== Safety ===
The Mazda2 received a "Good" rating from the Insurance Institute for Highway Safety in frontal crashes, "Acceptable" for side crashes, "Good" for roof strength, and "Acceptable" for rear crash protection.

Euro NCAP test results* Mazda2 (2007)
Test	Score	Rating
Adult occupant:	34	5 /5 stars
Child occupant:	37	4 /5 stars
Pedestrian:	18	2 /4 stars

ANCAP test results* Mazda 2 all variants with ESC and 6 airbags (2008)
Test	Score
Overall	5 /5 stars
Frontal offset	15.55/16
Side impact	14.78/16
Pole	2/2
Seat belt reminders	2/3
Whiplash protection	Not Assessed
Pedestrian protection	Marginal
Electronic stability control	Optional

ANCAP test results* Mazda 2 variants with 2 airbags (2010)
Test	Score
Overall	4 /5 stars
Frontal offset	15.55/16
Side impact	13.30/16
Pole	Not Assessed
Seat belt reminders	2/3
Whiplash protection	Not Assessed
Pedestrian protection	Marginal
Electronic stability control	Optional

ANCAP test results* Mazda 2 all variants (2010)
Test	Score
Overall	5 /5 stars
Frontal offset	15.55/16
Side impact	14.78/16
Pole	Not Assessed
Seat belt reminders	2/3
Whiplash protection	Not Assessed
Pedestrian protection	Marginal
Electronic stability control	Standard

ASEAN NCAP test results Mazda 2 (2015)
Test	Points	Stars
Adult occupant:	13.10	4 /5 stars
Child occupant:	78%	0 /5 stars
Safety assist:	NA	

=== Production ===
The vehicles were built in Ujina Plant No.1 (U1) in Hiroshima, with additional Mazda2 began at the Ujina Plant No.2 (U2) in June 2007. Additional vehicles were built in Hofu, Japan.

Chinese models were built in Changan Ford Mazda's Nanjing plant at the end of October 2007.

Asia-Pacific region models were produced by AutoAlliance Thailand beginning in 2009. Mazda2 local assembly in Vietnam began in October 2011 at the Nui Thanh Quang Nam plant owned by Vina Mazda Automobile Manufacturing.

=== 2010 facelift ===
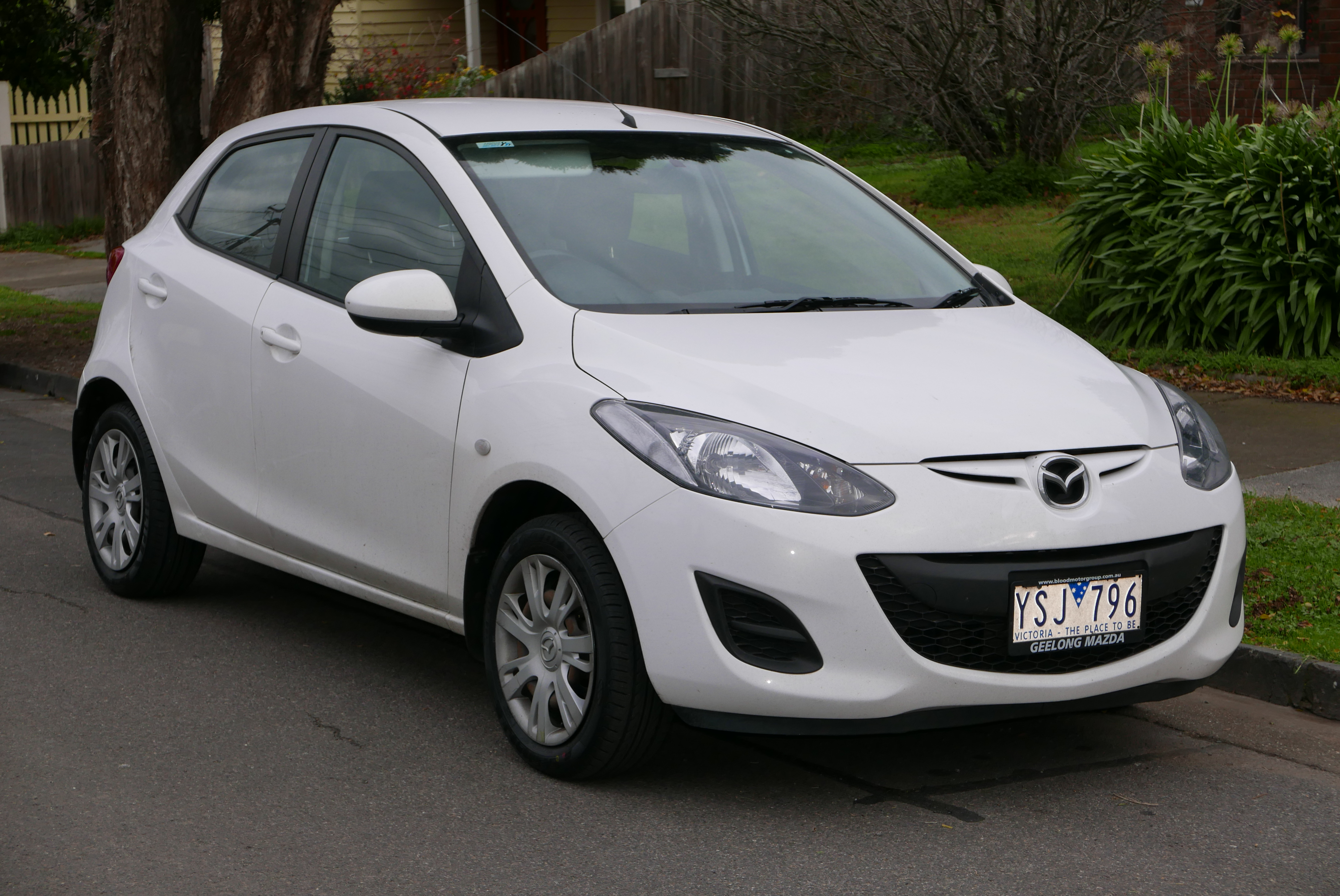

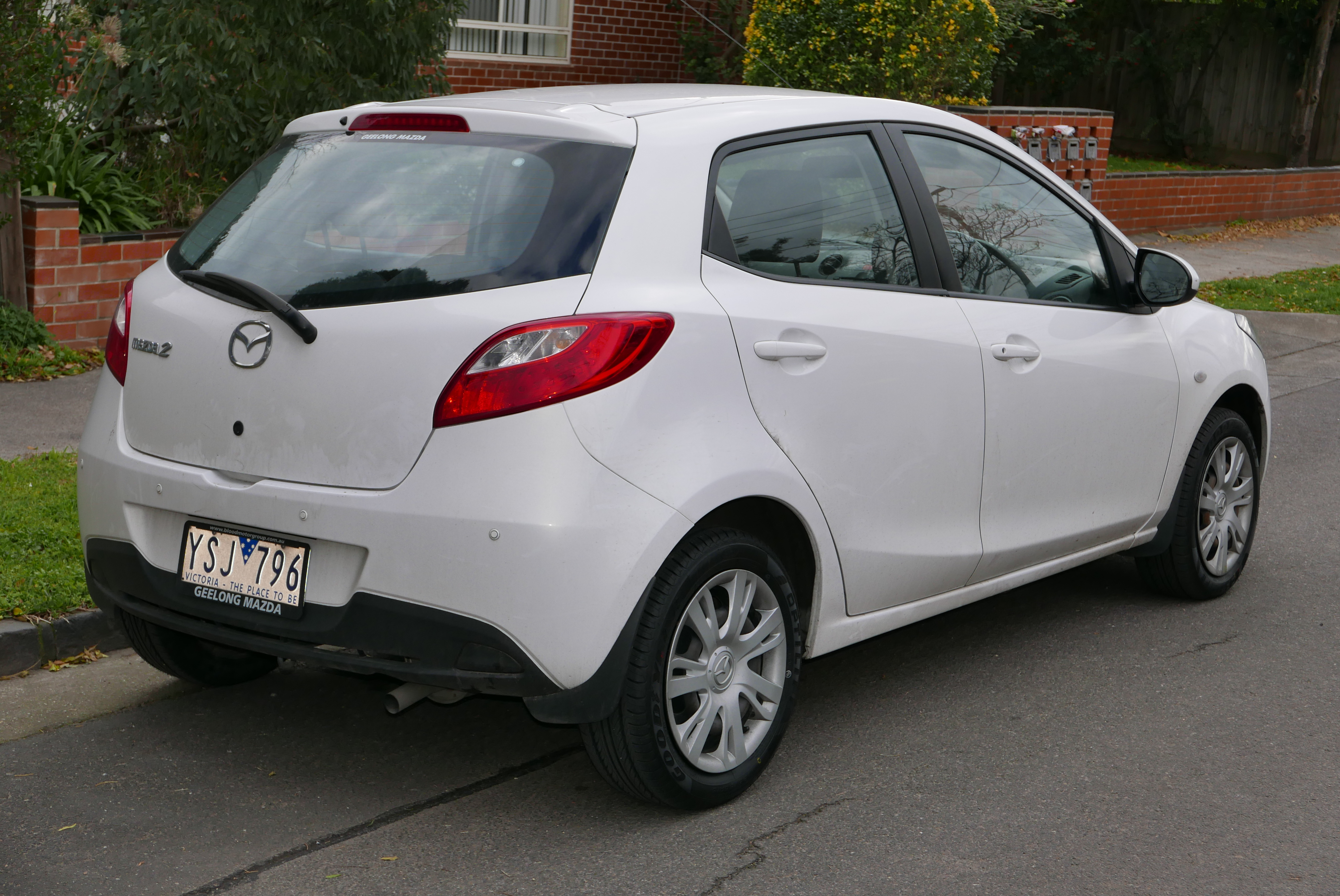
5-door hatchback (facelift)

The facelifted Mazda2 hatchback was first revealed in Thailand in October 2009, and launched in Thailand and Indonesia in November 2009. The Mazda2 was launched in Malaysia on 5 April 2010 in sedan and hatchback body styles, and is available in V and R grade levels. It is powered by a 1.5-liter MZR engine paired to a four-speed automatic.

In Australia, the sedan was introduced along with the facelifted hatchback in May 2010, with the sedan version being offered in a single 'Maxx' grade. In February 2011, Mazda Australia had reverted to Japanese sourced production, which led to the discontinuation of the sedan being offered after just 9 months on-sale.

The facelift was rolled out in Europe at the end of 2010 for the 2011 model year.

==== North America ====
The North American version of the Mazda2 debuted at the 2009 LA Auto Show, and later at the 2010 Canadian International AutoShow. The Mazda2 became available in July 2010 with the 1.5-liter, 100 hp four-cylinder with either a 5-speed manual or 4-speed automatic transmission.

Two trims were offered in the United States: the base "Sport" and the upper-level "Touring." Sport models included 15-inch steel wheels with covers, air conditioning, a remote keyless entry system, and power mirrors, windows, and locks, and a 4-speaker audio system. Touring models added upgraded seat fabric, 15-inch aluminum wheels, fog lights, rear spoiler, chrome exhaust tip, a leather wrapped steering wheel with audio and cruise control, trip computer, and a 6-speaker audio system. A USB input was added for the 2013 model year, otherwise, minimal changes were made throughout the Mazda2's run in the United States except for the availability of exterior color options.

The Mazda2 was discontinued in the United States and Canada after the 2014 model year.

==== 2011 update (Japanese models) ====
Updated models include premium seat upholstery, black meter panel, silver instrument panel garnish, expanded exterior body colors including Burgundy Red Mica, standard trip computer. The 15C (with CVT), 13C-V and 13C (with a four-speed electronically controlled automatic transmission) models include Mazda's eco-lamp. Sport, 15C, 13C-V and 13C (with e-4WD) model grades include new three-point seatbelt and headrest on the second-row center seat as standard equipment. SPORT model includes 16-inch alloy wheels.

The 13-Skyactiv model includes the first Skyactiv engine, a 1.3-liter with 62 kW (84 PS; 83 hp) and 113 N⋅m (83 lb⋅ft), intelligent-Drive Master (i-DM), CVT transmission, 14-inch alloy wheels, Aquatic Blue Mica exterior body color option, dynamic stability control with brake assist, traction control.

Preorders of the new model began on 9 June 2011, while sales of the new model began on 30 June 2011.

The Demio 13-Skyactiv was nominated for Car of The Year Japan in 2012.

==== Demio EV (2012) ====
The Demio EV is a limited (100 leased units) production electric vehicle for the Japanese market. It includes a 346-Volt 20kWh lithium-ion battery with 200 km (124 miles) driving range. Leasing began in October 2012.

===== Prototype Range Extender for EV (2013) =====
The range extender test car was a version of the Mazda2 prototype electric car with a 0.33-liter rotary engine, lithium-ion batteries, 75 kW electric motor driving front wheels and 10-liter fuel tank. This would double the range of the Demio EV, meeting Japanese requirements that the fuel tank and engine not provide more range than the electric motor. The 1,280 kg (2,820 lb) car would have a 200 kg (440 lb), 20 kWh lithium-ion battery pack, powering a 75 kW (102 PS; 101 hp) / 150 N⋅m (15 kg⋅m; 110 lb⋅ft) electric motor. The prototype range extender incorporates a 28 kW (38 PS; 38 hp) rotary engine generator, a lightweight 100 kg (220 lb) downsized single-rotor Wankel engine with 330 cc (20 cu in) displacement mounted on its side in the rear of the car. A 10 L (2.2 imp gal; 2.6 US gal) fuel tank that can be filled with gasoline, butane, or propane was claimed to almost double the EV range to 380 km (235 miles).

== Third generation (DJ/DL; 2014) ==
Third generation
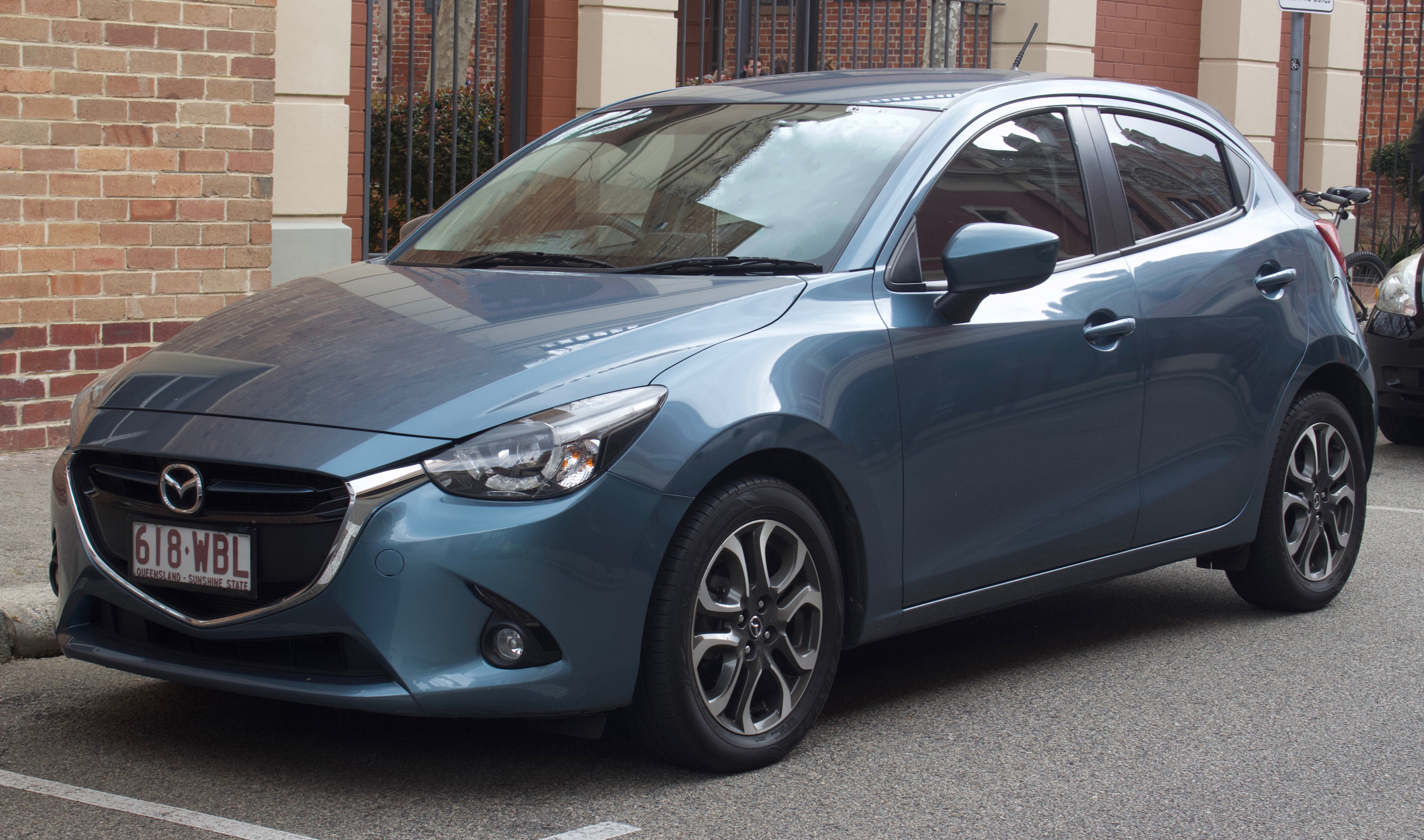
- Hatchback (DJ; pre-facelift, 2014-2019)

Overview
- Model code: DJ (hatchback); DL (sedan)
- Also called: Mazda Demio (Japan; 2014–2019); Scion iA (US; 2016); Toyota Yaris (Canada; 2016–2020, US; 2019–2020); Toyota Yaris R (Mexico; 2016–2020); Toyota Yaris iA (US; 2017–2018)
- Production: July 2014 – present
- Assembly: Japan: Hōfu (Hōfu Plant No. 1); Thailand: Rayong (AutoAlliance Thailand); Mexico: Salamanca, Guanajuato (MMVO); Vietnam: Chu Lai, Nui Thanh District, Quang Nam (Vietnam Motors, until 2018)
- Designer: Ryo Yanagisawa

Body and chassis
- Body style: 5-door hatchback; 4-door sedan
- Related: Mazda CX-3

Powertrain
- Engine: Gasoline: 1.3 L Skyactiv-G P3-VPS I4; 1.5 L Skyactiv-G P5-VPS I4; Gasoline MHEV: 1.5 L Skyactiv-Hybrid P5 I4; 2.0 L Skyactiv-G PE-VPS I4; Diesel: 1.5 L Skyactiv-D S5-DPTS I4 turbo
- Transmission: 5-speed Skyactiv-MT manual; 6-speed Skyactiv-MT manual; 6-speed Skyactiv-Drive automatic
- Hybrid drivetrain: Mild hybrid (Mazda M Hybrid)
- Battery: 24 V lithium-ion (M Hybrid)

Dimensions
- Wheelbase: 2,570 mm (101.2 in)
- Length: 4,060–4,105 mm (159.8–161.6 in) (hatchback); 4,320–4,360 mm (170.1–171.7 in) (sedan)
- Width: 1,695 mm (66.7 in)
- Height: 1,495–1,525 mm (58.9–60.0 in) (hatchback); 1,470–1,485 mm (57.9–58.5 in) (sedan)
- Curb weight: 975–1,240 kg (2,150–2,734 lb) (hatchback; including AWD and Hybrid models); 1,050–1,115 kg (2,315–2,458 lb) (sedan)

Chronology
- Predecessor: Scion xD (for Scion iA, North America)

In July 2014, Mazda unveiled the third-generation Mazda2 hatchback. Its design was previously previewed by the Mazda Hazumi Concept model, which was showcased at the 2014 Geneva Motor Show. Designed under the lead of chief designer Ryo Yanagisawa, the vehicle adopted the "Kodo" design philosophy created by the brand, and built with Skyactiv-branded engines, transmissions, body, and chassis loosely derived from the CX-5. While the model features greater length and wider front and rear tracks, it offers decreased interior room for rear-seat occupants and less front head and legroom.

Production began at Mazda's Hōfu plant in the same month. Sales in Japan began in September 2014. The sedan version debuted at the Thailand International Motor Expo in November 2014. Special editions included the Tamura, adding leather to the SE Air Con model.

Production of the Mazda2 for various North and South American markets began in October 2014 at the newly built Mazda de México Vehicle Operation (MMVO) factory in Salamanca, Guanajuato. Despite being produced in North America, Mazda did not sell the vehicle in Canada or the United States (except in Puerto Rico). Instead, the Mazda2 would be sold by Toyota Motor North America in those markets between 2016 and 2020 initially as the Scion iA and later the Toyota Yaris iA and simply Toyota Yaris.

In October 2014, the Demio was awarded the 2014–2015 "Car of the Year" by the Japan Car of the Year Committee.

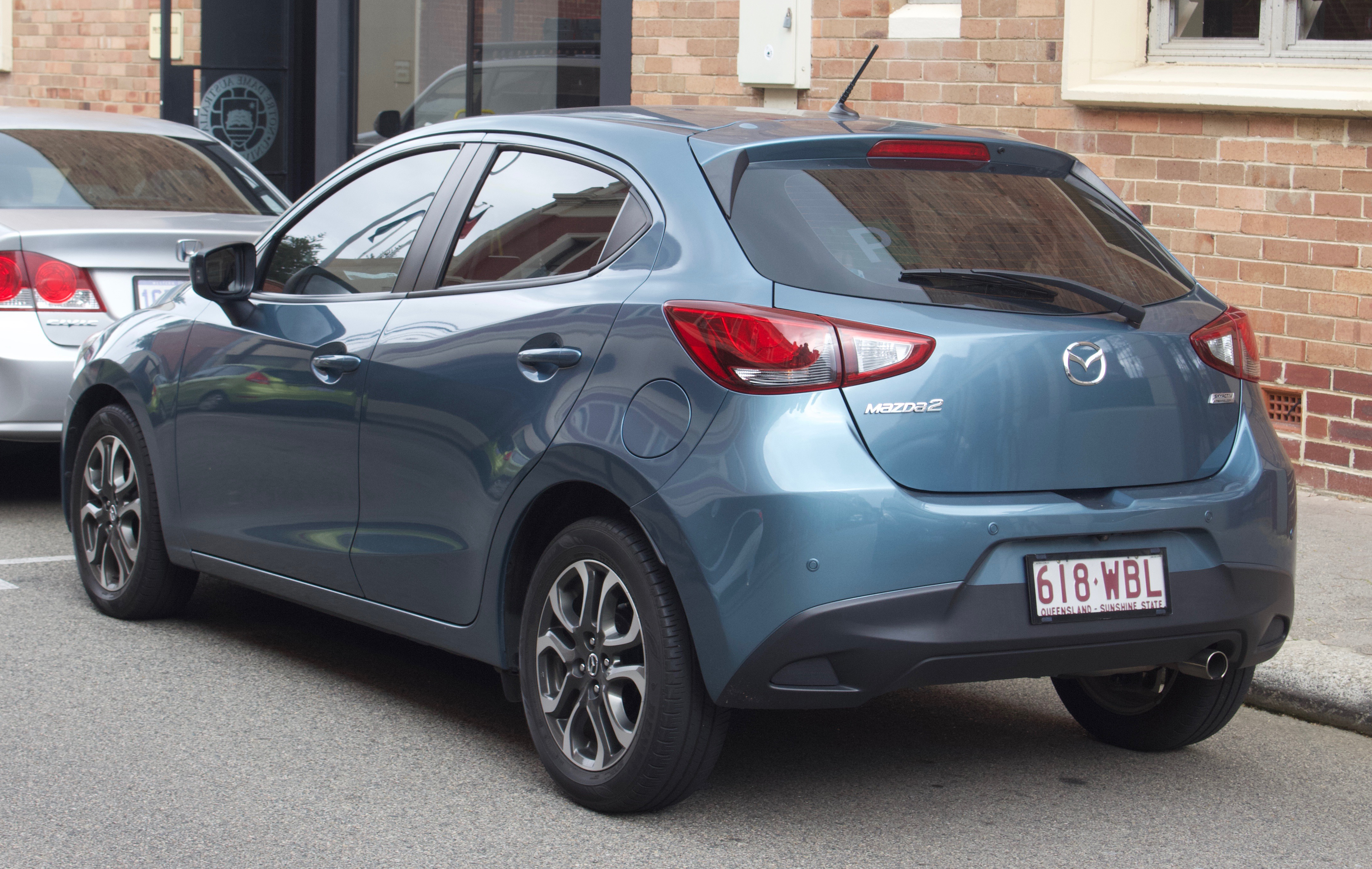
Hatchback (DJ; pre-facelift)

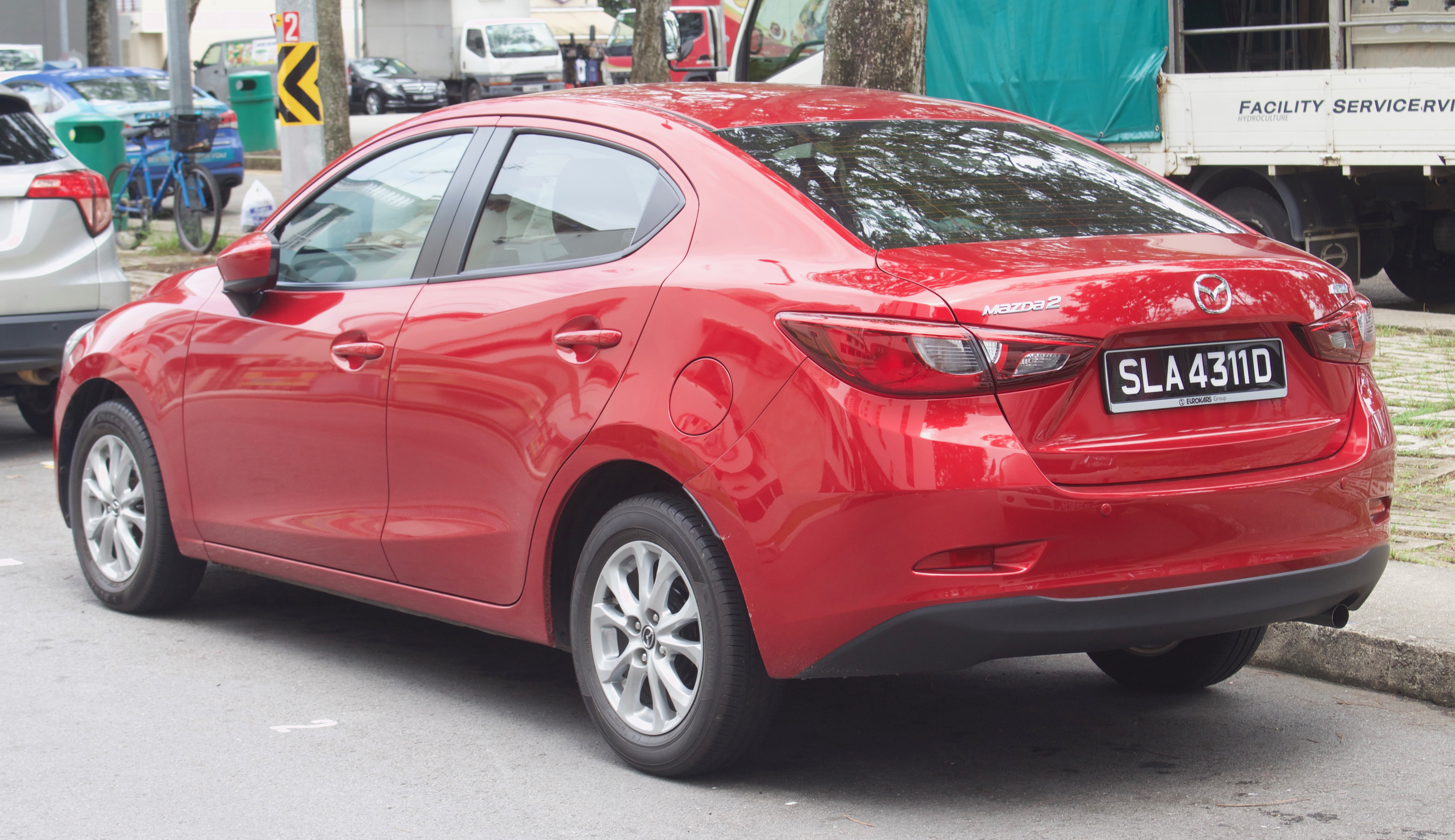
Sedan (DL; pre-facelift)

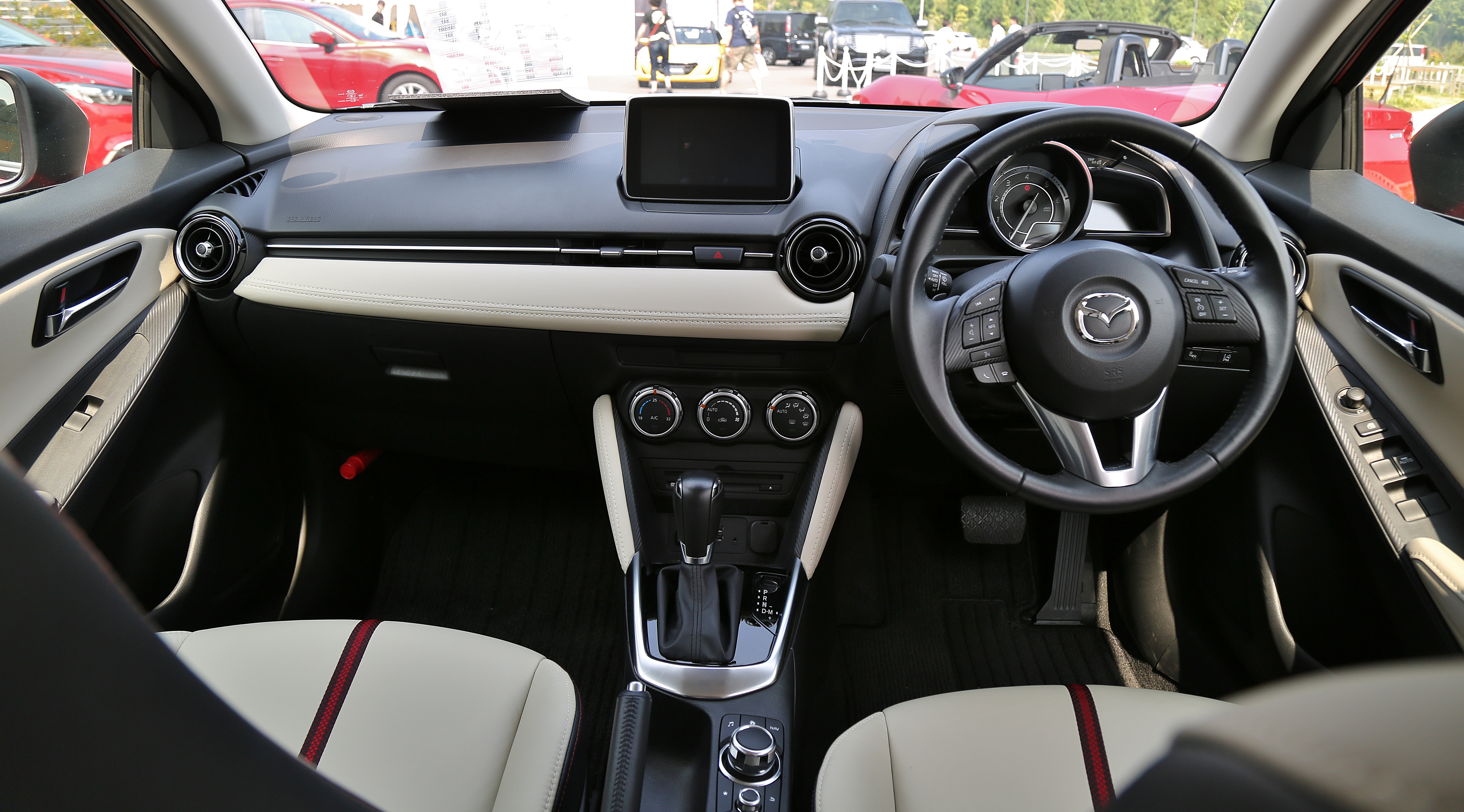
Interior (2014–2017)

=== 2019 facelift ===
The third-generation received a facelift in 2019 with various exterior changes, interior trim changes, revised suspension tuning to improve ride quality, improvements to the engine deceleration energy recovery system, adaptive headlights, and standard G-Vectoring Control Plus. With the facelift model, the Demio nameplate for the Japanese domestic market was renamed into the Mazda2 moniker in September 2019.

The facelift model went on sale in Mexico in October 2019 for the 2020 model year. It comes in three versions: i, i Touring, and i Grand Touring with automatic transmission.

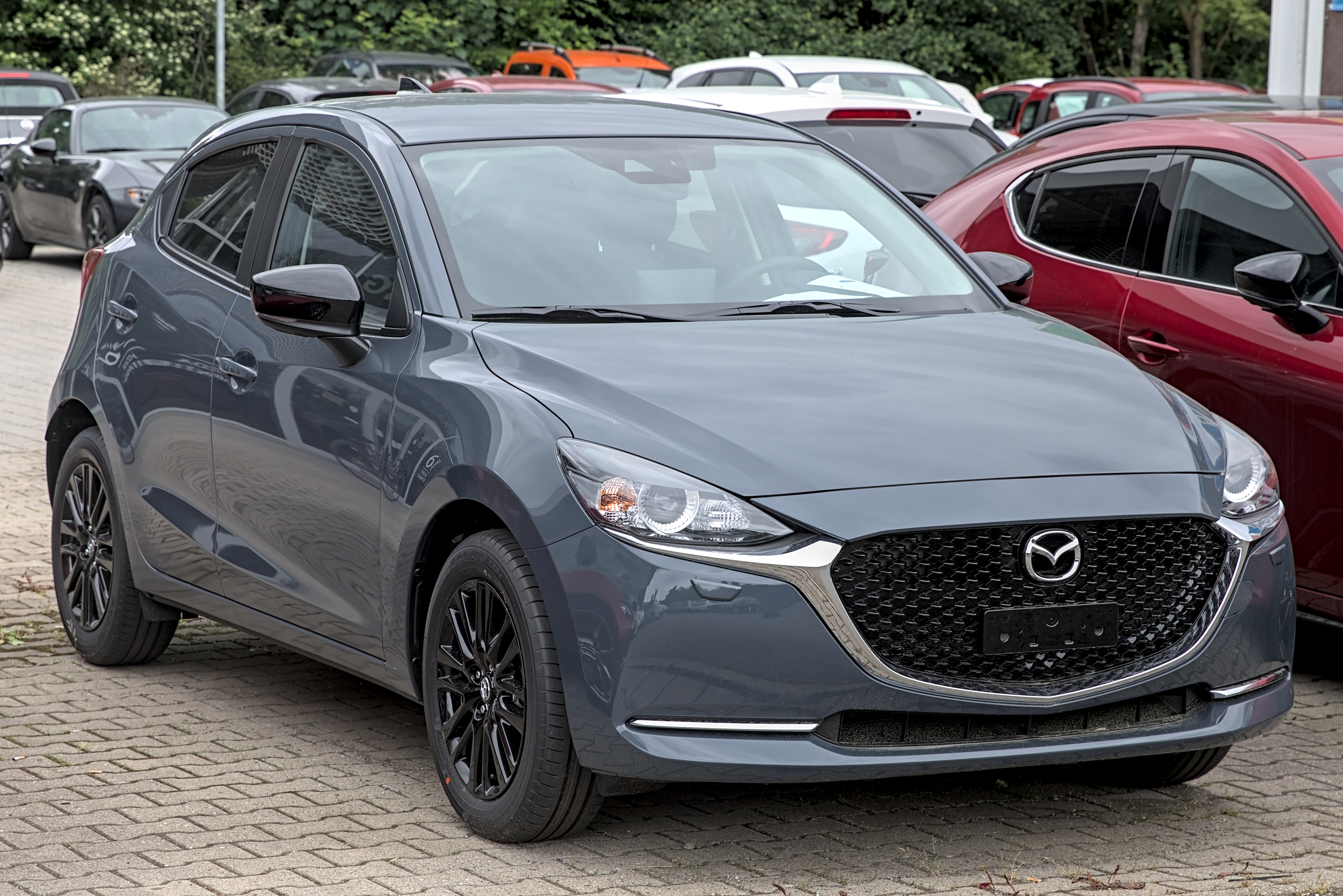
Hatchback (first facelift)

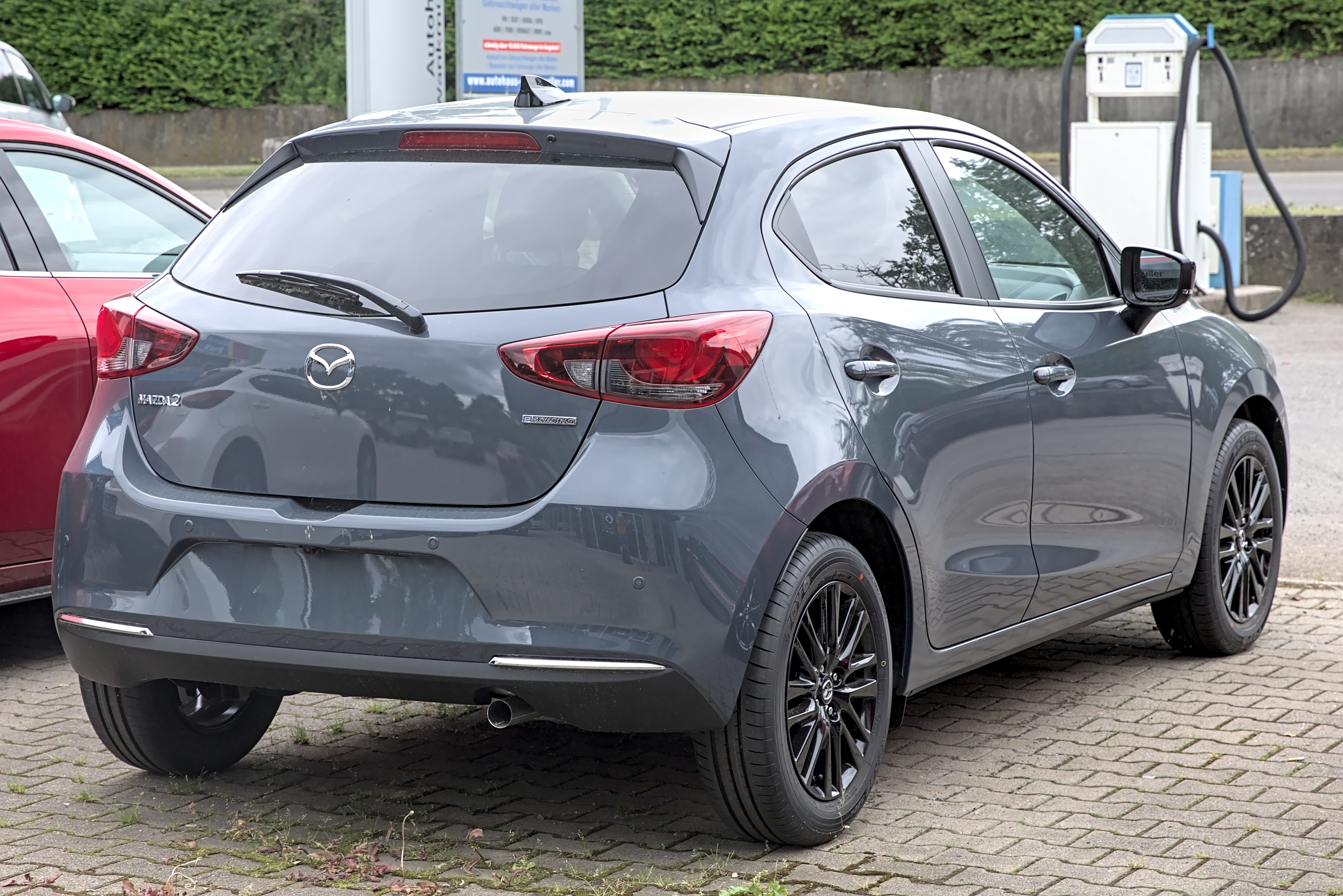
Hatchback (first facelift)

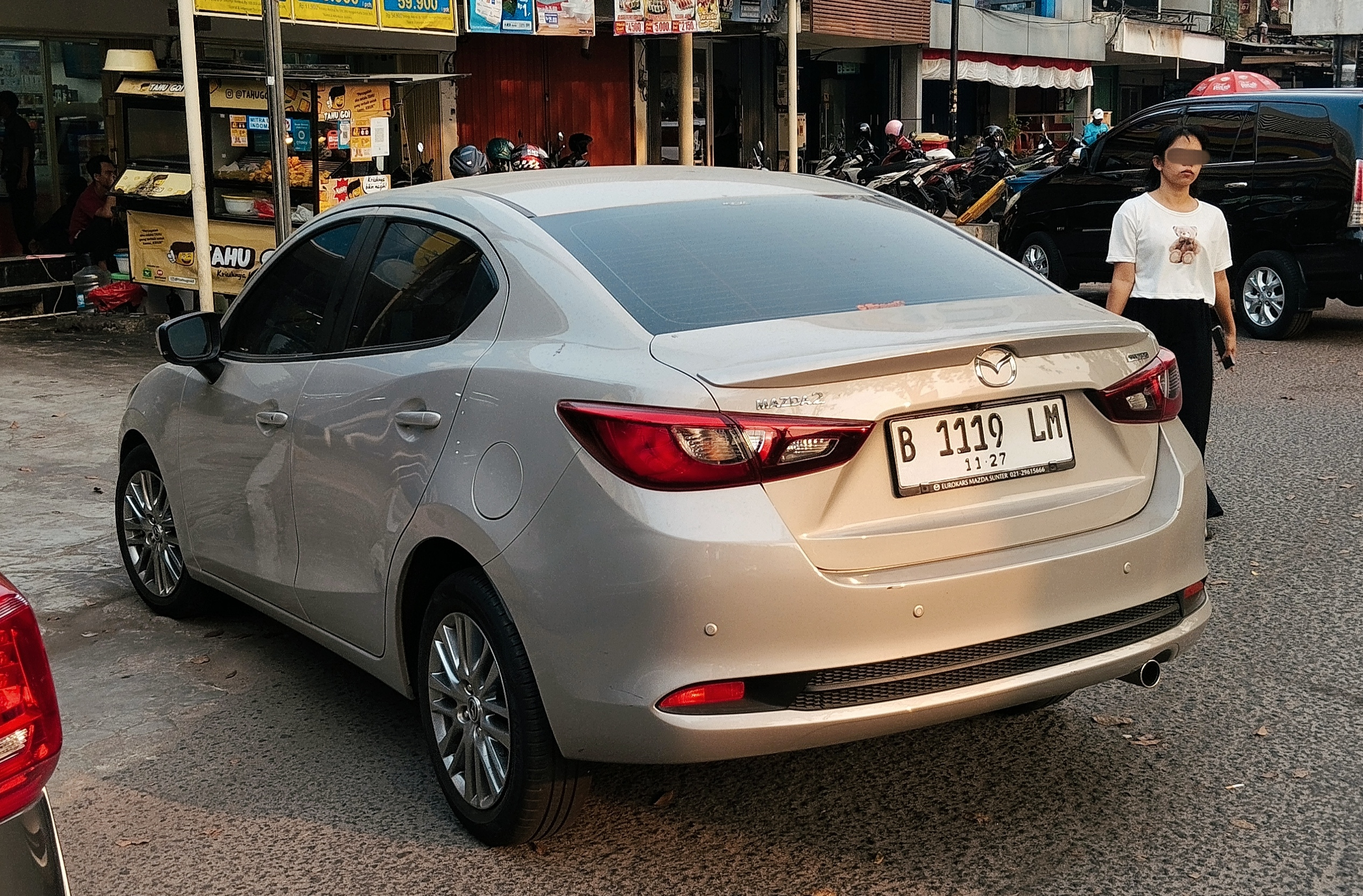
Sedan (first facelift)

=== 2023 facelift ===
The Mazda2 received a second facelift on 27 January 2023. Changes included a black or body colored insert, larger Mazda logo, restyled front, and a restyled rear bumper for hatchbacks and the GT sedan. A yellow or red grille is available depending on trim selection.

New colors, including the Aero Grey Metallic and Airstream Blue Metallic are both available. The Evolve and GT trims add a black interior and red stitching, which was initially only available on the Pure SP trim level.

Additionally, new seat designs and a new key fob are introduced. Auto-folding side mirrors, dusk sensing for the LED headlights, and rain-sensing windscreen wipers are standard. Mazda claims the new 2 has improved CO_{2} emissions.

In Australia, the updated 2 went on sale in June 2023. Deliveries started in July.

In February 2025, the gasoline-powered Mazda2 was discontinued in the UK, with the Toyota Yaris-derived Mazda2 Hybrid as its successor. In 2026, the Mazda2 was discontinued in Indonesia.

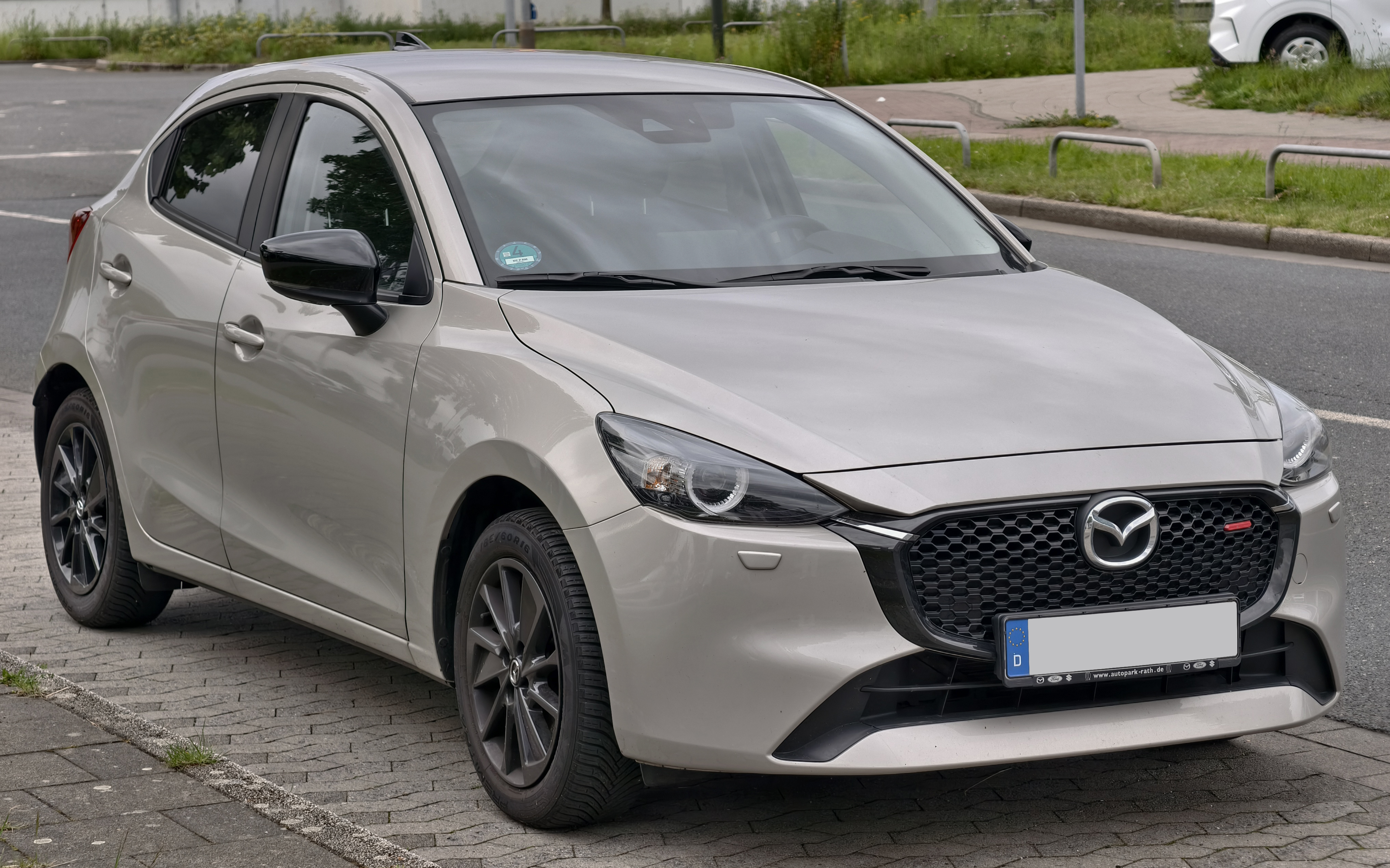
Hatchback (second facelift)

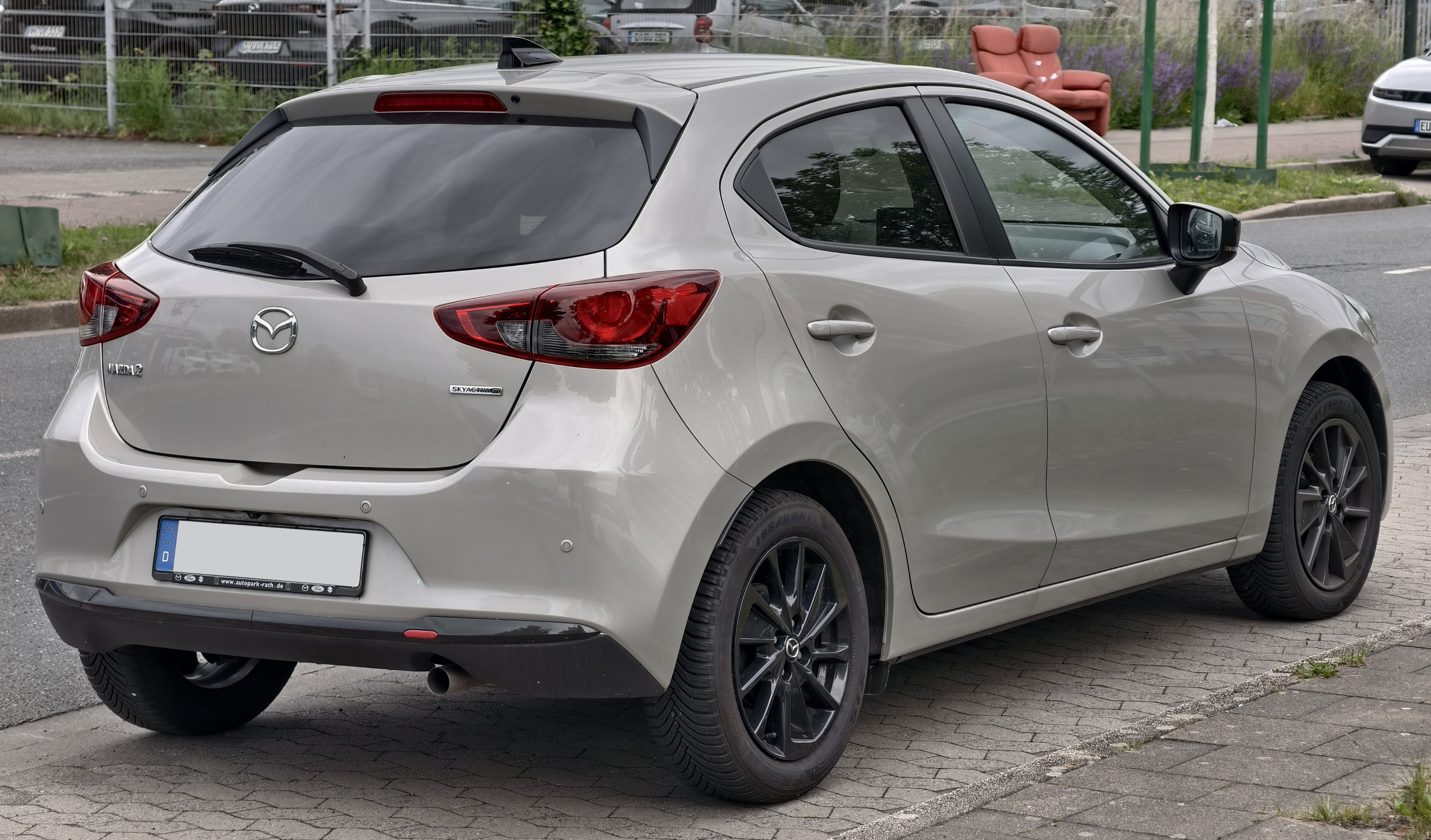
Hatchback (second facelift)

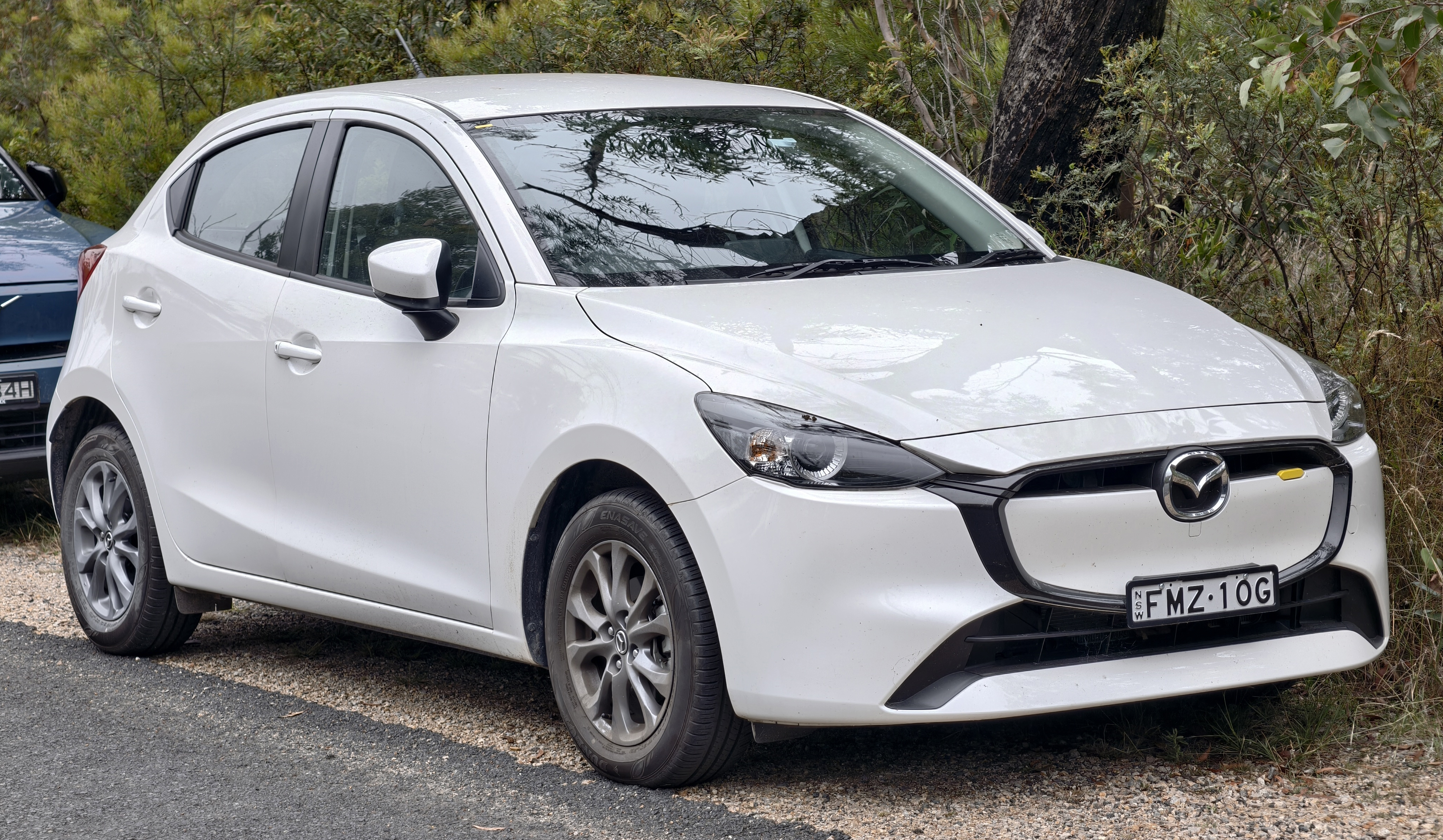
Hatchback (second facelift)

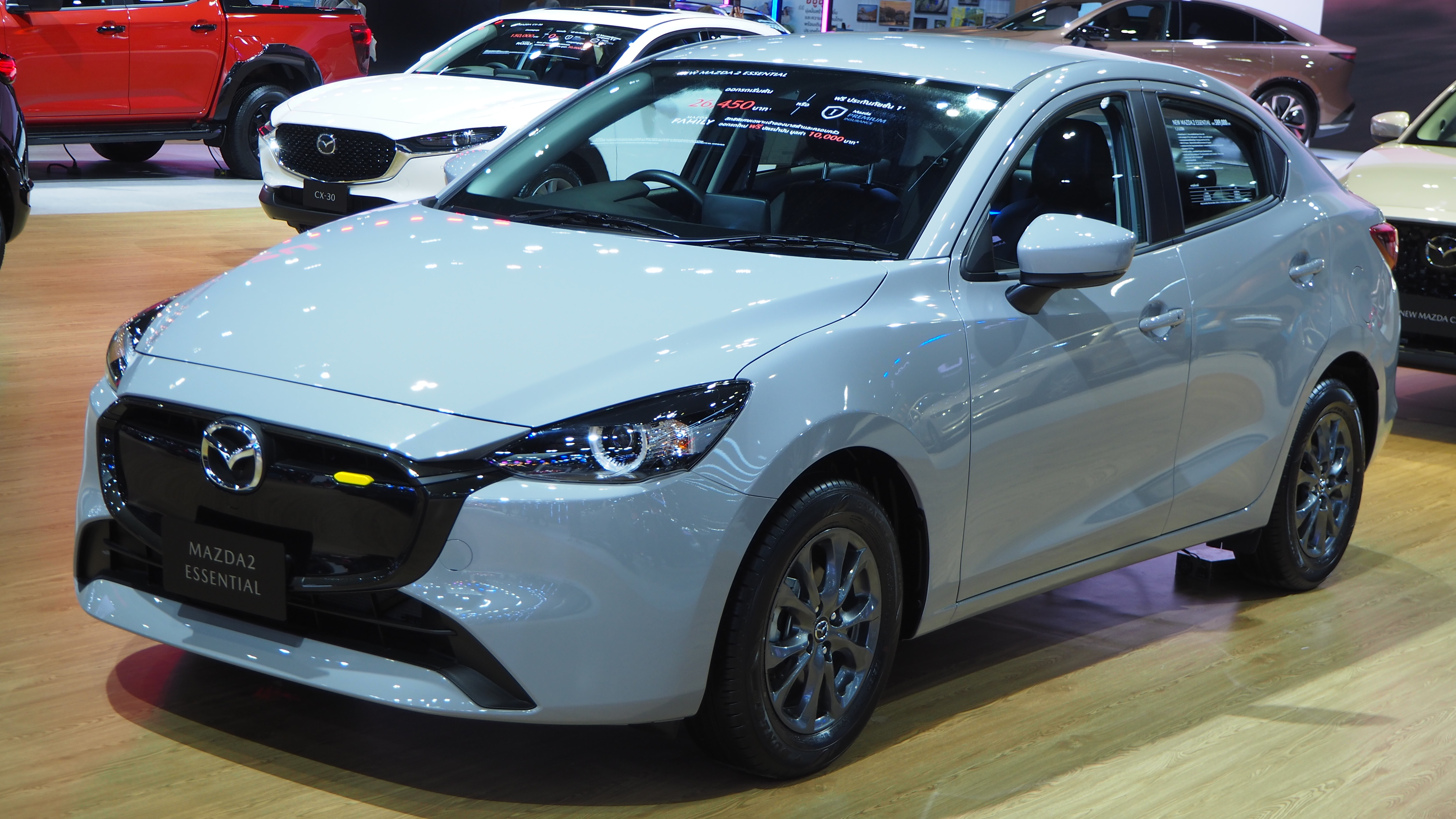
Sedan (second facelift)

=== Engines and transmission ===
The Mazda2 uses the automaker's Skyactiv-Drive six-speed automatic and Skyactiv-MT five- and six-speed manual transmissions, as well as the i-STOP stop-start system, which replaces a conventional alternator and turns the engine off when the car is stationary, and the i-ELOOP brake energy regeneration system, which uses braking to charge a capacitor to store energy to power vehicle electronics, when the engine is shut off.

The Mazda2 was initially offered with a 1.5‑liter gasoline engine and a 1.5‑liter diesel engine. The diesel, a Skyactiv-D 1.5‑liter unit, debuted at the 2014 Geneva Motor Show. The diesel engine was discontinued in Europe in 2019, and a 1.5‑liter mild hybrid gasoline engine was introduced in 2020, available only with a six-speed manual transmission.

In February 2024, Mazda introduced the Mazda2 Grand Touring LX Carbon Edition hatchback in Colombia, powered by a 2.0‑liter gasoline engine producing 140.8 PS (104 kW; 139 hp) at 6,000 rpm and 186 N⋅m (137 lb⋅ft) at 2,800 rpm.

Model	Engine type	Years	Power at rpm	Torque at rpm
Gasoline
Skyactiv-G 1.3 P3‑VPS	1,298 cc (79.2 cu in) I4	2014–	93 PS (68 kW; 92 hp) at 5,800	123 N⋅m (91 lb⋅ft) at 4,000
Skyactiv-G 1.5 P5‑VPS	1,496 cc (91.3 cu in) I4	2015‍–‍2020	75 PS (55 kW; 74 hp) at 6,000	135 N⋅m (100 lb⋅ft) at 3,800
Skyactiv-G 1.5 P5‑VPS	1,496 cc (91.3 cu in) I4	2015‍–‍2020	90 PS (66 kW; 89 hp) at 6,000	148 N⋅m (109 lb⋅ft) at 4,000
Skyactiv-G 1.5 P5‑VPS	1,496 cc (91.3 cu in) I4	2015‍–‍2020	111 PS (82 kW; 109 hp) at 6,000	148 N⋅m (109 lb⋅ft) at 4,000
Skyactiv-G 1.5 P5‑VPS	1,496 cc (91.3 cu in) I4	2014–	110 PS (81 kW; 108 hp) at 6,000	141 N⋅m (104 lb⋅ft) at 4,000
Skyactiv-G 1.5 P5‑VPS	1,496 cc (91.3 cu in) I4	2014–	115 PS (85 kW; 113 hp) at 6,000	148 N⋅m (109 lb⋅ft) at 4,000
Skyactiv-G 1.5 P5‑VPS	1,496 cc (91.3 cu in) I4	2020–	75 PS (55 kW; 74 hp) at 6,000	143 N⋅m (105 lb⋅ft) at 3,500
Skyactiv-G 1.5 P5‑VPS	1,496 cc (91.3 cu in) I4	2020–	90 PS (66 kW; 89 hp) at 6,000	151 N⋅m (111 lb⋅ft) at 3,500
Skyactiv-G 2.0 PE‑VPS	1,998 cc (121.9 cu in) I4	2024–	141 PS (104 kW; 139 hp) at 6,000	186 N⋅m (137 lb⋅ft) at 2,800
Diesel
Skyactiv-D 1.5 S5‑DPTS	1,499 cc (91.5 cu in) I4 turbo	2014–	105 PS (77 kW; 104 hp) at 4,000	250 N⋅m (184 lb⋅ft) at 1,500–2,000
Hybrid
Skyactiv-Hybrid 1.5 F‑P5	1,496 cc (91.3 cu in) I4	2019–	90 PS (66 kW; 89 hp) at 6,000	151 N⋅m (111 lb⋅ft) at 3,500
Skyactiv-Hybrid 1.5 F‑P5	1,496 cc (91.3 cu in) I4	2019–	115 PS (85 kW; 113 hp) at 6,000	151 N⋅m (111 lb⋅ft) at 3,500

=== Scion iA/Toyota Yaris iA/Toyota Yaris (North America) ===
While the Mazda2 is produced in North America at Mazda's plant in Mexico, the company did not sell the vehicle in Canada or the United States (except in Puerto Rico). Instead, the Mazda2 was sold by Toyota Motor North America in those markets between 2015 and 2020.

In Canada, the vehicle was sold as the Yaris Sedan across all model years. In Mexico, the vehicle was sold as the Yaris R, alongside the larger and lower-priced Yaris Sedán (a variant of the Vios and later the Yaris Ativ). The Yaris R was sold in three versions.

In the United States, the sedan was sold under several names. In the initial 2016 model year, it was marketed under Toyota's youth-oriented Scion brand as the Scion iA, where it was the only 4-door sedan and only model not to be built in Japan to be marketed under the brand. After discontinuing the Scion brand, the car was rebranded as the Toyota Yaris iA for the 2017 and 2018 model years. For the 2019 and 2020 model years, the sedan was rebranded again as the Toyota Yaris Sedan.

When first introduced, like all Scion vehicles, the iA only had one trim level (monospec) and only offered buyers a choice of exterior color and a choice between 6-speed manual and 6-speed automatic transmissions. For 2019, with the Yaris Sedan rebranding, the vehicle received a minor facelift, and L, LE and XLE trim levels were introduced with a variety of interior and exterior options.

The hatchback variant of the Mazda2 was not initially sold by Toyota, which instead offered a Yaris Liftback based on the Toyota Vitz (XP130). After the Vitz was discontinued, a model called the Yaris Hatchback, based on the Mazda2, went on sale in October 2019 for the 2020 model year.

Exports of both the sedan and hatchback to the United States were stopped in June 2020 due to new regulations and slow sales. In July, it was cancelled in the Canadian market. The Mazda2 based Yaris was also discontinued in Mexico on August 27, 2020, leaving only the Thai-imported XP150 series Yaris and Yaris Sedán as its indirect replacements.

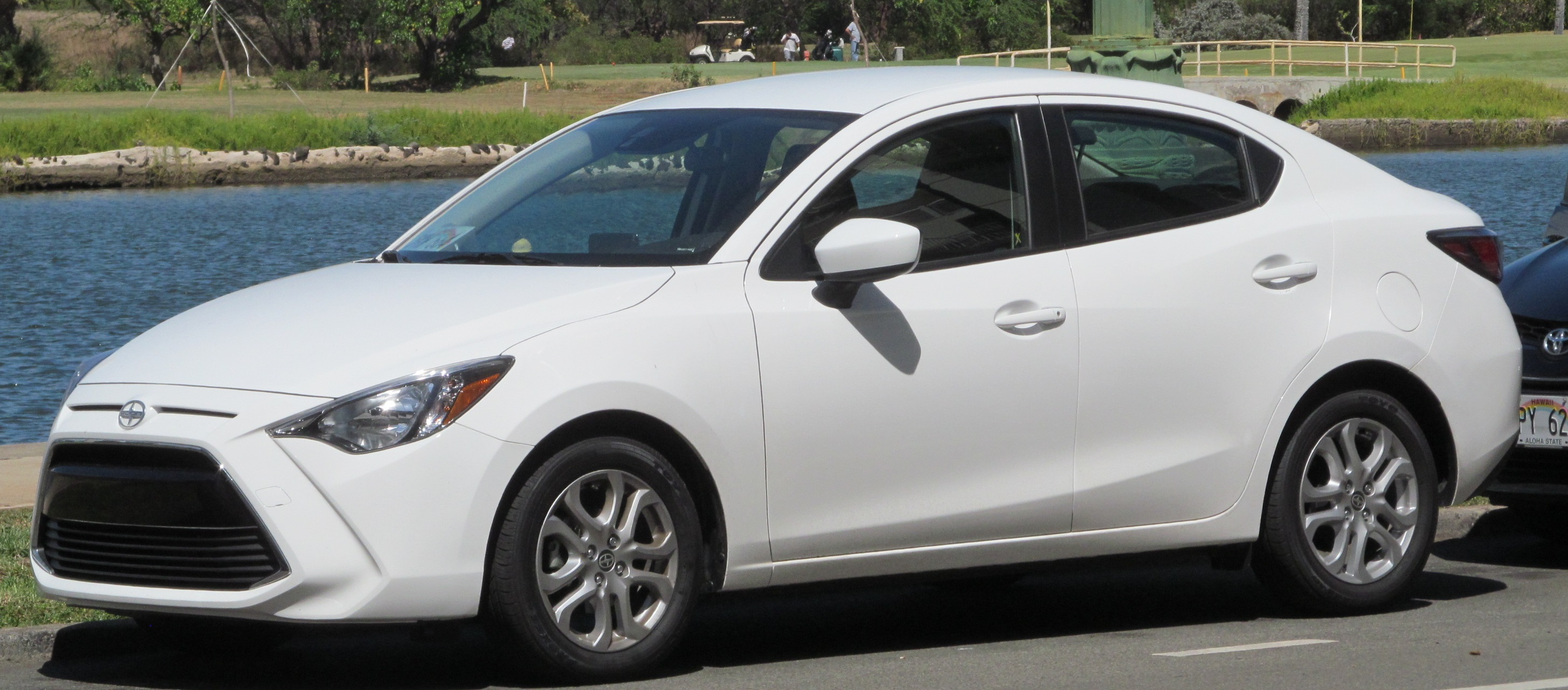
2016 Scion iA

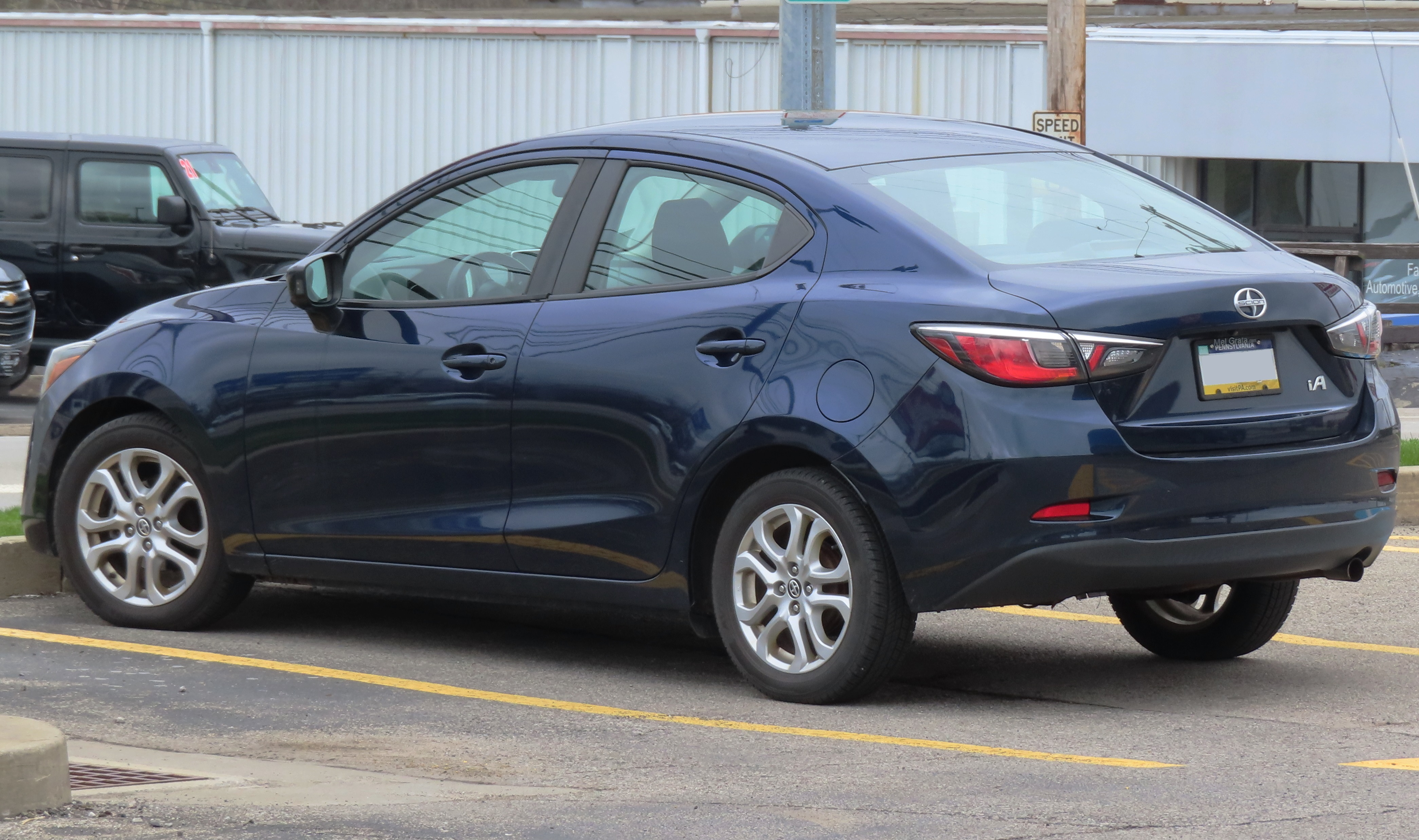
2016 Scion iA

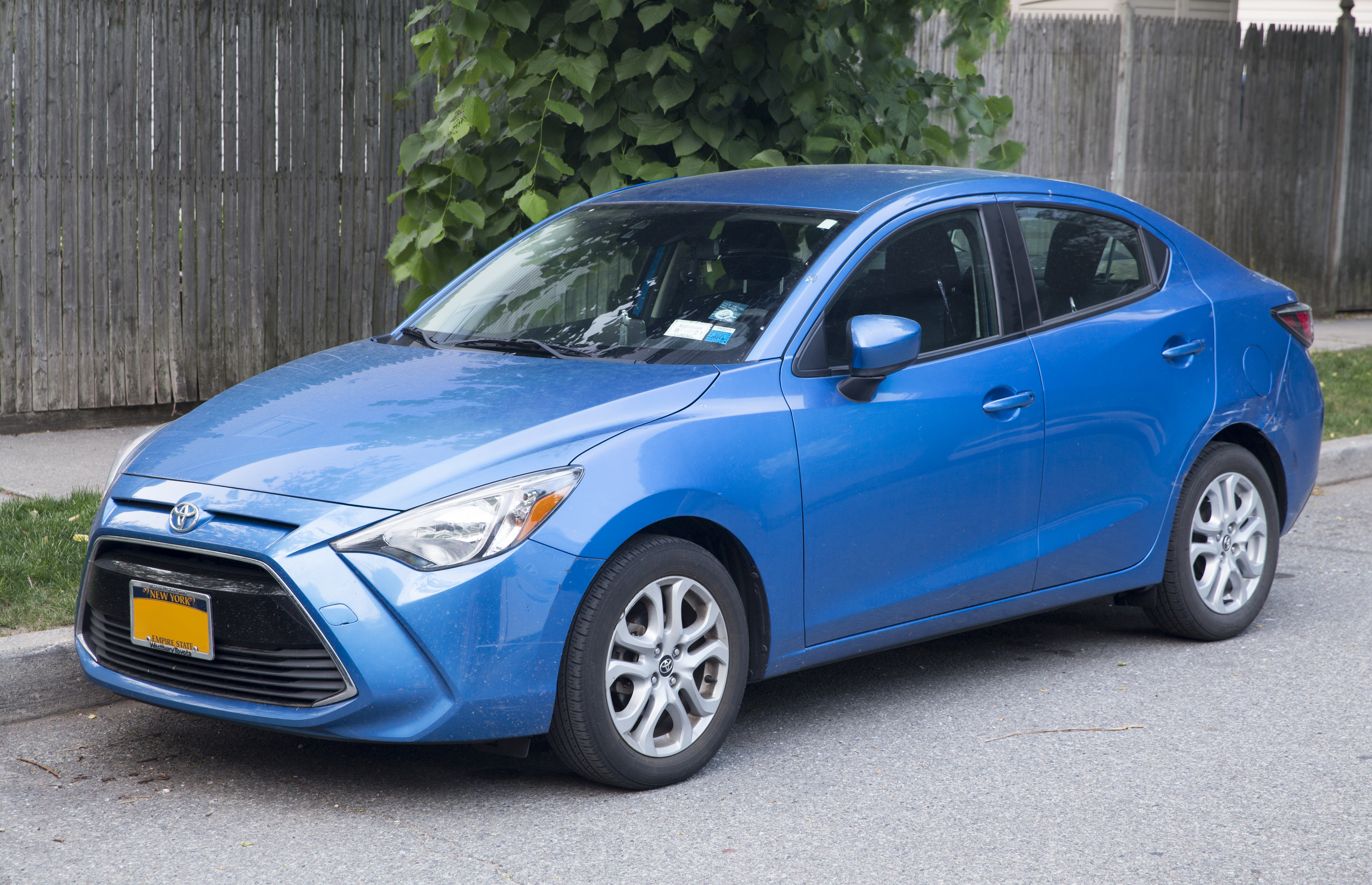
2017 Toyota Yaris iA sedan

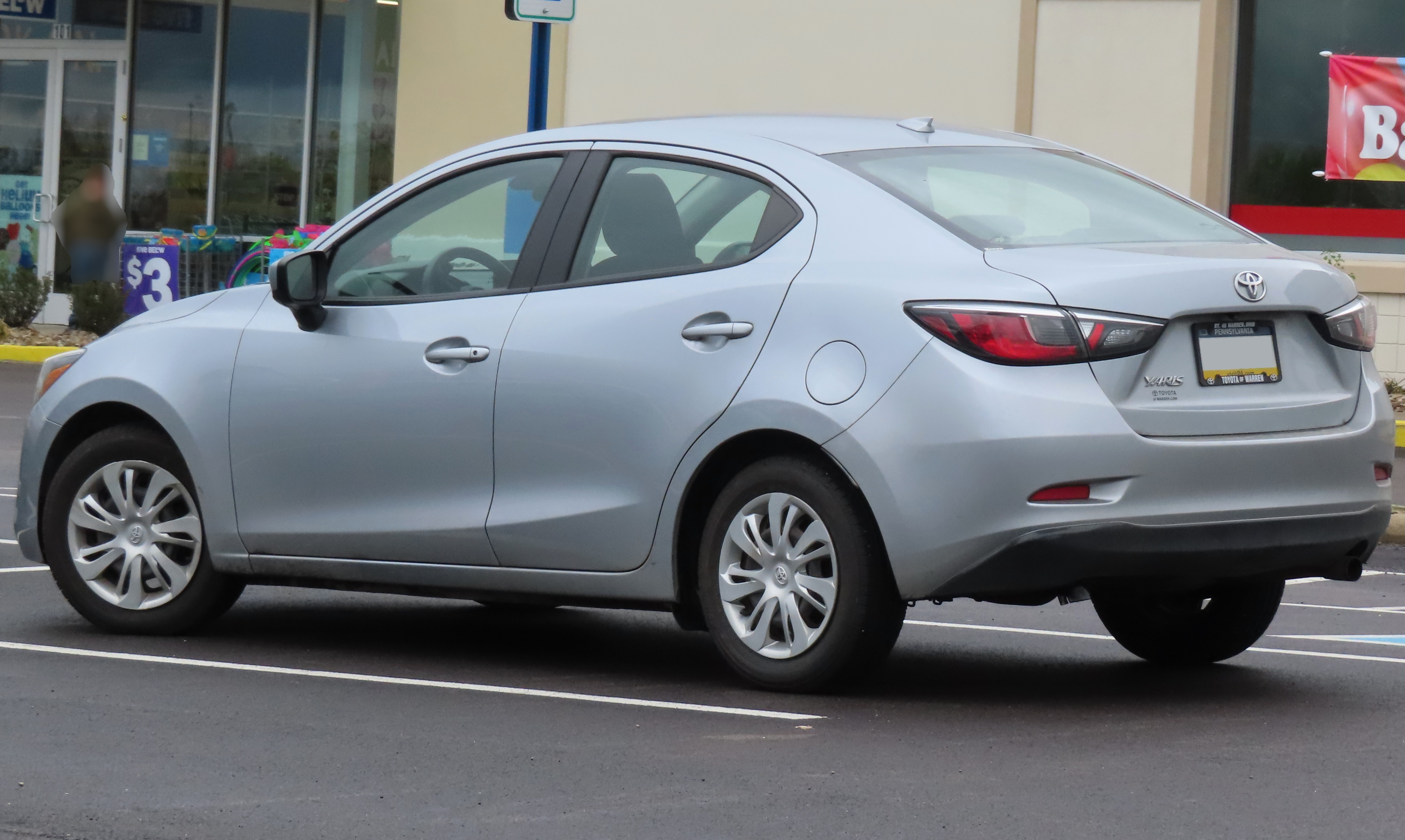
2020 Toyota Yaris L sedan

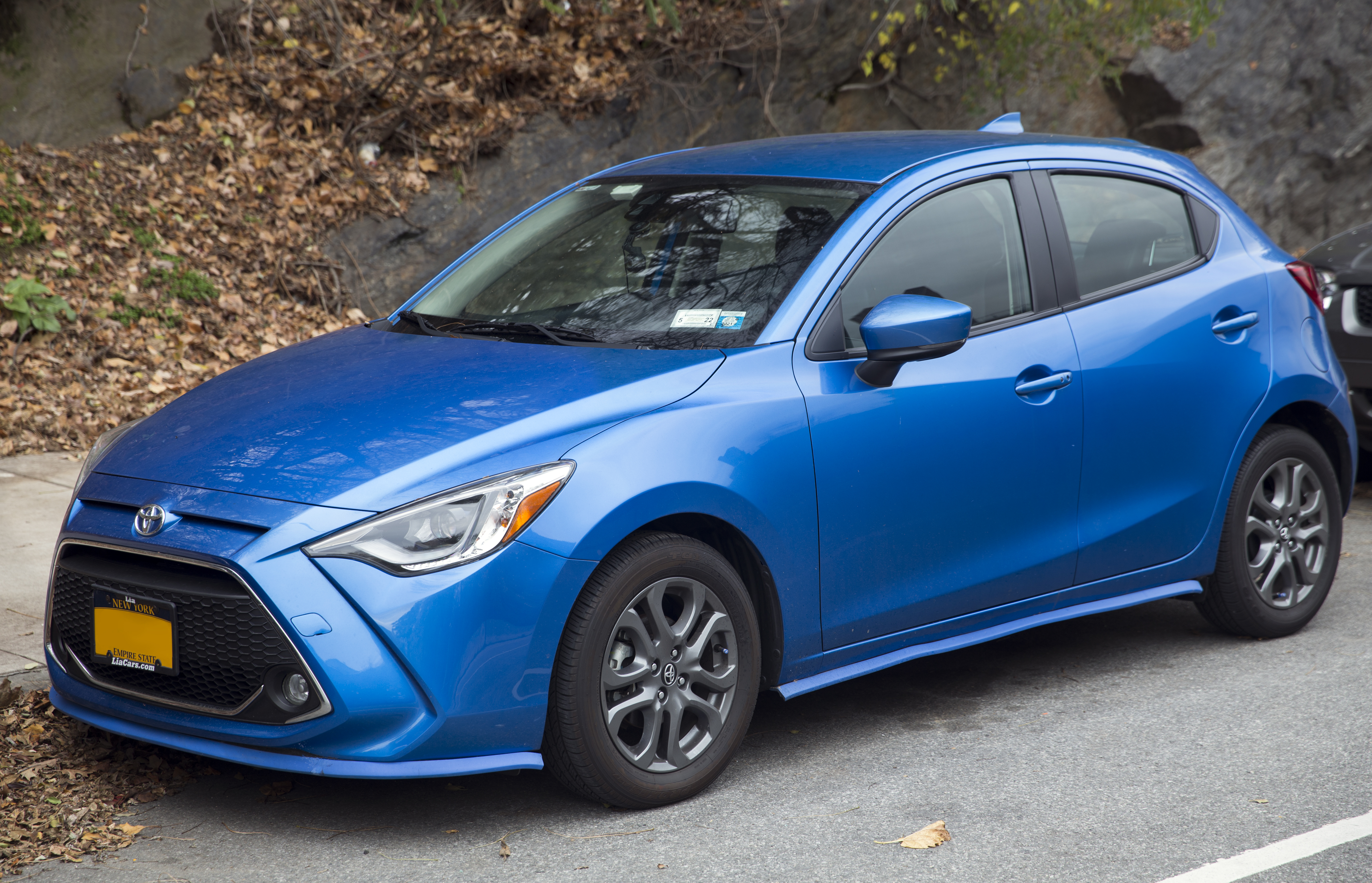
2020 Toyota Yaris XLE hatchback

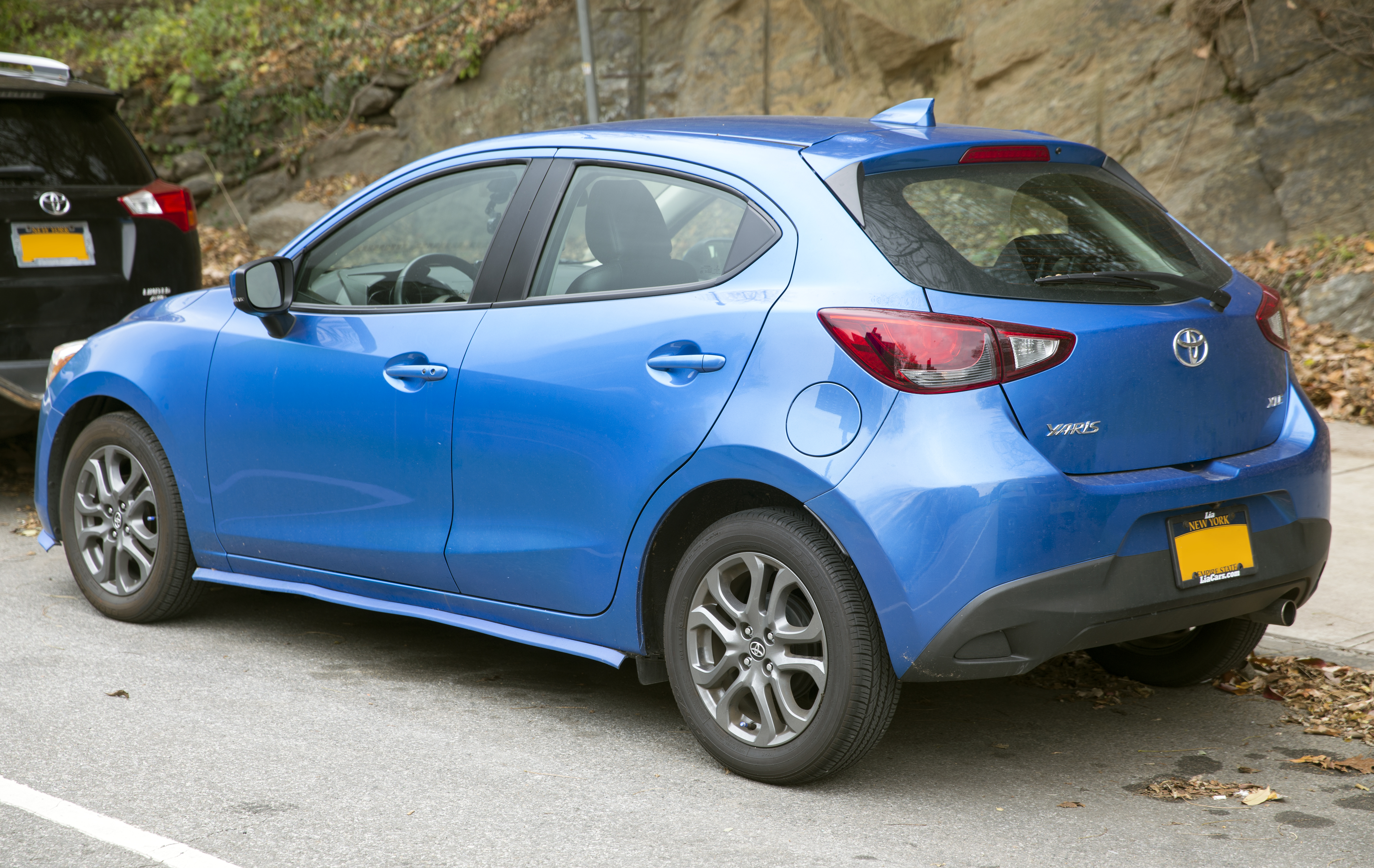
2020 Toyota Yaris XLE hatchback

=== Safety ===
Euro NCAP test results* Mazda 2 (2015)
Test	Points	%
Overall:	4 /5 stars	
Adult occupant:	32.8	86%
Child occupant:	38.5	78%
Pedestrian:	30.3	84%
Safety assist:	8.3	64%

ANCAP (2015)
Test	Rating
Overall Stars	5/5 stars
Frontal Offset	15.69/16
Side Impact	15.66/16
Pole	2/2
Whiplash Protection	Good
Pedestrian Protection	Good
ESC	Standard
Seat Belt Reminders	3/3
Overall Score	36.35/37
Airbags	Dual Frontal, Side, Head

IIHS
Test	Rating
Small overlap front (driver)	Good
Small overlap front (passenger)	Good
Moderate overlap front	Good
Side	Good
Roof strength	Good
Head restraints & seats	Good
Headlights	Poor
Front crash prevention: vehicle-to-vehicle	Advanced
Front crash prevention: vehicle-to-pedestrian	—N/a
LATCH ease of use (2016–2020; sedan)	Marginal
LATCH ease of use (2020; hatchback)	Acceptable

JNCAP
Test	Rating
Overall stars	5/5 stars
Collision safety performance	185.7/208
Preventive safety performance	16.8/40

Latin NCAP 2.0 test results Mazda 2 + 2 Airbags (2018, based on Euro NCAP 2008)
Test	Points	Stars
Adult occupant:	28.66/34.0	2 /5 stars
Child occupant:	33.81/49.00	3 /5 stars

== Other versions ==
=== Toyota Yaris-based model (XP210; 2022) ===
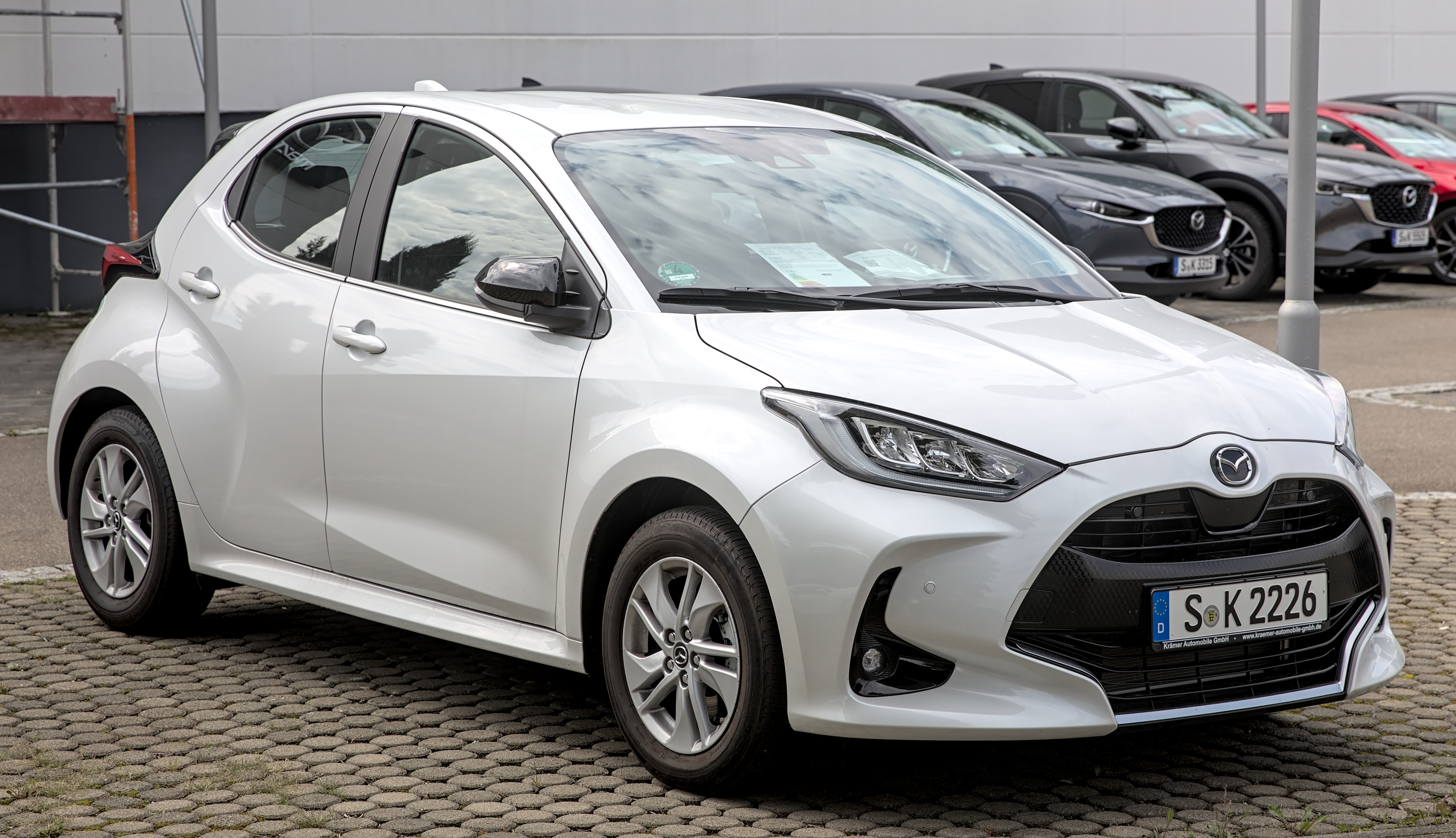
Mazda2 Hybrid (pre-facelift)

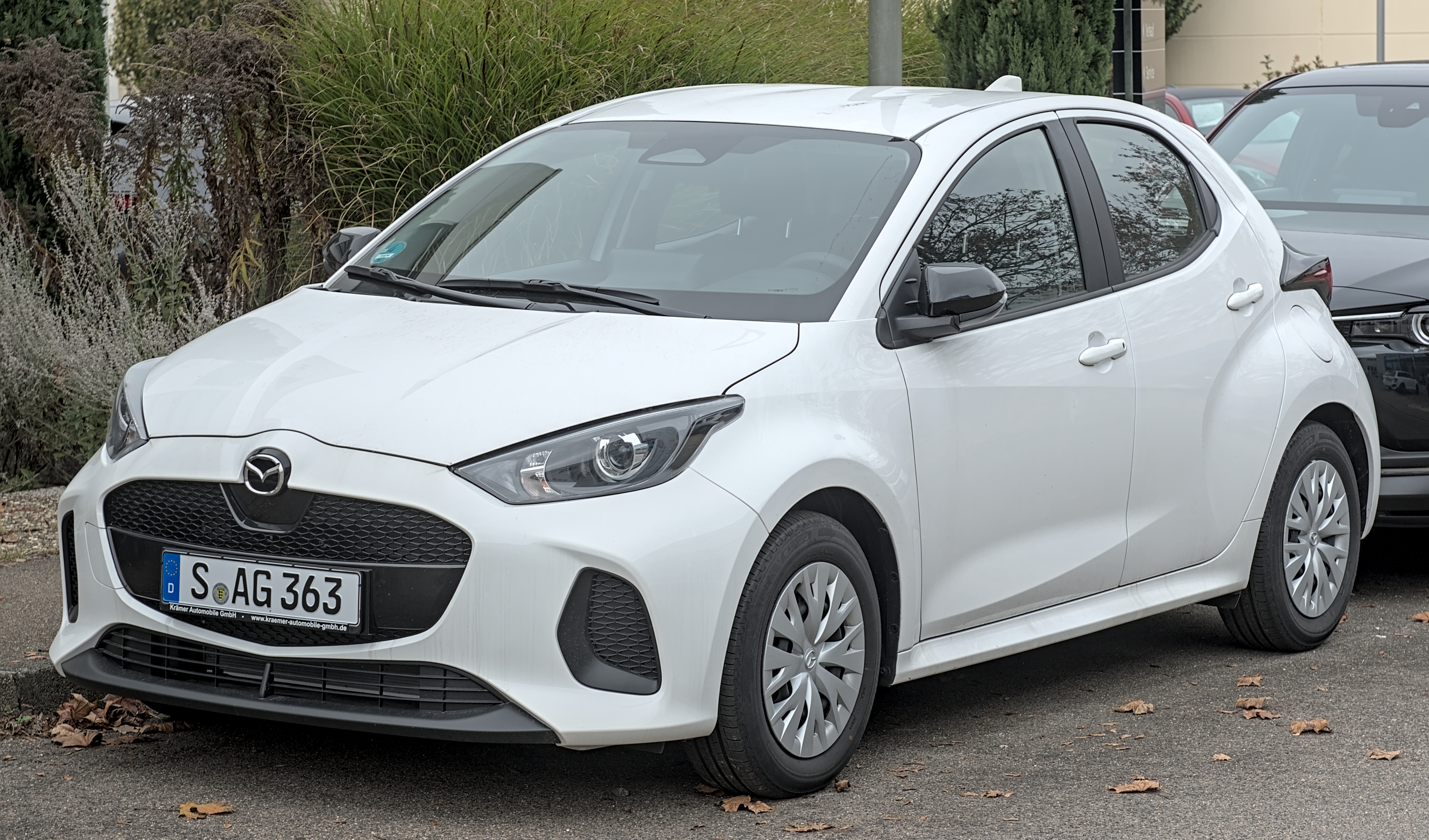
Mazda2 Hybrid (facelift)

The Mazda2 Hybrid based on the XP210 Toyota Yaris Hybrid entered production in December 2021 and went on sale in Europe starting 2022 alongside the older Mazda-built, regular gasoline-powered DJ model. It was updated in 2024.

== Sales ==
Year	Europe	Japan	Australia	Thailand	Mexico		U.S.	Canada	Colombia		China
Year	Europe	Japan	Australia	Thailand	Mazda2	Yaris-R	U.S.	Canada	Colombia	Vietnam	China
2008	72,638										
2009	75,425										
2010	52,838	65,949					3,021				13,692
2011	38,251	61,736			1,650		13,952				22,634
2012	30,023	57,820			2,626		22,016	4,935			21,680
2013	23,604	43,573			2,965		11,757	4,072			8,981
2014	24,289	48,564	13,424	6,801	2,256		13,615	2,449		823	3,049
2015	35,478	72,771	14,511	19,091	4,860	3,099	297	761		2,396	1,345
2016	36,463	57,320	13,639	23,223	3,812	6,729		27			996
2017	31,703	49,302	12,101	31,760	2,842	2,932				1,980	151
2018	32,246	48,182	9,542	45,972	7,959	2,259				2,669	
2019	37,346	11,172	8,198	41,987	8,802	1,122				2,662	
2020	16,402	21,309	3,790	21,813	4,309	408				2,779	
2021	18,339	24,652	4,183	19,388	5,055					3,247	
2022	24,502	24,429	5,146	16,249	10,965				4,162	3,904	
2023		20,706	5,181	7,834	20,104				5,204	4,019	
2024		21,649	5,365	4,666	21,921				3,774	5,092	
2025			4,346							5,465	
