= Mazda MX =

The name of Mazda MX may refer to:

- Mazda MX-3
- Mazda MX-5
- Mazda MX-6
- Mazda MX-30
