= Mazda CX-80 =

Mid-size crossover SUV

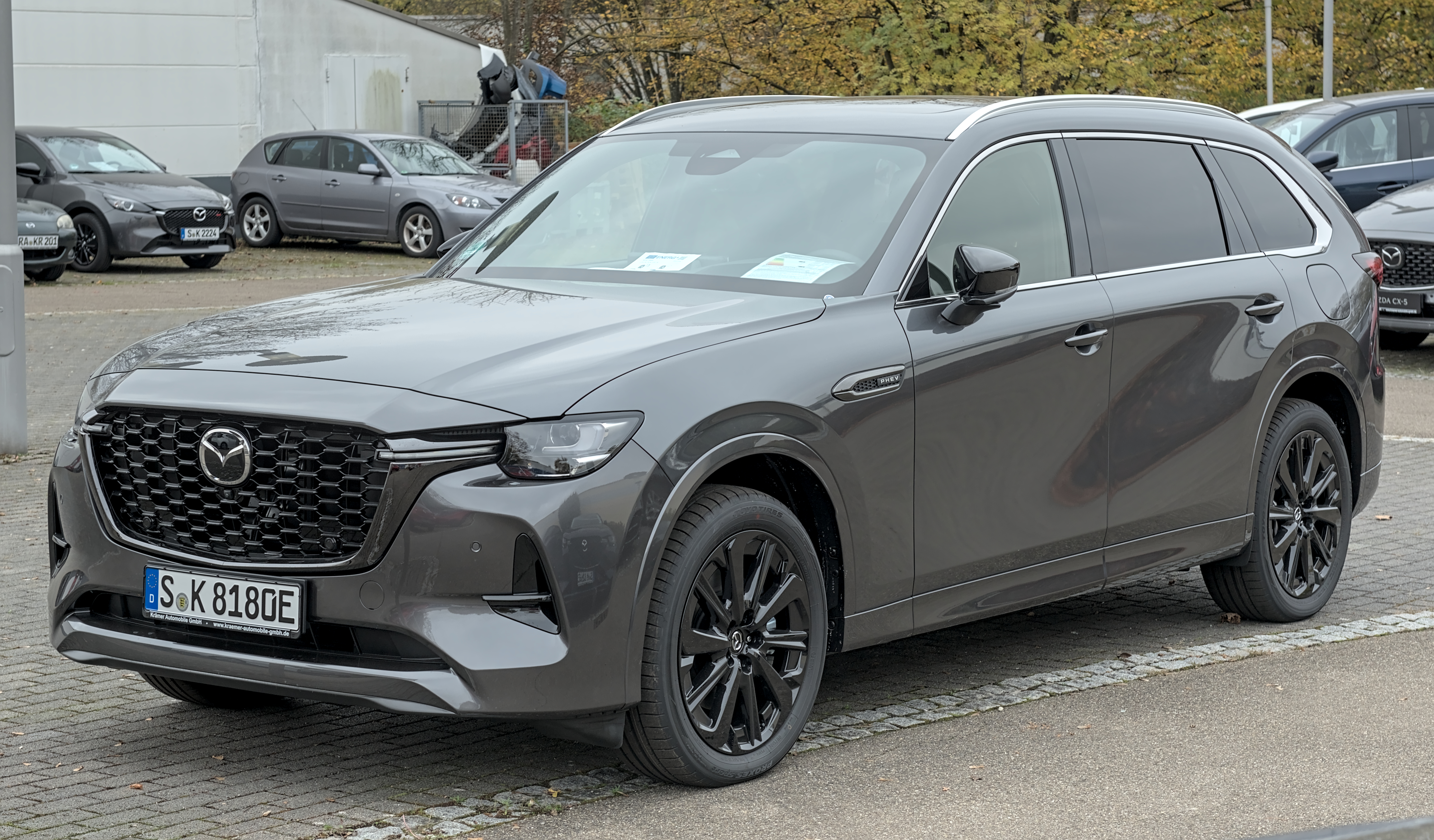
- 2024 Mazda CX-80 PHEV in Machine Grey

Overview
- Manufacturer: Mazda
- Model code: KL
- Production: 2024–present
- Assembly: Japan: Hōfu (Hōfu Plant No. 2)

Body and chassis
- Class: Mid-size crossover SUV
- Body style: 5-door SUV
- Layout: Front-engine, all-wheel-drive
- Platform: Large Product Group
- Related: Mazda CX-60; Mazda CX-70/CX-90

Powertrain
- Engine: Petrol: 3.3 L e-Skyactiv G H3T turbo I6; Petrol plug-in hybrid: (PHEV); 2.5 L e-Skyactiv PHEV PY-VPS I4; Diesel: 3.3 L e-Skyactiv D T3-VPTS turbo I6
- Electric motor: M Hybrid Boost integrated starter generator (mild hybrid); Synchronous, permanent magnet (PHEV)
- Transmission: 8-speed Skyactiv-Drive automatic
- Hybrid drivetrain: Mild hybrid; Plug-in hybrid
- Battery: 0.33 kWh (mild hybrid); 17.8 kWh lithium-ion (PHEV)
- Electric range: 60–61 km (37–38 mi) WLTP (PHEV)

Dimensions
- Wheelbase: 3,120 mm (122.8 in)
- Length: 4,995 mm (196.7 in)
- Width: 1,890 mm (74.4 in)
- Height: 1,710 mm (67.3 in)
- Kerb weight: 2,131–2,240 kg (4,698–4,938 lb)

Chronology
- Predecessor: Mazda CX-8 (Japan, Australia and New Zealand)

The Mazda CX-80 is a mid-size crossover SUV with three-row seating produced by the Japanese automaker Mazda since 2024. Based on the shorter, five-seater CX-60, the CX-80 is the fourth vehicle to use Mazda's rear- and all-wheel drive with longitudinal engine layout categorized as Large Product Group, with same powertrains found in the CX-60 including a plug-in hybrid.

The CX-80 is marketed in Japan, Europe, Australia, and Asia, while North America receives the wider-body CX-90. It is a flagship model in Europe and Japan, while in Australia and some Asian countries it is a smaller offering alongside the CX-90. It replaced the CX-8 in markets where it has been discontinued.

== History ==
The Mazda CX-80 was officially revealed on 18 April 2024, with pre-sales of the CX-80 set to commence in May 2024 and deliveries set to follow in the second half of the year.

== Design and equipment ==
The CX-80 shares the same front fascia from the CX-60. Other exterior differences compared to the CX-60 are stretched side windows with redesigned window mouldings, the addition of roof rails, and a redesigned rear bumper without the faux exhaust pieces which is hidden behind the bumper.

The interior of the CX-80 is similar to the CX-60 and has the same features, such as the Driver Personalisation System. The driver's cockpit features the three main displays: a full TFT-LCD driver's instrument cluster, a window head-up display (HUD) and a 12.3-inch Mazda Connect centre display can be operated only through a "command control'' knob. Other features found in the CX-80 are Hybrid Navigation combines both offline and online navigation, Alexa Voice Control, rear door sunshades (a first for a Mazda in Europe), and a Trailer Hitch View (debuted in the CX-80) which uses the reversing camera to make it convenient to attach a trailer.

The CX-80 has the option between the 7-seater and 6-seater configurations. The 6-seater configuration version replaces the second-row bench seat with individual captain seats, with the option to have either an open walk-through space or a centre console between the seats.

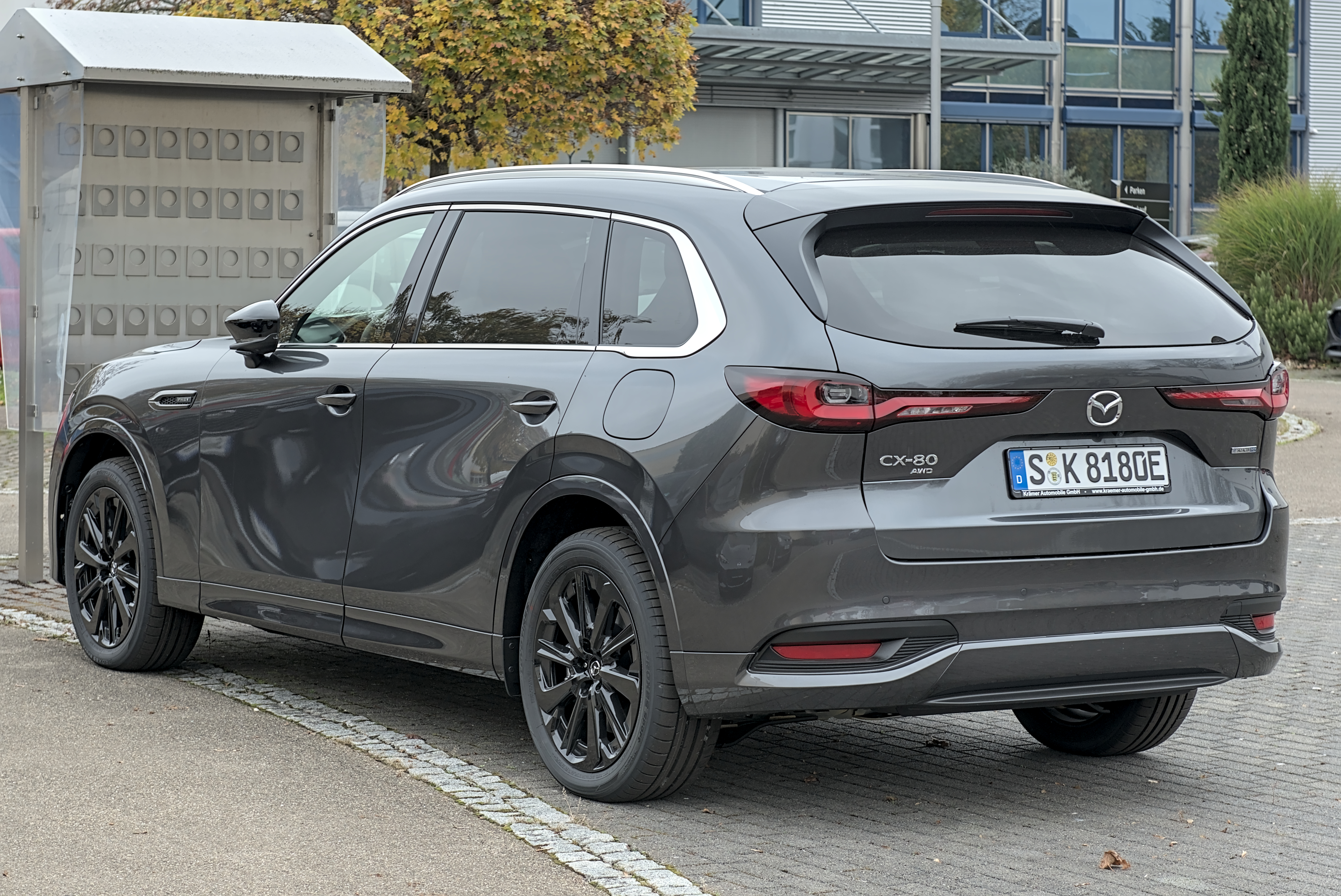
Rear view

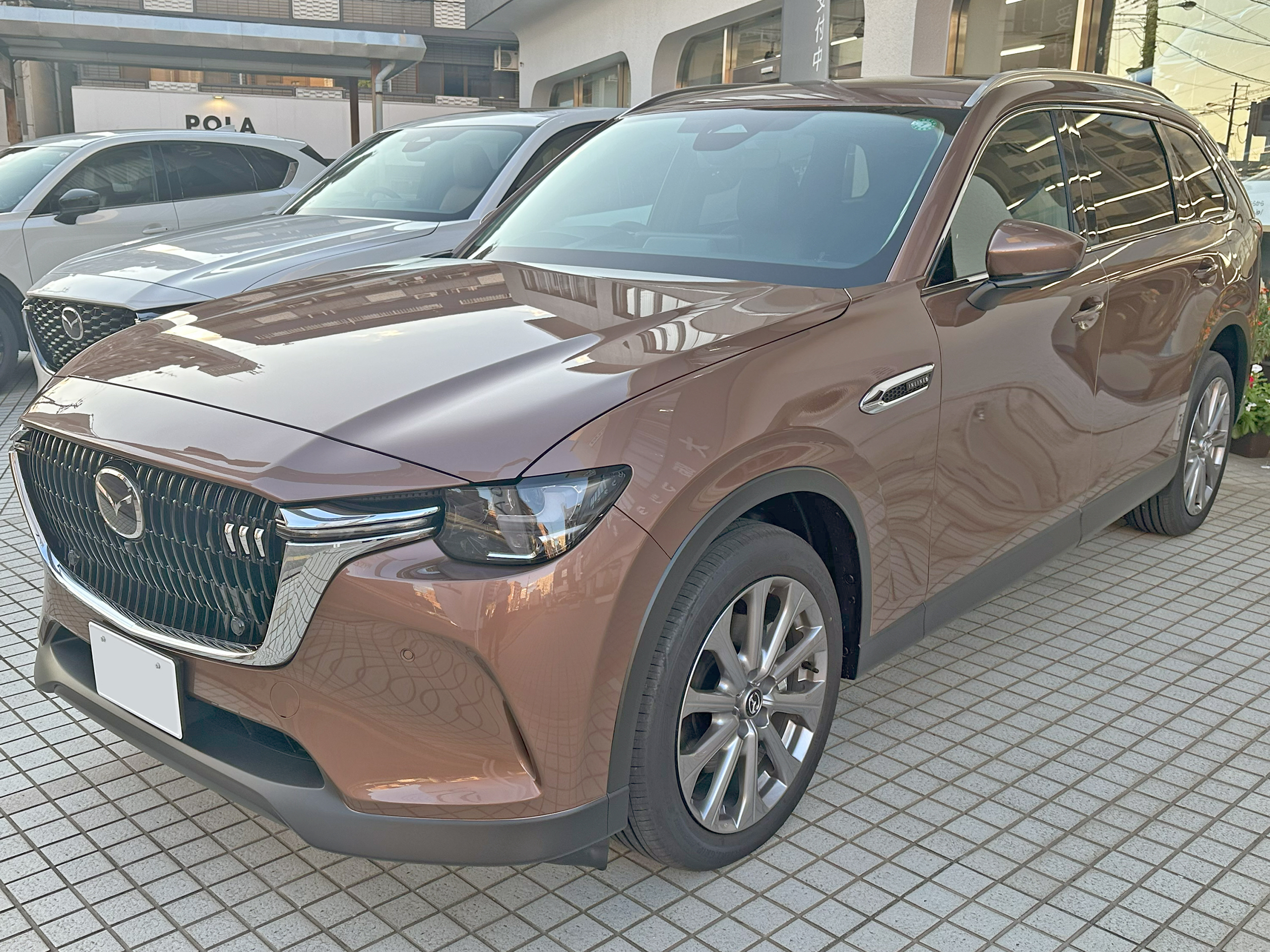
CX-80 PHEV L Package (Japan)

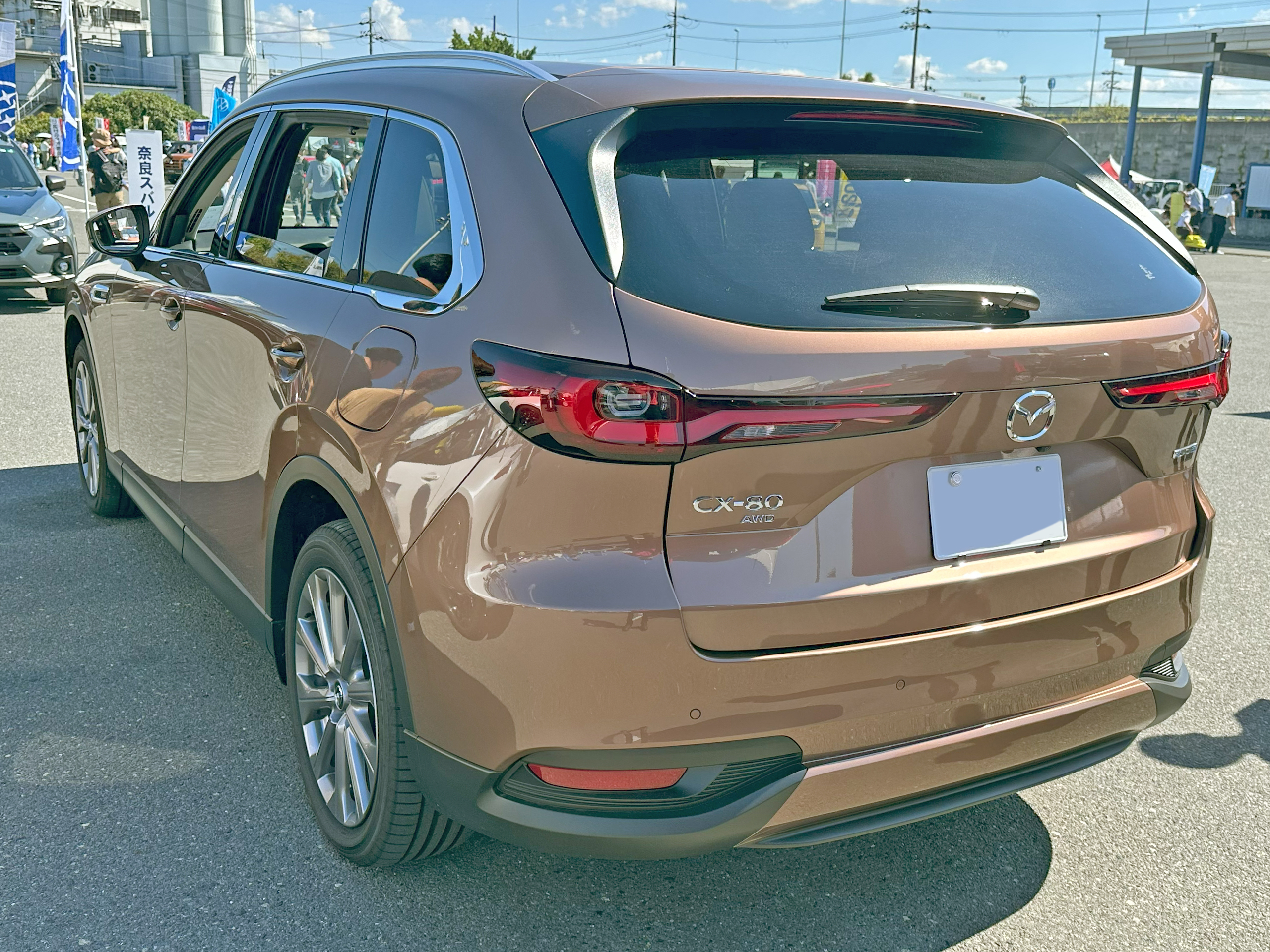
CX-80 PHEV L Package (Japan, rear view)

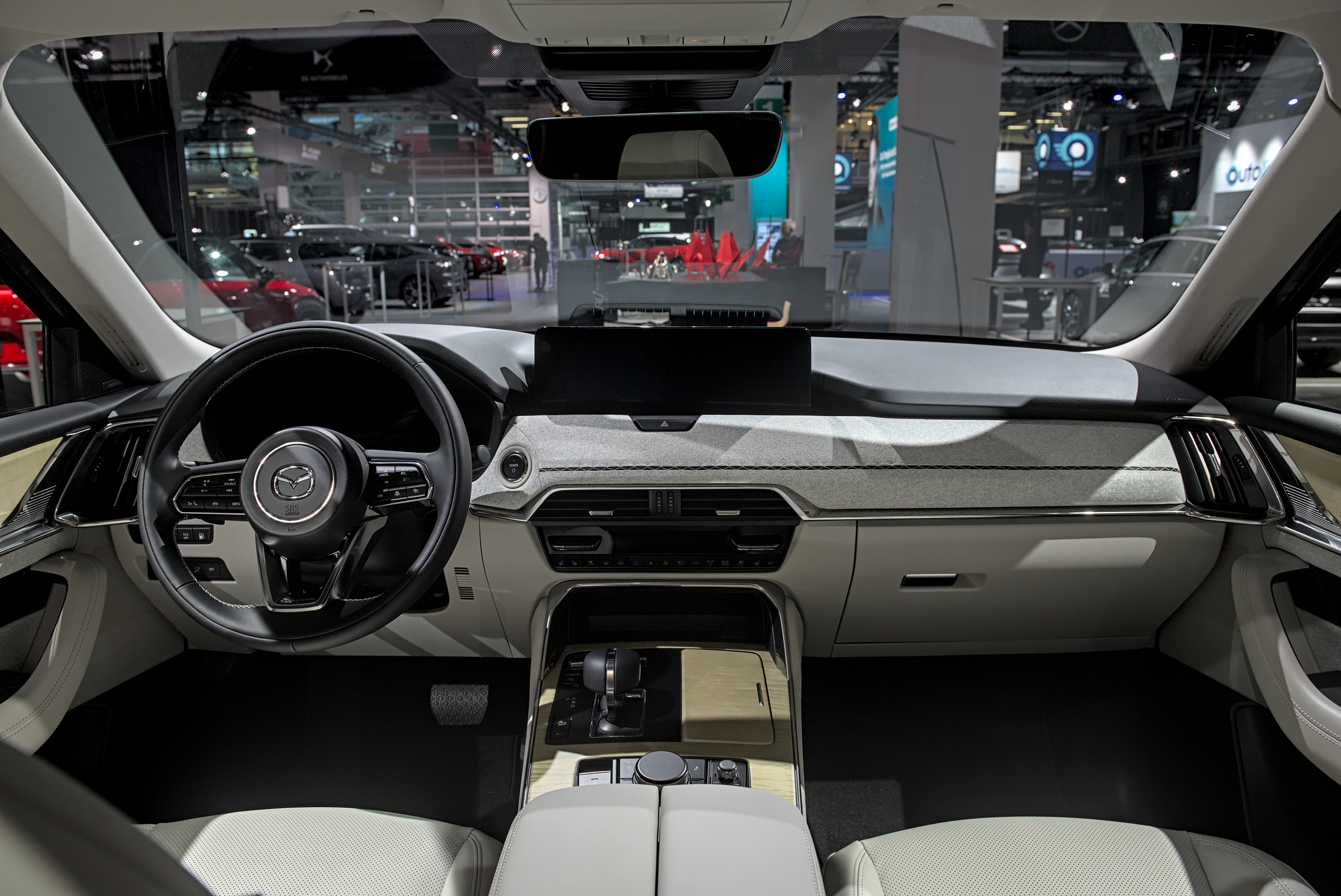
Interior

== Markets ==
=== Asia ===
==== Indonesia ====
The CX-80 was launched in Indonesia on 22 January 2025, with two trim levels: Elite Edition and Kuro Edition, it is powered by the e-Skyactiv PHEV 2.5-litre petrol plug-in hybrid powertrain.

==== Japan ====
The CX-80 in the Japanese market is offered with three powertrain options. These include the e-Skyactiv D 3.3-litre diesel, an e-Skyactiv D 3.3-litre diesel mild hybrid (XD-Hybrid), and a e-Skyactiv PHEV 2.5-litre petrol plug-in hybrid (PHEV). Two-wheel drive is available for the base diesel model (XD), while other variants come with all-wheel drive. The trim lineup includes base, S Package, L Package, and Premium trims, with exclusive features like Nappa leather interiors and advanced infotainment systems available on higher-end models.

==== Malaysia ====
The CX-80 was launched in Malaysia on 3 September 2025, alongside the CX-60, in the sole 2.5 PHEV AWD High Plus powered by the e-Skyactiv PHEV 2.5-litre petrol plug-in hybrid powertrain.

==== Philippines ====
The CX-80 was launched in the Philippines on 30 October 2026, with two trim levels: Premium and Exclusive, powered by the e-Skyactiv PHEV 2.5-litre petrol plug-in hybrid powertrain.

=== Europe ===
The CX-80 was released in Europe in early 2025, with five grades: Exclusive Line, Homura, Takumi, Homura Plus and Takumi Plus. For Europe, it is available with either a e-Skyactiv D 3.3-litre diesel mild hybrid and e-Skyactiv PHEV 2.5-litre petrol plug-in hybrid.

=== Oceania ===
==== Australia ====
The CX-80 was launched in Australia on 12 November 2024, with four trim levels: Pure, Touring, GT and Azami. It is available with three powertrains: e-Skyactiv G 3.3-litre petrol mild hybrid (G40e), e-Skyactiv D 3.3-litre diesel mild hybrid (D50e) and e-Skyactiv PHEV 2.5-litre petrol plug-in hybrid (P50e).

==== New Zealand ====
The CX-80 was launched in New Zealand on 22 October 2024, with three variants: SP Hybrid, SP Plug-in Hybrid and Homura Plug-in Hybrid. It is available with two powertrains: e-Skyactiv G 3.3-litre petrol mild hybrid and e-Skyactiv PHEV 2.5-litre petrol plug-in hybrid. The Homura Hybrid variant was added in June 2025.

== Safety ==
Euro NCAP test results Mazda CX-80 2.5 PHEV (LHD) (2024)
Test	Points	%
Overall:	5 /5 stars	
Adult occupant:	37.2	92%
Child occupant:	43.2	88%
Pedestrian:	53.3	84%
Safety assist:	14.3	79%

ANCAP test results Mazda CX-80 (2024, aligned with Euro NCAP)
Test	Points	%
Overall:	5 /5 stars	
Adult occupant:	37.18	92%
Child occupant:	43	87%
Pedestrian:	53.33	84%
Safety assist:	15.06	83%

== Sales ==
Year	Japan
2024	1,258
