= Mazda CX-8 =

Mid-size crossover SUV

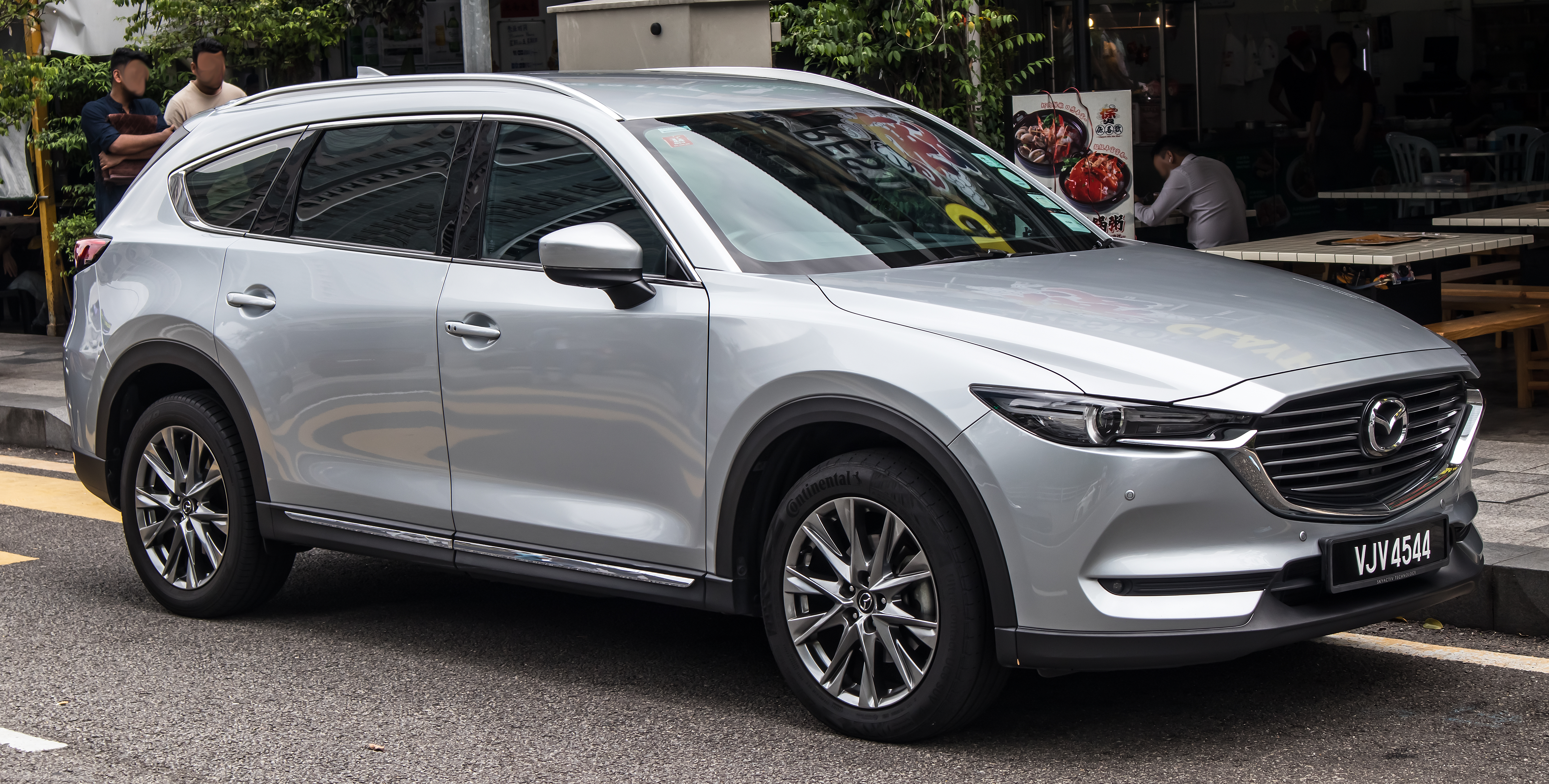
- CX-8 Skyactiv-D 2.2 (pre-facelift)

Overview
- Manufacturer: Mazda
- Model code: KG
- Production: December 2017–December 2023 (Japan); 2019–present (Southeast Asia)
- Assembly: Japan: Hiroshima (Ujina Plant No. 2; 2017–2023); China: Nanjing (Changan Mazda); Malaysia: Kulim, Kedah (Inokom); Vietnam: Chu Lai, Quảng Nam (THACO Auto)
- Designer: Yuki Harada

Body and chassis
- Class: Mid-size crossover SUV
- Body style: 5-door SUV
- Layout: Front-engine, front-wheel-drive; Front-engine, four-wheel-drive
- Related: Mazda CX-5 (KF); Mazda CX-9 (TC)

Powertrain
- Engine: Petrol: 2.5 L Skyactiv-G (PY-VPS) I4; 2.5 L Skyactiv-G (PY-VPTS) I4-T; Diesel: 2.2 L Skyactiv-D (SH-VPTS) I4-T
- Power output: 140 kW (188 hp; 190 PS) (2.5 L; naturally aspirated); 169 kW (227 hp; 230 PS) (2.5 L; turbocharged); 140–147 kW (188–197 hp; 190–200 PS) (2.2 L; diesel)
- Transmission: 6-speed Skyactiv-Drive automatic

Dimensions
- Wheelbase: 2,930 mm (115.4 in)
- Length: 4,900 mm (192.9 in); 4,925 mm (193.9 in) (facelift)
- Width: 1,840 mm (72.4 in)
- Height: 1,730 mm (68.1 in)
- Curb weight: 1,710–1,920 kg (3,770–4,233 lb)

Chronology
- Successor: Mazda CX-80 (Japan, Australia and New Zealand)

The Mazda CX-8 is a mid-size crossover SUV produced by Mazda since the end of 2017. It is a three-row version of the CX-5. The CX-8 was Mazda's flagship SUV in Japan, as the larger, export-only CX-9 is not sold in the country. Outside of Japan, the CX-8 is available in China, Oceania, and Southeast Asia.

== Overview ==
First unveiled on 14 September 2017 in Japan, the CX-8 is the only three-row SUV offered in the country, and became the only three-row vehicle offered by the company following the discontinuation of Mazda minivans such as the Biante and Premacy.

While bearing resemblance to the second generation CX-9, and sharing the same outer tail lights, the CX-8 is 17 cm (6.7 in) shorter in length and 13 cm (5.1 in) narrower in width to conform to Japanese conditions. Within a few weeks after its introduction in Japan, Mazda dealers received over 12,000 orders from consumers in Japan.

Initially announced as a Japan-exclusive model, Mazda introduced the vehicle in Australia in July 2018 and positioning it below the slightly larger CX-9. Unlike the CX-9, the CX-8 is available with a diesel engine option. It is also assembled and marketed in Malaysia since late 2019, also for exports to several Southeast Asian countries.

Offered with three-row seating, it is available in a seven-seater configuration with second row bench seat, and a six-seater configuration where the second row consists of captain seats with a center console as an armrest, storage and includes cup holders. With the third row seats in place, the CX-8 offers 209 litres (7.38 cu ft) of luggage space.

The CX-8 was initially offered only with a 2.2 L Skyactiv-D diesel engine, but a choice of two I4 petrol engines was added in 2018: a 2.5 L Skyactiv-G (PY-VPS) from the CX-5 and a turbocharged version of the same engine from the CX-9.

In October 2023, Mazda announced Japanese production of the CX-8 would end at the end of the year. It will be discontinued in Japan, Australia and New Zealand once stock is depleted. The Mazda CX-80, set to be debuted in 2024, will serve as its direct replacement. Production of the CX-8 in Malaysia is unaffected, and will continue until at least 2026.

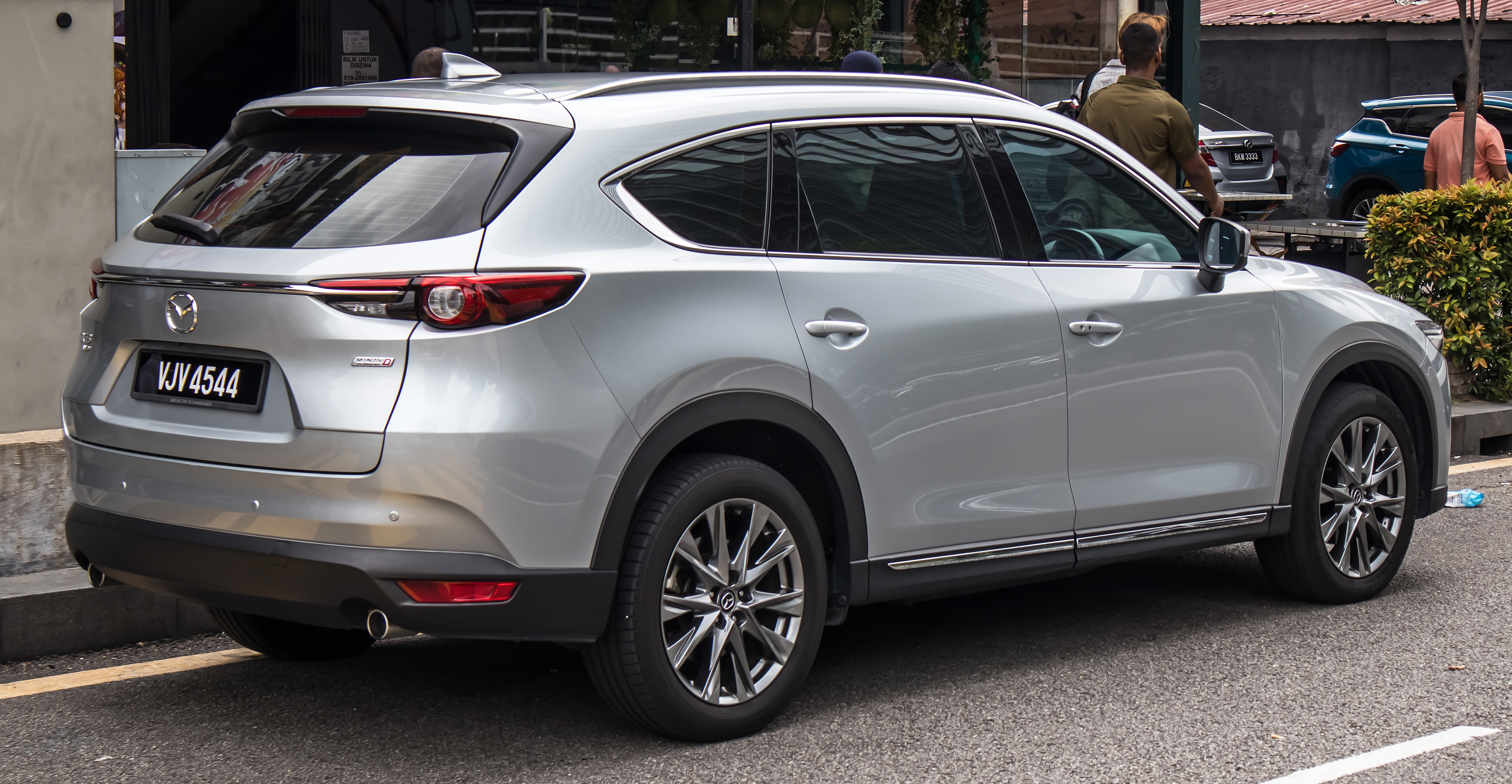
Rear view (pre-facelift)

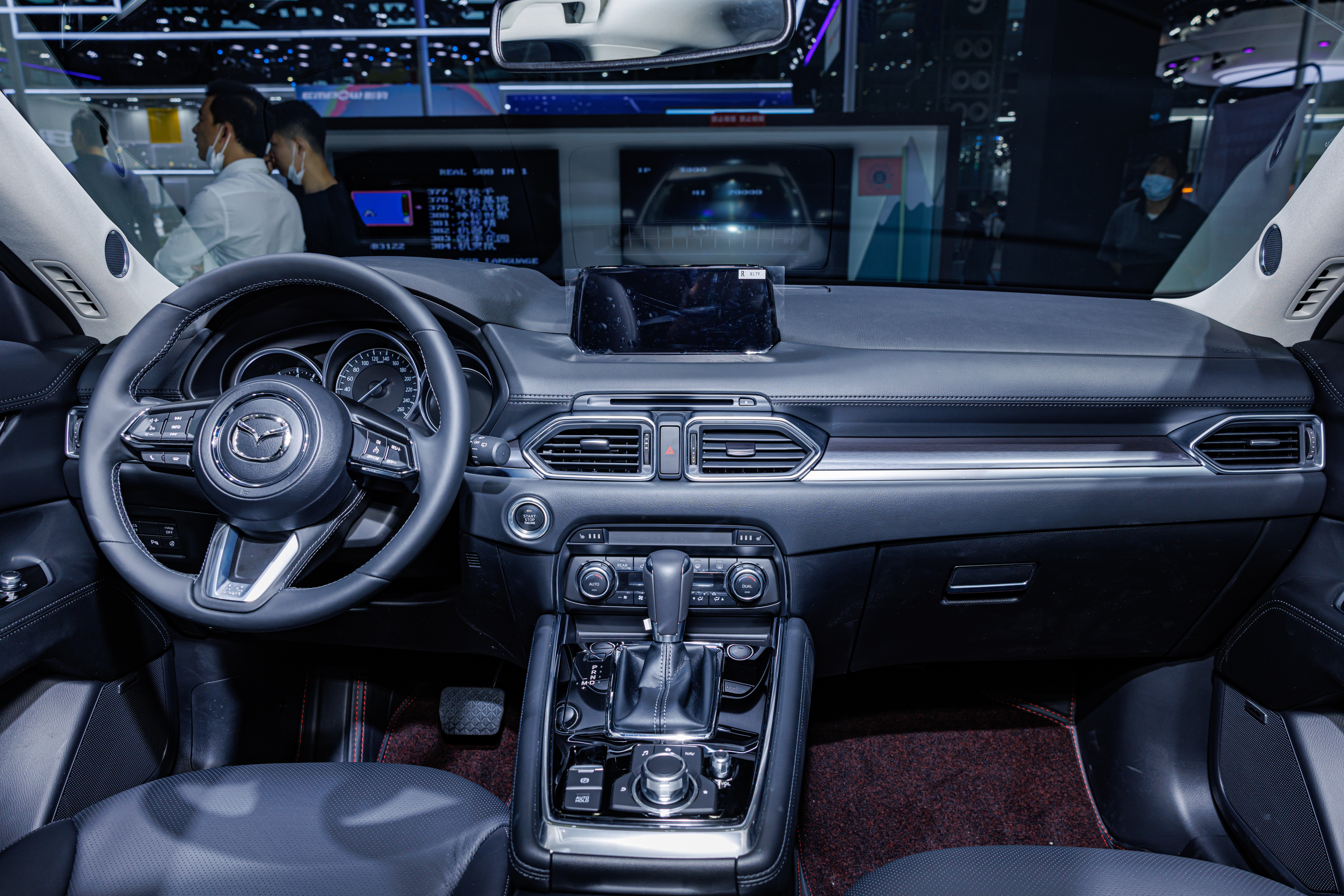
Interior

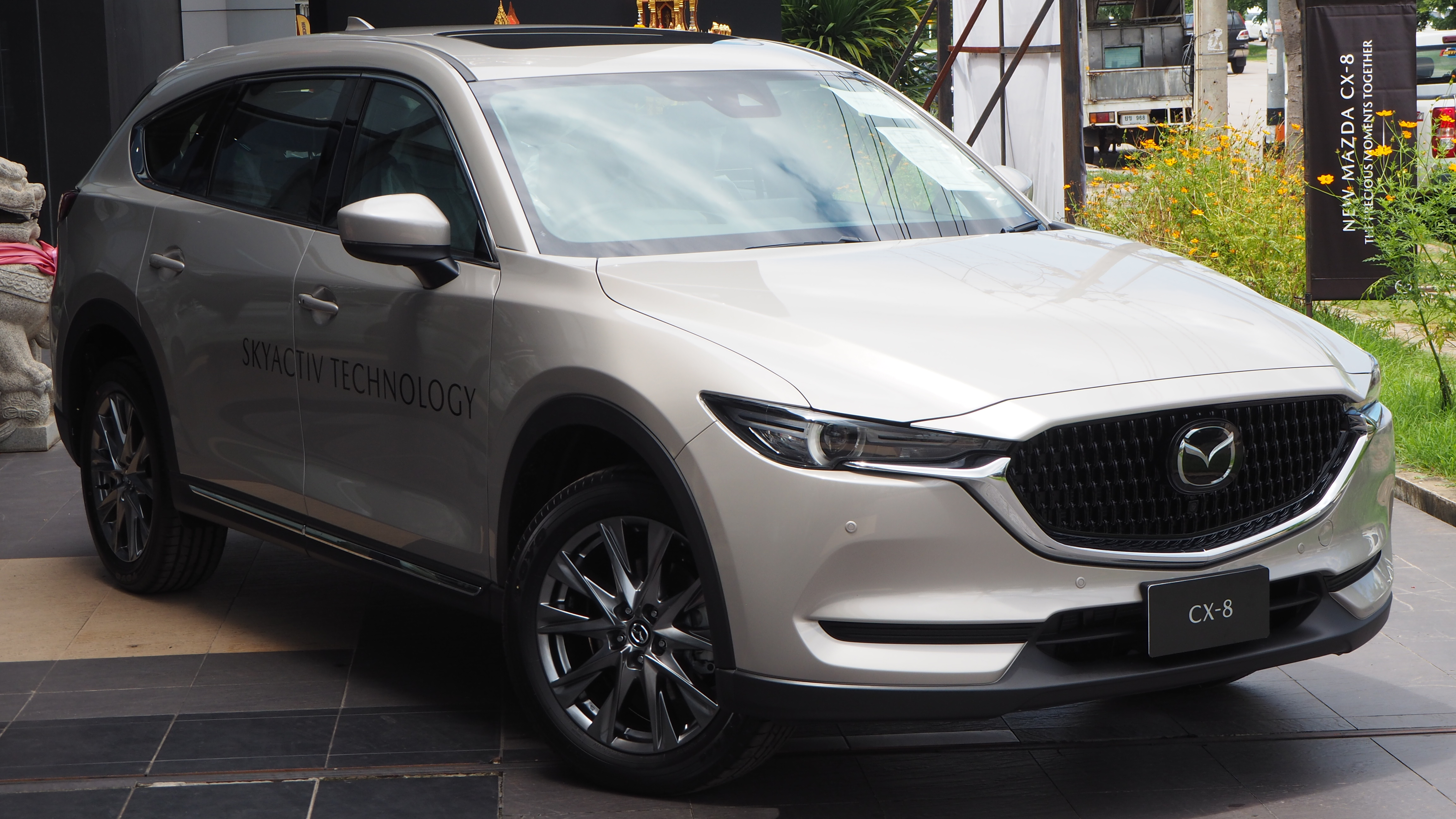
2021 refresh

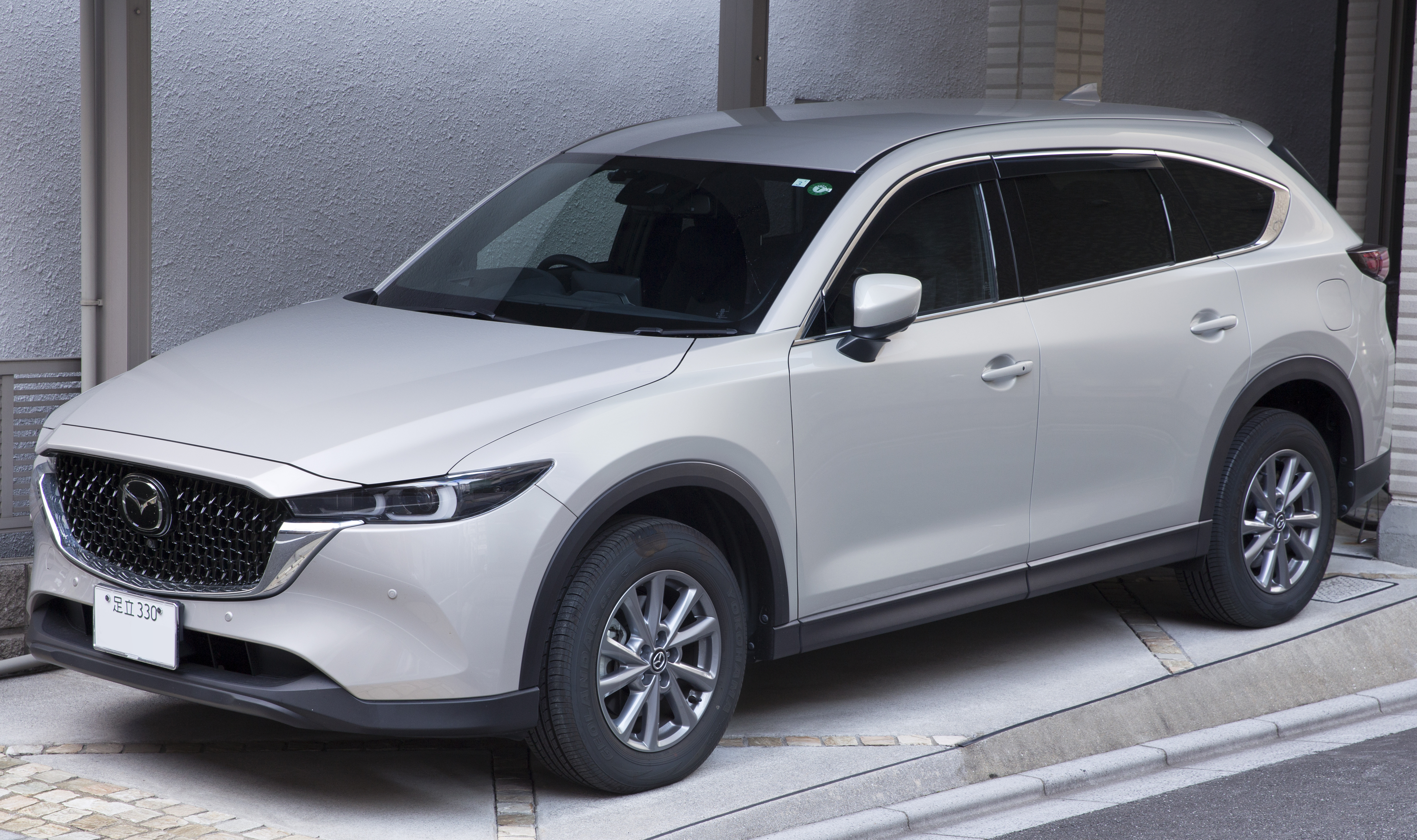
2022 facelift

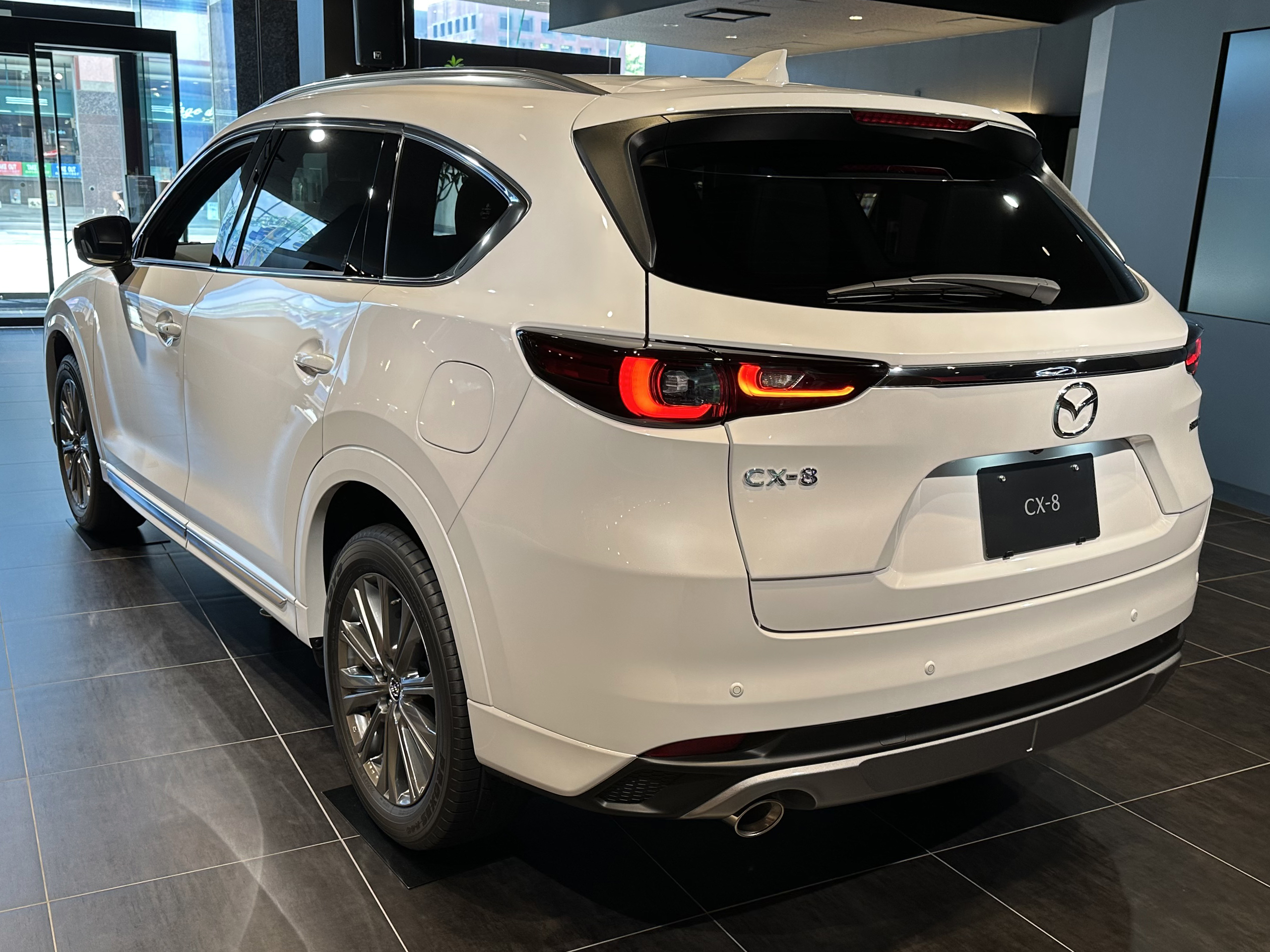
2022 facelift; rear

== Reception ==
Marton Pettendy of Australian publication Motoring gave the CX-8 a rating of 84 out of 100, praising the quality and refinement, performance and economy, and diesel power for less than the CX-9, but criticizing the tight rear head/leg room, sub par warranty and service intervals, and the lack of a spare tire and CarPlay.

Malcolm Flynn of Australian publication CarsGuide rated the car 8.1. out of 10, praising its ease of parking compared to the CX-9, more useful boot space than the CX-5, and its comfortable ride, but criticising its lack of a petrol engine and CarPlay, and the steep price jump between the Sport and Asaki trims.

Paul Maric of Australian publication CarAdvice gave the car a rating of 7.9 out of 10, calling it a "compelling proposition for families that need the extra space of an occasional third row and the fuel economy of a diesel engine."

== Safety ==
ANCAP test results* Mazda CX-8 all variants (2018, aligned with Euro NCAP)
Test	Points	%
Overall:	5 /5 stars	
Adult occupant:	36.6	96%
Child occupant:	42.6	87%
Pedestrian:	34.8	72%
Safety assist:	9.5	73%

== Markets ==
=== Japan ===
After its world premiere in Japan, the CX-8 was released in Japan on 14 December 2017. At launch, three variants were available: XD, XD Proactive, and XD L Package. All grades have the option between 6 or 7-seater configurations. All variants are powered by a 2.2 Skyactiv-D diesel engine and each grade has option between front-wheel-drive and all-wheel-drive.

In November 2018, five variants were added: 25S, 25S Proactive, 25S L Package, 25T Proactive and 25T L Package. The 25S uses a 2.5 Skyactiv-G petrol engine (front-wheel-drive) and the 25T uses a 2.5T Skyactiv-G petrol engine (all-wheel-drive). The XD 2WD variant was discontinued it became solely available with all-wheel-drive.

In November 2019, a special edition Exclusive Mode grade was added for the 25T and XD engines. The XD Proactive S Package variant was added and the XD AWD variant was discontinued.

In November 2022, finally Mazda refreshed the CX-8 and there are two new design schemes available: Grand Journey which has silver bash plates and black mirror shells to hint at the car's off-road potential, and a Sports Appearance package that has red or black leather seats, and blacks out the grille, body cladding, mirrors and wheels. Top-shelf Exclusive Mode variants now feature body-colour wheel arches and lower body cladding.

In December 2023, Mazda ended production of the CX-8 in Japan and it was removed from the Mazda Japan website the same month.

=== Australia ===
The CX-8 went on sale in Australia on 1 July 2018, in two grades: Sport and Asaki. It is powered by a 2.2-litre Skyactiv-D diesel engine. AWD system is optional on the Sport grade and standard on the Asaki grade.

In March 2020, two new grades for the CX-8 range was added: Touring and GT. The 2.5 Skyactiv-G petrol engine was added as the base engine option below the 2.2 Skyactiv-D diesel, comes only as front wheel drive.

In March 2021, two new grades were added: Touring SP and Asaki LE (6-seats). The latter grade is only available with a diesel engine.

In January 2022, the CX-8 range was simplified by Mazda adding more petrol variants and discontinued diesel FWD variants, as over 70% of customers choose the petrol engine option.

In May 2023, the facelifted CX-8 range debuted in Australia, with 6 grades available at launch: Sport, Touring, Touring Active, GT SP (replaced both the Touring SP and GT grades), Asaki, and Asaki LE. Engine options remain the same, the 2.5 Skyactiv-G badged as G25 and the 2.2 Skyactiv-D badged as D35, all wheel drive comes standard only for diesel engine option.

In October 2023, Mazda Australia announced the CX-8 would be discontinued, with Japanese production to cease at the end of the year. Around 25,000 examples of the CX-8 have been sold in Australia since it launched in mid-2018. In Australia, the CX-8 will be replaced by the CX-80 three-row SUV set to debut in 2024.

=== New Zealand ===
The CX-8 was launched in New Zealand on 20 June 2018, with 2 grades available at launch: GSX and Limited. It is powered only by a 2.2-litre Skyactiv-D diesel engine, with an AWD option available for both grades.

An updated CX-8 range went on sale in May 2019, with two grades available: GSX and Takami. The model series received a mild facelift in February 2023 for the Takami edition with the introduction of:

- New silver mesh design radiator grille
- Black leather seats (previously wine red colored)
- Paddle shift gear control
- Glass sunroof power sliding and tilt
- Larger 10.25-inch widescreen colour display infotainment screen
- Mazda Mi-Drive system with off-road capability for unsurfaced roads, and snowy conditions.
- Body coloured wheel arches and bumper mouldings

It is still powered by the 2.2-litre Skyactiv-D diesel engine.

=== Vietnam ===
The CX-8 was launched in Vietnam on 23 June 2019, with 3 grades: Deluxe, Luxury, and Premium. All grades are powered by a 2.5 Skyactiv-G petrol, and an AWD option is available for the Premium grade. It is locally assembled at Truong Hai Auto Corporation plant in Quảng Nam Province.

=== Malaysia ===
The CX-8 went on sale in Malaysia in November 2019, with 4 variants available at launch: 2.5 Mid 2WD, 2.5 Mid Plus 2WD, 2.5 High 2WD, and 2.2D High AWD.

In June 2022, the trims for the updated CX-8 have been revised, variants consists of: 2.5 Mid 2WD (7-seater), 2.5 High 2WD (6-seater), 2.5 High Plus 2WD (6-seater) and a new 2.5T High Plus AWD (6-seater).The AWD system on 2.2D High Plus trim had dropped and now only available as 2WD.

=== Thailand ===
The CX-8 was launched in Thailand on 14 November 2019, sourced from Malaysia, with 4 variants available at launch: 2.5 S, 2.5 SP, XDL, and the XDL Exclusive. All variants comes with 7-seats. The '2.5' variants are powered by a 2.5 Skyactiv-G petrol and the XD' variants are powered by a 2.2 Skyactiv-D diesel, all wheel drive is standard on the top variant.

In October 2021, a new variant 2.5 SP Exclusive (6-seater) is released.

=== Indonesia ===
The CX-8 was launched in Indonesia on 22 November 2019, with 2 grades available at launch: Touring and Elite. The former grade is a 7-seater, and the latter grade is a 6-seater. Both grades are powered by a 2.5 Skyactiv-G petrol.

=== Philippines ===
The CX-8 was launched alongside the Mazda CX-30 on 28 November 2019, it is offered in two grades: Signature and Exclusive; it is powered by a 2.5 Skyactiv-G petrol engine. The former grade has a seven-seat configuration and comes only in front-wheel drive, while the latter comes with a seven-seat configuration and comes only with all-wheel drive.

=== Singapore ===
The CX-8 was launched in Singapore by Eurokars on 16 October 2020, with 2 grades available: Elegance and Luxury, it is powered by a 2.5-litre Skyactiv-G petrol engine. The Elegance grade comes only with 7 seaters, and the Luxury grade has the option between 6 or 7 seats.

== Sales ==
Year	Japan	Australia	China	Thailand	Vietnam	Malaysia	Indonesia
2017	2,081						
2018	30,701		992				
2019	23,294	2,551	1,476	745	1,234	250	63
2020	14,047	3,738	672	2,139	4,885	1,796	218
2021	16,596	6,119	1,127	1,468	2,307	1,399	216
2022	12,934	5,932	1,227	1,157	3,837	1,959	221
2023	17,181	5,409	780	999	3,024	2,029	256
2024	936	2,647	—	342	2,693	1,443	155
