= Skyactiv =

Mazda motor vehicle engine

- Mazda Skyactiv logo from 2011 to 2019

Overview
- Manufacturer: Mazda

Skyactiv (styled as SKYACTIV) is a brand name for a series of automobile technologies developed by Mazda to increase fuel efficiency and engine output. The initial announcement of the Skyactiv technologies included new engines, but has grown to include transmissions, as well as complete vehicle platforms, which have appeared in Mazda vehicles from 2011 onwards.

== The Mazda Sky concept ==
The precursor of Skyactiv, which featured a Mazda Sky-G 2.3-liter gasoline direct injection engine, a Mazda Sky-D 2.2-liter diesel engine, a Sky-Drive automatic transmission, a Mazda Kiyora with Sky-G 1.3 engine and Sky-Drive automatic transmission, was unveiled at the 40th Tokyo Motor Show in 2008. The Skyactiv concept features a revised suspension geometry, improved automatic and manual transmission, and various improvements to Mazda's L- engine such as direct injection, upgraded exhaust manifold, increased compression ratio for cleaner burn and higher thermal efficiency, among other improvements. Mazda's previous chassis for the Mazda3 and Mazda6 were carried over to the new vehicles.

== Skyactiv-G ==
Skyactiv-G
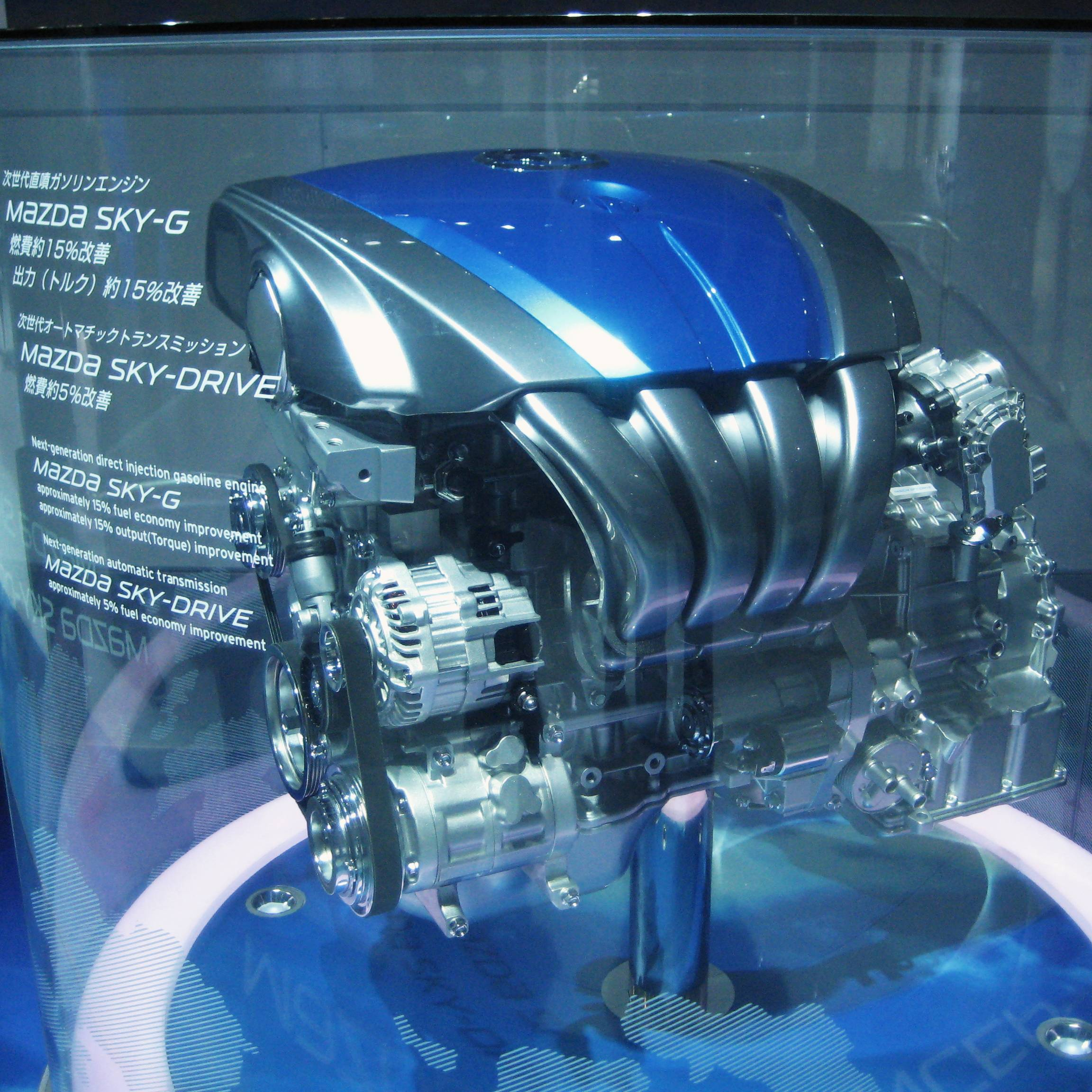

Overview
- Also called: Sky-G; Mazda P engine
- Production: 2012 – present

Layout
- Configuration: Inline-four; Inline-six
- Displacement: 1,298 cc (79.2 cu in); 1,496 cc (91.3 cu in); 1,998 cc (121.9 cu in); 2,488 cc (151.8 cu in); 3,283 cc (200.3 cu in)
- Cylinder bore: 71.0 mm (2.80 in); 74.5 mm (2.93 in); 83.5 mm (3.29 in); 86.0 mm (3.39 in); 89.0 mm (3.50 in)
- Piston stroke: 82.0 mm (3.23 in); 85.8 mm (3.38 in); 91.2 mm (3.59 in); 94.2 mm (3.71 in); 100.0 mm (3.94 in)
- Cylinder block material: Aluminum
- Cylinder head material: Aluminum
- Valvetrain: DOHC
- Compression ratio: 10.5:1; 12:1; 13:1; 14:1

Combustion
- Turbocharger: Single with dynamic pressure anti-lag device and air-to-air or air-to-liquid intercooler (PY-VPTS)
- Fuel system: Gasoline direct injection
- Fuel type: Gasoline; Gasoline flex-fuel; Gasoline hybrid
- Oil system: Wet sump
- Cooling system: Water-cooled

Chronology
- Predecessor: Mazda Z engine; Mazda L engine

The Skyactiv-G is a family of gasoline engines (the "G" suffix indicates gasoline) featuring gasoline direct injection and high compression ratios. Engines in the family have a compression ratio of up to 14:1, except in the United States where it is 13:1 to allow the use of regular gasoline; the lower compression reduces torque and fuel economy by 3 to 5 percent. To suppress engine knock at high compression, residual gas is reduced using a 4-2-1 exhaust system, optimized piston cavities, and fuel injection control. Combustion duration is shortened by increasing airflow, raising injection pressure, and using multi-hole injectors.

Skyactiv-G engines use all-aluminum construction with chain-driven dual overhead camshafts, variable valve timing, and meet U.S. ULEV emission standards.

=== 1.3 L ===
The Skyactiv-G 1.3 (engine code P3-VPS) is a 1,298 cc (79.2 cu in) naturally aspirated, inline-four engine with a 71 mm (2.8 in) bore and a 82 mm (3.2 in) stroke. It was unveiled at the 2011 Automotive Engineering Exposition.

Five Mazda engineers were awarded the 2011 Japan Society of Mechanical Engineers Medal on 20 April 2012 for their work on this engine.

It was first used in the Mazda Demio/Mazda2, the only Skyactiv engine paired with a CVT. The engine produces 62 kW (83 hp) of power and 113 N⋅m (83 lb⋅ft) of torque.

Applications:

- 2011–present Mazda2/Mazda Demio

=== 1.5 L ===
The Skyactiv-G 1.5 (engine codes P5-VP (RS) for RWD and P5 VPS F-P5 for FWD) is a 1,496 cc (91.3 cu in) naturally aspirated inline-four with a 74.5 mm (2.93 in) bore and 85.8 mm (3.38 in) stroke. Introduced in the 2014 Mazda3 for Asian and European markets, it produces 85 kW (114 hp) of power at 6,000 rpm and 150 N⋅m (111 lb⋅ft) of torque at 4,000 rpm. The engine significantly improved performance and fuel economy compared with the previous MZR 1.5 engine.

Applications:

- 2014–present Mazda Axela/Mazda3
- 2014–present Mazda Demio/Mazda2
- 2016–present Mazda Roadster/MX-5
- 2016–present Mazda2/Mazda Demio/Scion iA/Toyota Yaris iA/Toyota Yaris
- 2020–present Mazda CX-3

=== 2.0 L ===
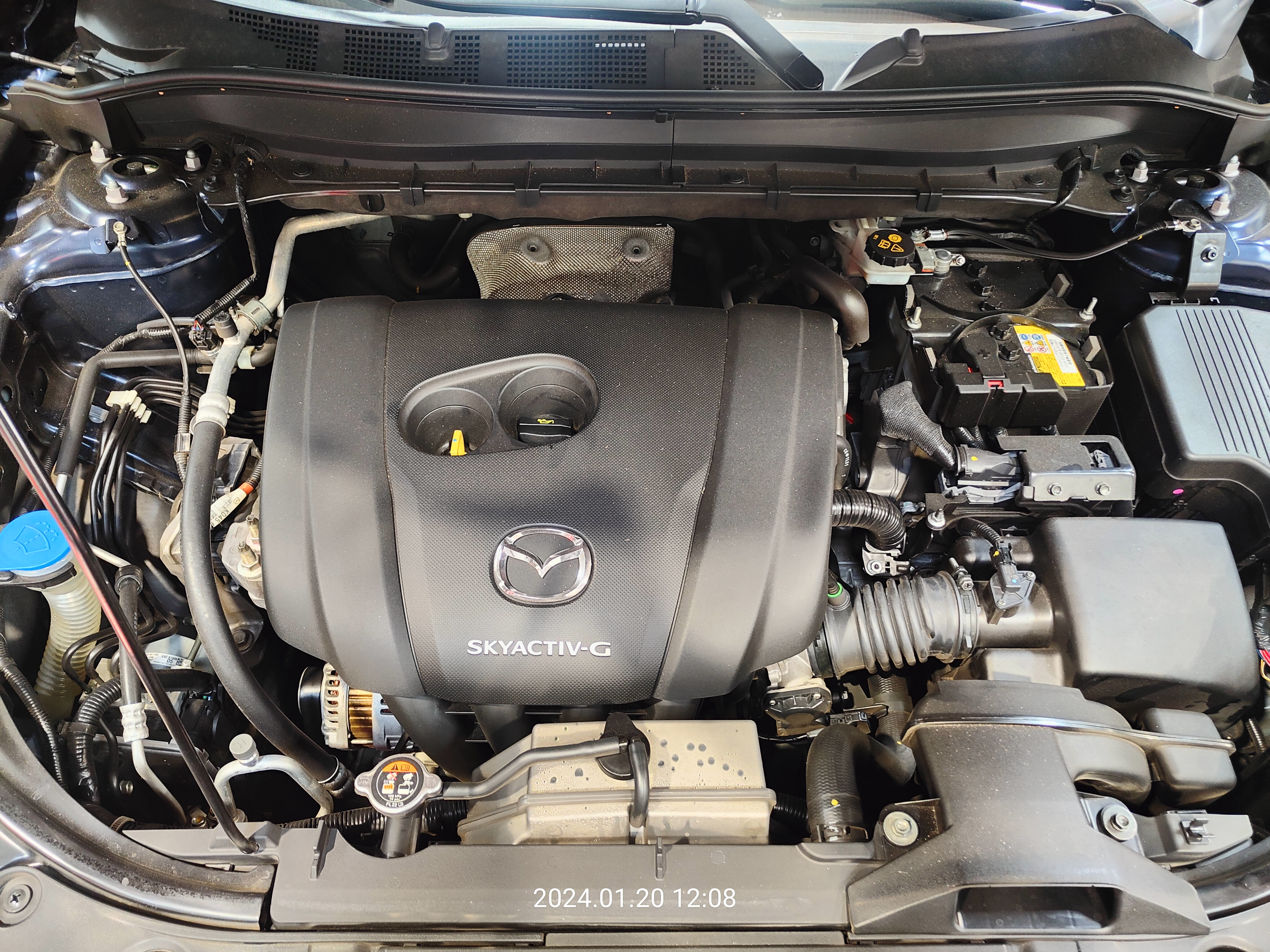
Skyactiv-G 2.0

The Skyactiv-G 2.0 (engine code PE-VPS) is a 1,998 cc (121.9 cu in) naturally aspirated inline-four engine. It has an 83.5 mm (3.29 in) bore and a 91.2 mm (3.59 in) stroke.

In the United States, the engine has a 13:1 compression ratio that produces 116 kW (155 hp) of power at 6,000 rpm and 200 N⋅m (148 lbf⋅ft) of torque at 4,600 rpm. A flexible-fuel variant increases output to 121 kW (162 hp) and 210 N⋅m (155 lbf⋅ft) when running on E85 fuel.

Compared with the previous engine in the 2011 Mazda3 (with an automatic transmission), fuel economy improved from 10.2 to 8.4 L/100 km (23 to 28 mpg_{‑US}) in city driving, and from 7.1 to 5.8 L/100 km (33 to 41 mpg_{‑US}) on the highway.

Applications:

- 2012–present Mazda Axela/Mazda3
- 2013–2025 Mazda Atenza/Mazda6
- 2013–present Mazda CX-5
- 2013–2018 Mazda Biante
- 2013–2015 Mazda Premacy/Mazda5
- 2015–present Mazda CX-3
- 2016–present Mazda Roadster/MX-5
- 2016–2024 Mazda CX-4 (China)
- 2019–present Mazda CX-30
- 2023–present Mazda CX-50 (China)
- 2024–present Mazda2/Mazda Demio

=== 2.5 L ===
The Skyactiv-G 2.5 (engine code PY-VPS) is a 2,488 cc (151.8 cu in) naturally aspirated inline-four engine introduced in the 2013 Mazda 6. It has an 89.0 mm (3.50 in) bore and a 100.0 mm (3.94 in) stroke.

In the United States, the 13:1 compression version produces 139 kW (187 hp) of power at 6,000 rpm and 252 N⋅m (186 lb⋅ft) of torque at 4,000 rpm. Output was raised to 142 kW (191 hp) in 2023, with torque unchanged. Since 2018, the engine has also featured cylinder deactivation for improved fuel economy.

The engine is also used on Mazda's plug-in hybrid (PHEV) models, where it is marketed as the e-Skyactiv PHEV, and paired with an electric motor mounted between the engine and transmission. In the CX-60, it works with a 100 kW (134 hp) electric motor and a 17.8 kWh lithium-ion battery for a combined 241 kW (323 hp) and 500 N⋅m (369 lb⋅ft). In the CX-70, CX-80, and CX-90 PHEVs, it is paired with a 129 kW (173 hp) motor and the same battery, producing 241 kW (323 hp) and 500 N⋅m (369 lbf⋅ft) on premium fuel, or 238 kW (319 hp) on regular. The 2026 CX-90 PHEV is paired with a 68kW electric motor for a total of 323 hp

Applications:

- 2013–2025 Mazda Atenza/Mazda6
- 2013–present Mazda CX-5
- 2014–present Mazda Axela/Mazda3
- 2016–2025 Mazda CX-4
- 2020–present Mazda CX-30
- 2022–present Mazda CX-60
- 2022–present Mazda CX-60 PHEV
- 2023–present Mazda CX-50
- 2023–present Mazda CX-90 PHEV
- 2024–present Mazda CX-70 PHEV
- 2024–present Mazda CX-80 PHEV

=== 2.5 L Turbo ===
The turbocharged version of the Skyactiv-G 2.5 (engine code PY-VPTS) has a 10.5:1 compression ratio. On premium fuel it produces 190 kW (255 hp) of power at 5,000 rpm and 430 N⋅m (317 lb⋅ft) of torque at 2,500 rpm, while on regular fuel output is reduced to 169 kW (227 hp) at 5,000 rpm and 420 N⋅m (310 lbf⋅ft) at 2,000 rpm. Maximum boost pressure is 120 kPa (17 psi). To reduce turbo lag, the engine uses specially designed exhaust passages and butterfly valves that route gases through smaller orifices at low rpm, allowing the turbocharger to spool more quickly. It also employs a unique 4-2-1 exhaust manifold to improve exhaust scavenging and a cooled exhaust gas recirculation system, both designed to reduce combustion chamber temperatures and allow for increased boost with better fuel economy. Intercooler configuration varies by application: the CX-5 and CX-9 use an air-to-air intercooler, while the Mazda3 and CX-30 use an air-to-liquid intercooler integrated into the intake manifold to save space.

Applications:

- 2016–2024 Mazda CX-9
- 2018–present Mazda CX-8
- 2018–2021 Mazda6
- 2019–2025 Mazda CX-5
- 2021–present Mazda3
- 2021–present Mazda CX-30
- 2023–present Mazda CX-50

=== 3.3 L ===
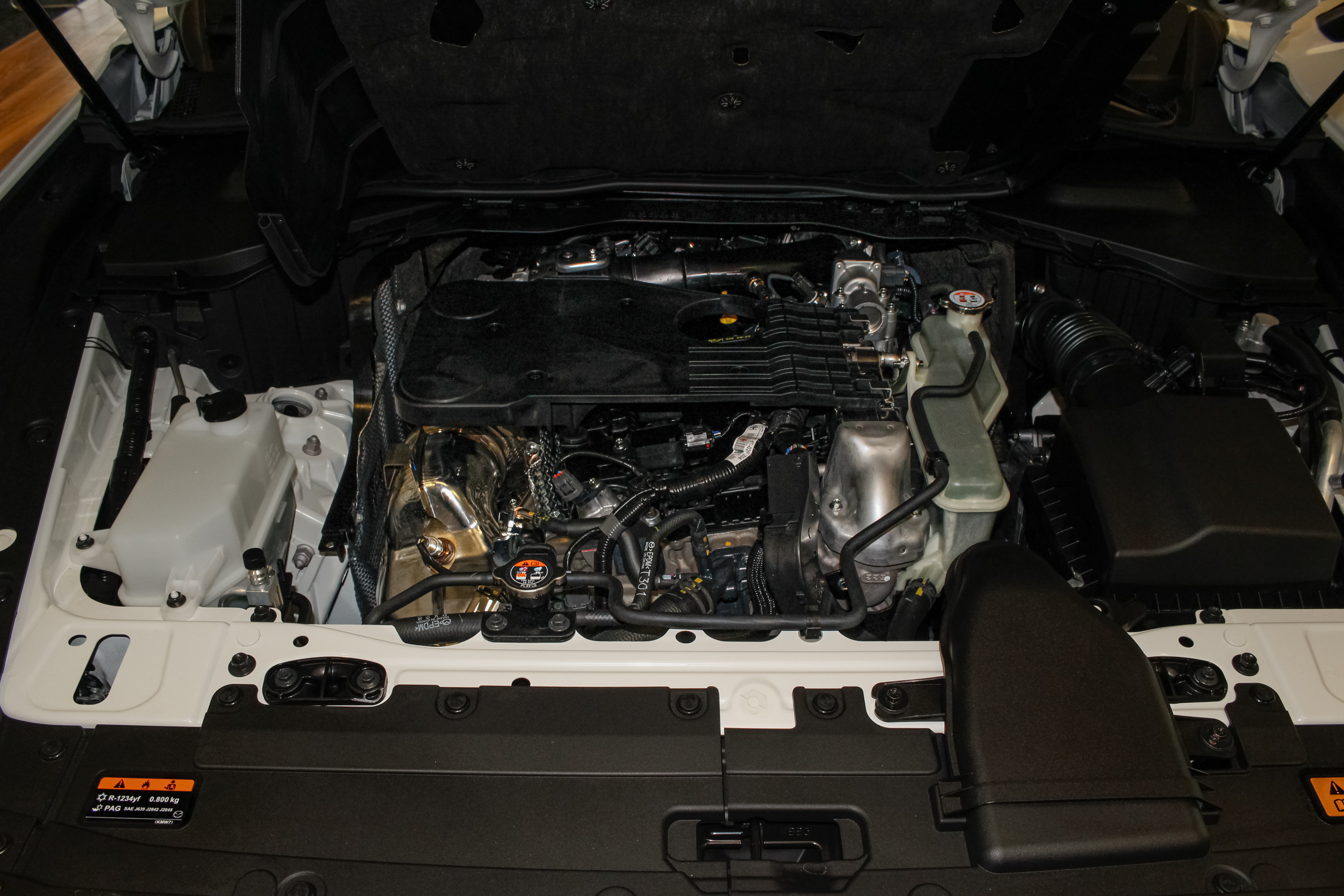
Skyactiv-G 3.3

The Skyactiv-G 3.3 (engine code H3T) is a longitudinal 3,283 cc (200.3 cu in) turbocharged inline-six gasoline engine introduced in the 2023 Mazda CX-90. It has an 86.0 mm (3.39 in) bore and a 94.2 mm (3.71 in) stroke. It has a 12:1 compression ratio.

The engine is offered in two versions. The lower-output version produces 209 kW (280 hp) of power and 450 N⋅m (332 lb⋅ft) of torque. The higher-output version produces 254 kW (341 hp) and 500 N⋅m (370 lbf⋅ft) on premium fuel, or 238 kW (319 hp) on regular.

Applications:

- 2022–present Mazda CX-60
- 2023–present Mazda CX-90
- 2024–present Mazda CX-70
- 2024–present Mazda CX-80

== Skyactiv-X ==
Skyactiv-X
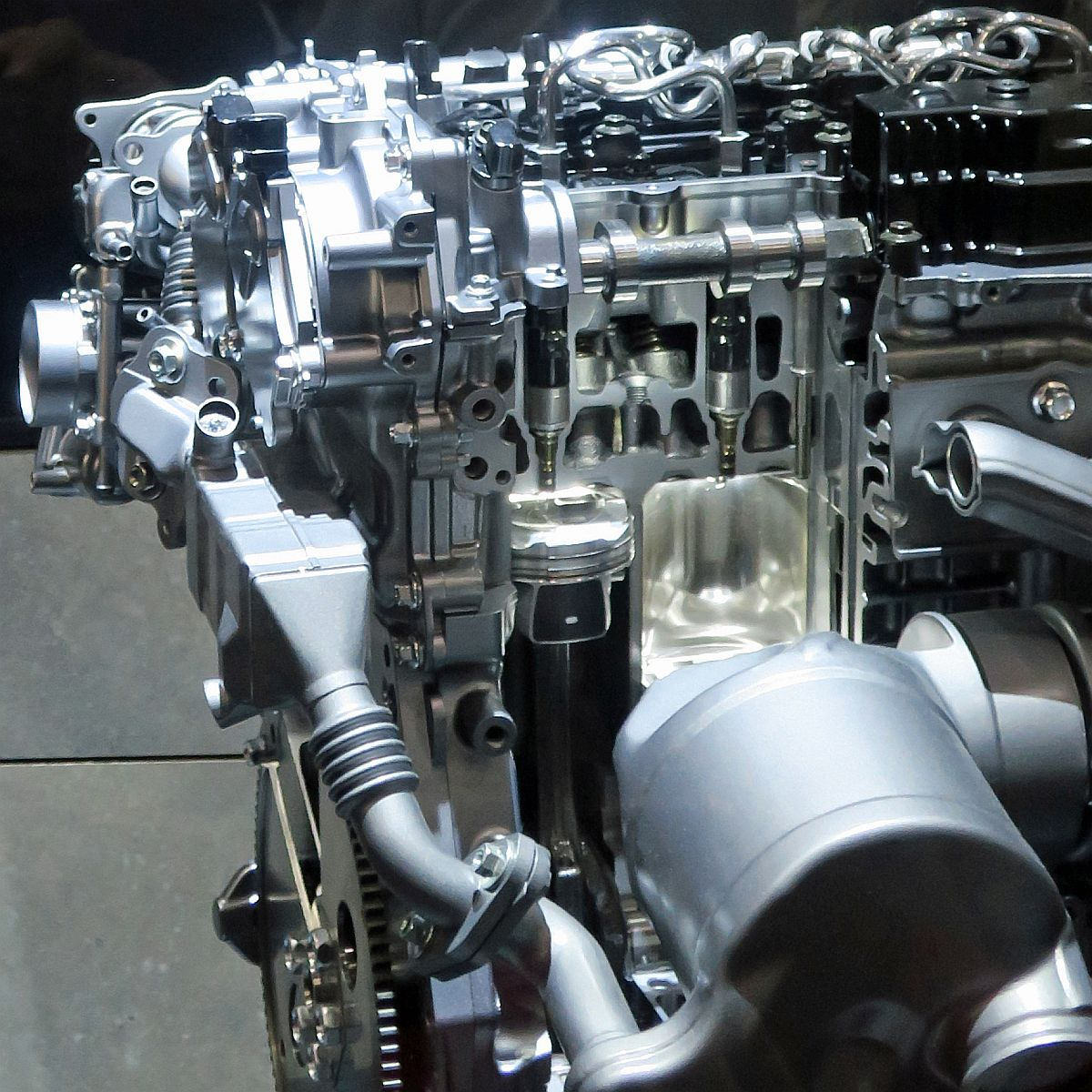

Overview
- Also called: Sky-X
- Production: 2019–present

Layout
- Configuration: Inline-four
- Displacement: 1,998 cc (121.9 cu in)
- Cylinder bore: 83.5 mm (3.29 in)
- Piston stroke: 91.2 mm (3.59 in)
- Cylinder block material: Aluminum
- Cylinder head material: Aluminum
- Valvetrain: DOHC
- Compression ratio: 16.3:1

Combustion
- Supercharger: Lean Supercharged Operation
- Fuel system: Gasoline direct injection
- Fuel type: Gasoline
- Oil system: Wet sump
- Cooling system: Water-cooled

Chronology
- Successor: Skyactiv-Z

Skyactiv-X is the first commercial gasoline engine to use homogeneous charge compression ignition (HCCI), in which the fuel-air mixture ignites spontaneously when compressed by a smaller, separately ignited charge of fuel. This allows it to reach a compression ratio of 16:1, an improvement over the 14:1 ratio of the Skyactiv-G. The engine can operate much leaner than a conventional spark ignition engine, reducing fuel consumption and emissions.

This engine targets 20-30% greater fuel efficiency by utilising HCCI technology. In order to handle ignition problems caused by compression ignition, each cylinder also incorporates a spark plug featuring Spark Controlled Compression Ignition (SPCCI) technology. A small Roots-type supercharger further expands the compression ignition operating window by feeding more air into the engine, leaning out the mixture sufficiently for compression ignition even at higher speeds.

SPCCI works by drawing in a lean, homogeneous air-fuel mixture, it then compresses the mixture until it approaches the point at which it would spontaneously detonate. A second injector then adds a secondary charge of fuel directly on the spark plug. This secondary charge is ignited by the spark plug, causing the cylinder pressure to very quickly rise to a point where the rest of the fuel undergoes compression ignition. The presence of the spark plug allows the engine to also operate as a spark-ignition engine under some operating conditions, such as high-speed high-load situations. Revealed June 5, 2019, the output is 132 kW (179 PS; 177 hp) and 224 N⋅m (165 lb⋅ft).

Mazda originally planned to develop an inline-six variant of the Skyactiv-X architecture with a 3.0-liter displacement for its longitudinal Large Product Group platform. However, the inline-six Skyactiv-X variant was ultimately canceled prior to production. Mazda instead fulfilled its longitudinal powertrain strategy by commercializing 3.3-liter inline-six variations strictly under the turbocharged gasoline Skyactiv-G and diesel Skyactiv-D configurations. Consequently, the Skyactiv-X production line was only ever manufactured as a 2.0-liter four-cylinder unit.

=== 2.0 L ===
Applications:

- 2019–2026 Mazda3 (Europe)
- 2019–present Mazda3 (Japan)
- 2019–present Mazda CX-30

== Skyactiv-D ==
Skyactiv-D
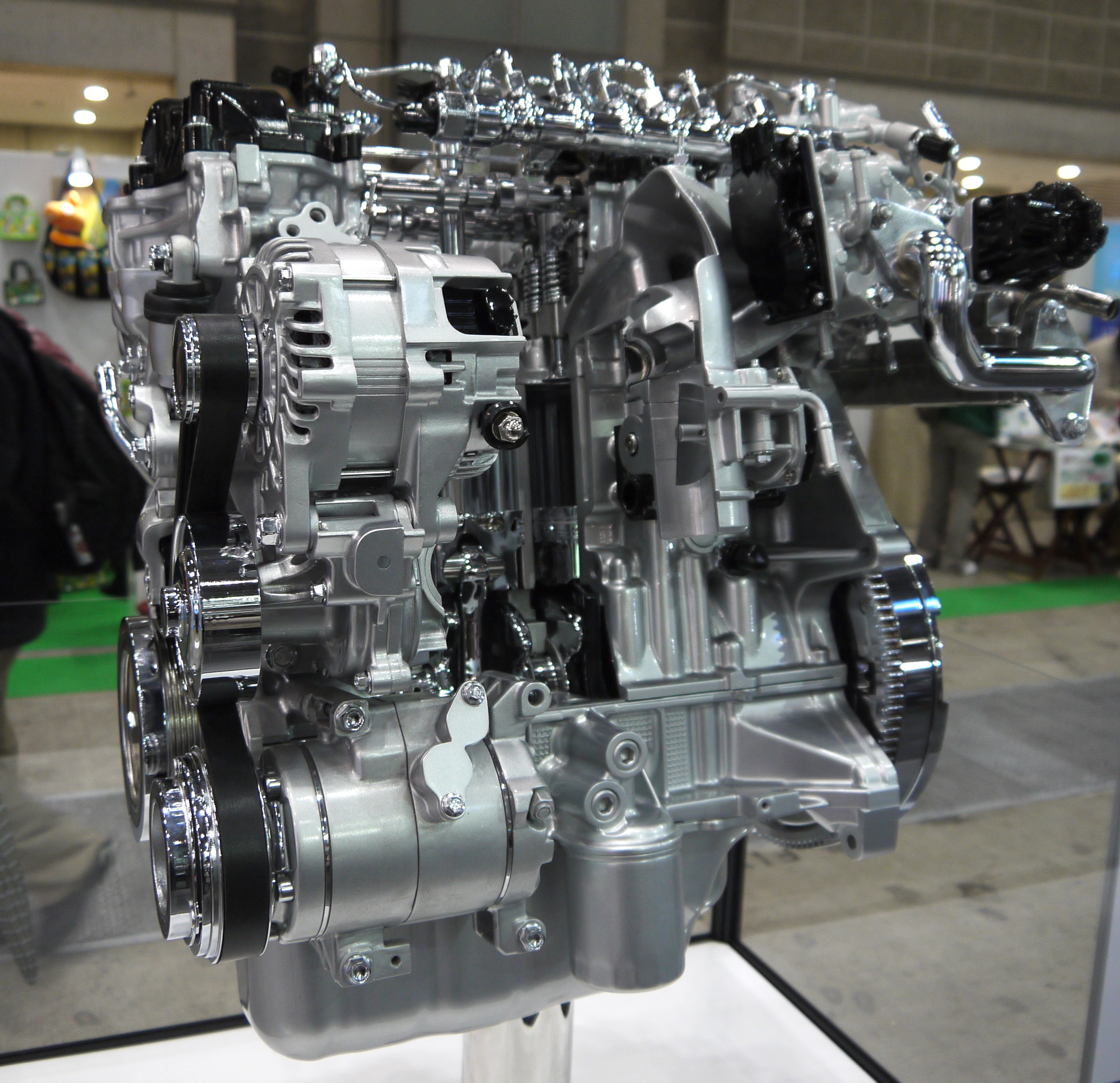

Overview
- Also called: Sky-D
- Production: 2012–present

Layout
- Configuration: Inline-four; Inline-six
- Displacement: 1,497 cc (91.4 cu in); 1,759 cc (107.3 cu in); 2,191 cc (133.7 cu in); 3,287 cc (200.6 cu in)
- Cylinder bore: 76.0 mm; 79.0 mm; 86.0 mm
- Piston stroke: 82.5 mm; 89.7 mm; 94.3 mm
- Cylinder block material: Aluminum
- Cylinder head material: Aluminum
- Valvetrain: DOHC
- Compression ratio: 14.8:1 (1.5L / 1.8L); 14.0:1–14.4:1 (2.2L); 15.2:1 (3.3L)

Combustion
- Fuel system: Common rail
- Fuel type: Diesel
- Oil system: Wet sump
- Cooling system: Water-cooled

Chronology
- Predecessor: Mazda R engine

Skyactiv-D is a family of turbocharged common-rail clean diesel engines designed to comply with global emissions standards without initially requiring selective catalytic reduction (SCR) or complex NOx trap systems. To achieve this, the cylinder compression ratio is lowered to a market-atypical 14.0:1 (increasing slightly on later variants), allowing for a more homogeneous air-fuel mixture that burns cooler to reduce NOx and particulate formation.

To overcome cold-start challenges inherent to low-compression diesels, the engines adopt variable valve lift on the exhaust side to draw hot exhaust gas back into the cylinder during the intake stroke, alongside ceramic glow plugs and multi-hole piezo injectors. Most variants employ a two-stage sequential turbocharger system to maintain stable boost curves across low and high engine loads.

=== 1.5 L ===
The Skyactiv-D 1.5 (S5-DPTS/S5-DPTR) is a 1,497 cc (91 cu in) inline-four engine introduced in 2014 for B-segment and C-segment platforms.

| Engine code | S5-DPTS | S5-DPTR |
|---|---|---|
| Cylinder layout | Inline-four, DOHC, 16-valve, direct injection turbo | |
| Displacement | 1,497 cc | |
| Bore × stroke | 76.0 mm × 82.5 mm | |
| Compression ratio | 14.8:1 | |
| Maximum power | 105 PS (77 kW; 104 hp) at 4,000 rpm | |
| Maximum torque | 220 N⋅m (162 lb⋅ft) at 1,400–3,200 rpm (Manual); 250 N⋅m (184 lb⋅ft) at 1,500–2,500 rpm (Automatic); 270 N⋅m (199 lb⋅ft) at 1,600–2,500 rpm (Mazda3) | |
| i-ELOOP | Not available | Available |

Applications:

- 2014–present Mazda Demio/Mazda2
- 2014–2018 Mazda Axela/Mazda3
- 2015–2018 Mazda CX-3

=== 1.8 L ===
The Skyactiv-D 1.8 (S8-DPTS/S8-DPTR) is a 1,759 cc (107 cu in) engine introduced during the 2018 model year refresh cycles to replace the smaller 1.5-liter unit in European and Japanese markets.

| Engine code | S8-DPTS | S8-DPTR |
|---|---|---|
| Cylinder layout | Inline-four, DOHC, 16-valve, direct injection turbo | |
| Displacement | 1,759 cc | |
| Bore × stroke | 79.0 mm × 89.7 mm | |
| Compression ratio | 14.8:1 | |
| Maximum power | 116 PS (85 kW; 114 hp) at 4,000 rpm | |
| Maximum torque | 270 N⋅m (199 lb⋅ft) at 1,600–2,600 rpm | |
| i-ELOOP | Not available | Available |

Applications:

- 2018–2021 Mazda CX-3
- 2019–present Mazda3
- 2019–present Mazda CX-30

=== 2.2 L ===
The Skyactiv-D 2.2 (SH-VPTS/SH-VPTR) is a 2,191 cc (134 cu in) engine that served as the launch architecture for Mazda's clean-diesel strategy, debuting globally in the first-generation CX-5.

A modified version of the 2.2-liter block was adapted for motorsports application in the 2013 Rolex Sports Car Series season, securing the GX manufacturer's championship for Mazda.

| Engine code | SH-VPTS | SH-VPTR |
|---|---|---|
| Cylinder layout | Inline-four, DOHC, 16-valve, direct injection sequential twin-turbo | |
| Displacement | 2,191 cc | |
| Bore × stroke | 86.0 mm × 94.3 mm | |
| Compression ratio | 14.0:1 (150 PS / 175 PS); 14.4:1 (190 PS / 200 PS) | |
| Maximum power | 150 PS (110 kW; 148 hp) at 4,500 rpm 175 PS (129 kW; 173 hp) at 4,500 rpm 190 PS (140 kW; 187 hp) at 4,500 rpm 200 PS (147 kW; 197 hp) at 4,000 rpm | |
| Maximum torque | 380 N⋅m (280 lb⋅ft) at 1,800–2,600 rpm 420 N⋅m (310 lb⋅ft) at 2,000 rpm 450 N⋅m (332 lb⋅ft) at 2,000 rpm | |
| i-ELOOP | Not available | Available |

Applications:

- 2012–2024 Mazda CX-5
- 2012–2023 Mazda6
- 2013–2018 Mazda3
- 2017–2023 Mazda CX-8

=== 3.3 L ===
The Skyactiv-D 3.3 (T3-VPTS) is a longitudinally positioned, 3,287 cc (201 cu in) inline-six engine introduced in 2022 for Mazda's rear-wheel-drive large vehicle architecture. It introduces an optimized egg-shaped combustion chamber layout designated as *Distribution-Controlled Partially Premixed Charge Compression Ignition* (DCPCI) to improve thermal efficiency. The engine is coupled to an integrated 48-volt mild-hybrid setup branded as *M Hybrid Boost*.

| Engine code | T3-VPTS |
|---|---|
| Cylinder layout | Inline-six, DOHC, 24-valve, direct injection turbo with 48V MHEV |
| Displacement | 3,287 cc |
| Bore × stroke | 86.0 mm × 94.3 mm |
| Compression ratio | 15.2:1 |
| Maximum power (Engine only) | 200 PS (147 kW; 197 hp) at 3,600–4,200 rpm 254 PS (187 kW; 251 hp) at 3,750 rpm |
| Maximum torque (Engine only) | 450 N⋅m (332 lb⋅ft) at 1,400–3,000 rpm 550 N⋅m (406 lb⋅ft) at 1,500–2,400 rpm |

Applications:

- 2022–present Mazda CX-60
- 2023–present Mazda CX-90
- 2024–present Mazda CX-80

=== Operational History and Recalls ===
Early production runs of the 2.2-liter Skyactiv-D engine suffered from operational issues involving engine oil dilution, stemming from fuel mixing with the crankcase oil during low-temperature Diesel Particulate Filter (DPF) regeneration cycles.

In September 2016, Mazda issued a recall in Japan for 130,000 diesel-powered vehicles to fix an issue where carbon deposit accumulation inside the intake manifold caused unexpected valvetrain wear or engine stalling. This issue resurfaced in October 2019, culminating in a recall of approximately 35,000 vehicles in Australia across the Mazda3, Mazda6, and CX-5 lines to address premature component wear driven by severe internal carbon buildup and vacuum pump decay.

=== Emissions Verification ===
Following the 2015 Volkswagen emissions scandal, the Japanese Ministry of Land, Infrastructure, Transport and Tourism conducted real-world emissions testing on domestic diesel configurations. The Skyactiv-D engine emerged as the only tested model that maintained on-road emissions levels closely matching laboratory standards without using defeat devices.

To launch the 2.2-liter engine variant under stricter United States Environmental Protection Agency (EPA) regulations at the 2019 New York International Auto Show, Mazda modified the engine structure. The emissions-compliance modifications required for North America resulted in lower fuel economy ratings and reduced performance margins (168 hp at 4,000 rpm) compared to the unconstrained variants sold in European and Australian markets.

== Skyactiv-Hybrid ==
Skyactiv-Hybrid is a gasoline-electric hybrid powertrain technology that pairs a Mazda Skyactiv-G engine with components from Toyota's Hybrid Synergy Drive system. The technology sharing arrangement was originally finalized in 2010 for use in production vehicles beginning in 2013.

The first retail implementation of the technology was the JDM-spec Mazda3 (sold as the Mazda Axela in Japan) Skyactiv-Hybrid, which debuted at the 2013 Tokyo Motor Show. The vehicle utilizes a specially modified 2.0-liter Skyactiv-G engine featuring a 14:1 compression ratio, coupled via a power-split transaxle to an electric motor and a nickel-metal hydride battery pack.

Applications:

- 2013–2019 Mazda3 Skyactiv-Hybrid (Japan market only)

== Skyactiv-CNG ==
Skyactiv-CNG is a dual-fuel engine concept powered by compressed natural gas (CNG) or gasoline. The technology was showcased via the Mazda3 Skyactiv-CNG Concept at the 2013 Tokyo Motor Show, though it never entered mass production.

Because baseline Skyactiv-G gasoline engines already feature a high 14:1 compression ratio, Mazda engineers designed the engine to require only minor modifications to accommodate the high combustion pressures of CNG fuel. The dual-fuel powertrain was stated to reduce greenhouse gas emissions by approximately 20 percent compared to a standard gasoline engine of equal displacement.

== Skyactiv-R ==
Skyactiv-R is the brand name used for Mazda's next-generation rotary engine technology. The architecture was introduced via the front-engine, rear-wheel-drive Mazda RX-Vision Concept at the 2015 Tokyo Motor Show, serving as a placeholder for the company's continuous rotary research and development.

In 2023, Mazda launched its first mass-production iteration derived from this technological generation, designated as the 8C engine. Employed in the Mazda MX-30 e-Skyactiv R-EV, the powerplant functions exclusively as a range extender in a series plug-in hybrid configuration, driving a generator rather than the vehicle's wheels. The 830 cc single-rotor engine features direct fuel injection and a 11.9:1 compression ratio, producing an engine-only output of 55 kW (74 hp) at 4,700 rpm and 116 N·m (86 lb·ft) of torque at 4,000 rpm.

Applications:

- 2023–present Mazda MX-30 e-Skyactiv R-EV (as a generator)

== e-Skyactiv ==
e-Skyactiv is an overarching brand name used by Mazda for its range of electrified powertrain technologies. Introduced in 2019 alongside the battery-electric Mazda MX-30, the nomenclature covers pure battery electric vehicles (BEVs), plug-in hybrids (PHEVs), series plug-in hybrids with rotary range extenders (R-EV), and mild-hybrid systems (MHEV) paired with conventional Skyactiv-G and Skyactiv-D engines.

Powertrain variants include:

- e-Skyactiv G / e-Skyactiv D: Mild-hybrid architectures integrating a 24-volt or 48-volt electrical assist system into gasoline or diesel internal combustion engines.
- e-Skyactiv PHEV: Plug-in hybrid systems pairing an inline engine with an electric motor and a lithium-ion battery pack.
- e-Skyactiv R-EV: A series plug-in hybrid system utilizing a compact rotary engine strictly as an electricity generator to power an electric traction motor.
- e-Skyactiv EV: A pure battery-electric vehicle powertrain.

Applications:

- 2019–present Mazda3 (MHEV)
- 2019–present Mazda CX-30 (MHEV)
- 2020–present Mazda MX-30 (EV, MHEV, R-EV)
- 2022–present Mazda CX-60 (MHEV, PHEV)
- 2023–present Mazda CX-90 (MHEV, PHEV)
- 2024–present Mazda CX-70 (MHEV, PHEV)
- 2024–present Mazda CX-80 (MHEV, PHEV)

== e-Skyactiv G, e-Skyactiv D, and e-Skyactiv X ==
e-Skyactiv G, e-Skyactiv D, and e-Skyactiv X are mild hybrid vehicles (MHEV) pairing one of Mazda's Skyactiv engine families with either a 48V transmission-integrated electric motor (Large Product Group models), or a 24V belt-driven ISG (integrated starter generator) on Small Product Group models.

Mazda's Large Product Group models (CX-60, CX-70, CX-80, CX-90) use a 16.6 hp (12 kW) compact electric motor inside of the 8-speed automatic transmission. Mazda pairs this system to their 3.3L turbodiesel inline-six engine and 3.3L turbocharged gasoline inline-six engine. The electric motor is situated between the wet multiplate clutch and the transmission's shift elements. This system is designed to aid the internal combustion engine at low RPM when the turbocharger is unable to produce adequate boost pressure due to low exhaust gas flow. The electric motor can instantly deliver peak horsepower and torque at just 900 rpm to mask perceptible turbo lag and alleviate the need for the vehicle to downshift when climbing hills or gently accelerating. This improves overall responsiveness, performance, and efficiency. These MHEV models are able to briefly travel on electric-only power for short bursts at very low loads, or coast with the engine off for extended periods of time. The electric motor enables regenerative braking when the accelerator pedal is not depressed, allowing the battery pack to capture energy that can later be used to boost the engine. It also reduces how much friction braking force is required, potentially extending brake pad and rotor life. Energy is stored in a small 0.33kWh battery pack in all Large Product Group MHEV models. While peak electric motor output is only 16.6 hp (12 kW), peak torque output is a more generous 113 lb⋅ft (153 N⋅m). Both figures are available at 900 rpm.

In the Small Product Group vehicles, Mazda uses a lower cost 24V belt-driven ISG in place of a traditional starter that can output approximately 6.5 hp (5 kW) and 39 lb⋅ft (53 N⋅m). Since this electric motor acts directly on the crankshaft, it is not able to power the vehicle on electricity alone like the Large Product Group's electric motor, however it can exert a small regenerative braking effect during deceleration.

=== Applications ===
- 2019–present Mazda3
- 2019–present Mazda CX-30
- 2023–present Mazda CX-5
- 2022–present Mazda CX-60
- 2024–present Mazda CX-70
- 2024–present Mazda CX-80
- 2022–present Mazda CX-90

== Skyactiv-Z ==
The Skyactiv-Z engine was developed to replace the Skyactiv-G and Skyactiv-X engines. It is a hybrid 2.5-liter inline-four gasoline engine designed to meet stringent emission standards, including Euro 7 and North America's LEV4 and Tier 4 regulations. The engine aims to deliver improved fuel efficiency and enhanced performance, while maintaining affordability for mass-market vehicles.

Engine Type: 2.5-liter inline-four gasoline hybrid

Emission Standards: Euro 7, LEV4, Tier 4

Performance Goals: Improved fuel efficiency, enhanced driving performance

Applications:

- 2027 Mazda CX-5 Hybrid

== Skyactiv-Drive ==
Skyactiv-Drive is a range of automatic transmissions developed and produced by Mazda. Beginning in the early 2010s, Mazda began development of a new in-house transmission to replace the older four and five-speed units they had developed with Ford during their partnership. Mazda engineers decided against using either a Continuously Variable Transmission or Dual-clutch transmission because they deemed both to exhibit sub-optimal behaviors. Dual-clutch transmissions struggle to match the low-speed refinement of a traditional torque converter automatic gearbox, while Mazda engineers deemed a CVT would be incompatible with the brand's driving dynamics philosophy due to poor throttle responsiveness, persistent engine droning, and a disconnected "rubber band effect" caused by belt slippage and delayed acceleration. Instead, Mazda chose to design a conventional 6-speed planetary automatic transmission for use in transverse engine, front and all-wheel drive vehicles. They improved its efficiency and responsiveness by downsizing the impeller and turbine inside the torque converter and incorporating a multi-plate lock-up clutch. This setup expands the torque converter lock-up range across all six forward gears from low vehicle speeds, virtually eliminating hydrodynamic slip losses and wasted heat generation during normal driving to improve fuel economy.

In 2022, Mazda introduced their second generation Sky-DRIVE 8-speed automatic transmission for Large Product Group vehicles (such as the CX-60, CX-80, and CX-70/CX-90. This new transmission is designed exclusively for use in longitudinal, rear or all-wheel drive vehicles. The transmission is paired to Mazda’s all-new 3.3 L turbocharged I6 engines which are available in gasoline and diesel variants, as well as a PHEV variant that pairs Mazda’s existing Skyactiv-G 2.5 L naturally aspirated I4 with an electric motor. Mazda eliminated the traditional hydraulic torque converter in favor of an electronically controlled multi-plate wet clutch. They also introduced several key efficiency and performance improvements over their older transverse 6-speed automatic transaxle. By removing the torque converter, the transmission no longer has an impeller and turbine churning transmission fluid during vehicle launch, low-speed maneuvers, and gear transitions. This eliminates hydrodynamic slip and viscous shearing losses, providing a direct mechanical connection and reducing parasitic drag from the transmission fluid pump. The transmission features a wide gear ratio spread of 8.37:1 (spanning from a 5.258:1 first gear to a 0.628:1 eighth gear), representing a 41.2% increase in overall ratio spread over the 6-speed's 5.93:1 spread. This wide gearing combines an aggressive first gear that provides mechanical torque multiplication off the line without converter slip, alongside tall overdrive gears that lower engine speeds during highway cruising.

Furthermore, without the bulky torque converter, Mazda had enough space inside the transmission bellhousing to package an integrated electric motor. All Large Product models are electrified, either as mild-hybrid vehicles or plug-in hybrid vehicles. In mild hybrid (MHEV/M Hybrid Boost) models, a 48-volt motor contributes 12 kW (16.6 hp) and 153 N⋅m (113 lb⋅ft) of torque at just 900 rpm. This motor provides idle-stop restarts, extended engine off coasting, regenerative braking recovery, low-rpm torque fill, and under very light loads can even propel the vehicle on electric power alone for short bursts. Plug-in hybrid (PHEV) models adopt a larger permanent-magnet synchronous electric motor producing 129 kW (173 hp) and 270 N⋅m (199 lb⋅ft) of torque to enable pure-electric driving at up to 140 km/h (87 mph).

== Skyactiv-MT ==
Skyactiv-MT is a family of six-speed manual transmissions developed to deliver a short, crisp shift throw reminiscent of the Mazda MX-5 sports car while improving fuel efficiency through internal friction reduction. To achieve lighter shifting effort with a shortened shift lever stroke, the transmission's lever ratio is increased. To accommodate the resulting shorter internal stroke, a small-module spline is utilized on the synchronizers. Shift throws are reduced by 15 percent compared to preceding designs, making it one of the shortest-shifting manual transmissions available in a standard passenger vehicle.

To reduce weight and structural footprint, the manual transaxle employs a triple-shafted gear train layout that uses a common gear configuration for 2nd and 3rd gears. By commonizing the functions of 1st and reverse gear, Mazda engineers shortened the secondary shaft by 20 percent and completely eliminated the dedicated reverse idle shaft, achieving an overall transmission weight reduction of roughly 16 percent.

== Skyactiv Multi-Solution Scalable Architecture ==
The Skyactiv Multi-Solution Scalable Architecture is a car platform that supports both front-wheel drive models with a transverse engine layout (under the Small Product Group) and rear-wheel drive cars with a longitudinal engine layout (under the Large Product Group).

=== Small Product Group ===
The Small Product Group underpins front-wheel drive and all-wheel drive vehicles with a transverse engine layout. Applications:

- 2019–present Mazda3
- 2019–present Mazda CX-30
- 2020–present Mazda MX-30
- 2022–present Mazda CX-50

=== Large Product Group ===
The Large Product Group underpins rear-wheel drive and all-wheel drive vehicles with a longitudinal engine layout.

Applications:

- 2022–present Mazda CX-60
- 2023–present Mazda CX-90
- 2024–2026 Mazda CX-70
- 2024–present Mazda CX-80
