= Mazda CX-4 =

Compact crossover SUV

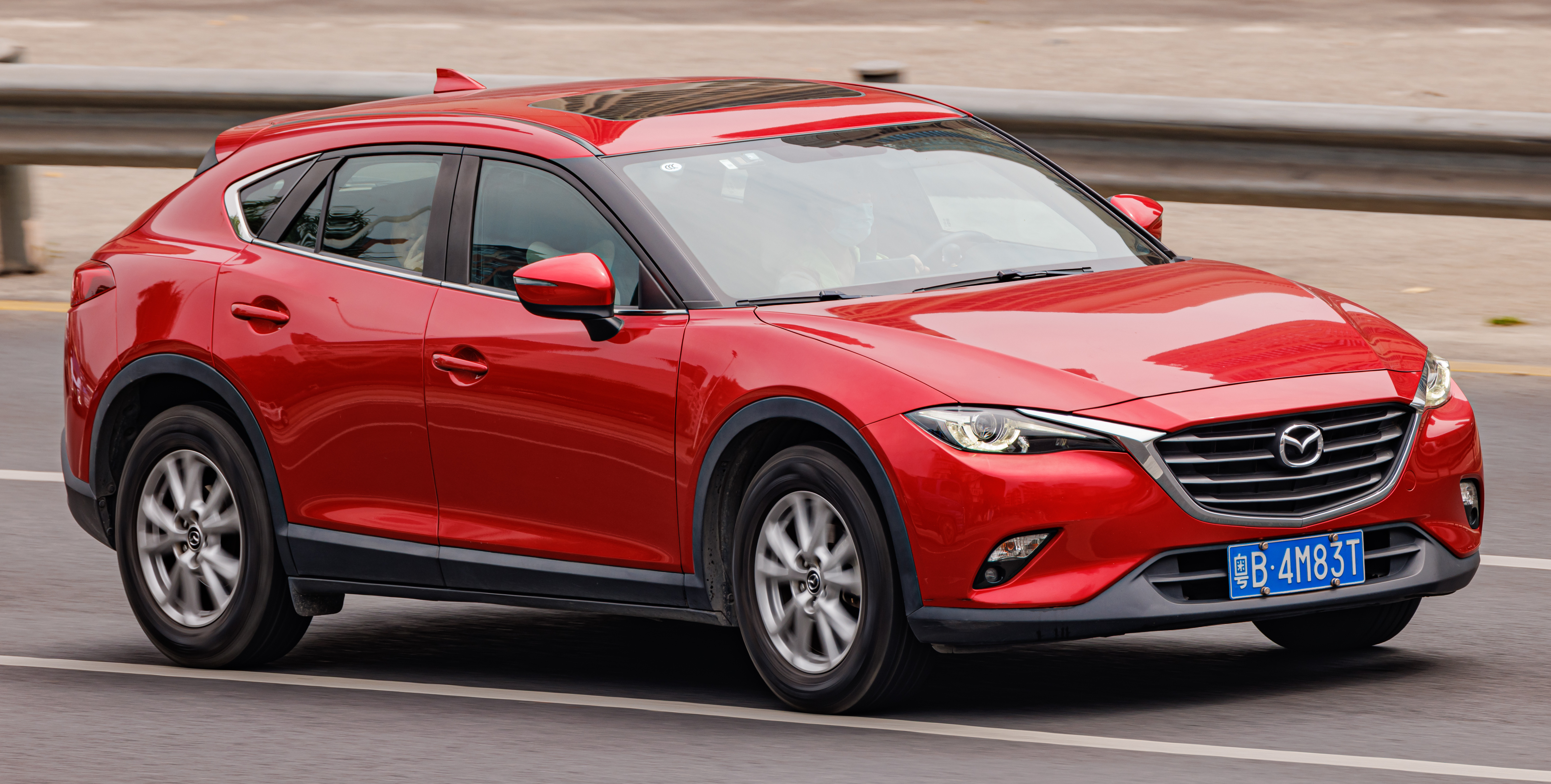
- Pre-facelift

Overview
- Manufacturer: Mazda
- Model code: GK
- Production: 2016–2023
- Model years: 2017–2021
- Assembly: China: Changchun, Jilin (FAW Mazda, 2016–2025); Nanjing (Changan Mazda, 2023–2025)

Body and chassis
- Class: Compact crossover SUV
- Body style: 5-door SUV
- Layout: Front-engine, front-wheel-drive; Front-engine, all-wheel-drive
- Related: Mazda3 (BM); Mazda CX-5 (KE)

Powertrain
- Engine: 2.0 L Skyactiv-G PE-VPS I4 (gasoline); 2.5 L Skyactiv-G PY-VPS (gasoline)
- Transmission: 6-speed Skyactiv-Drive automatic

Dimensions
- Wheelbase: 2,700 mm (106.3 in)
- Length: 4,633 mm (182.4 in)
- Width: 1,840 mm (72.4 in)
- Height: 1,530–1,535 mm (60.2–60.4 in)
- Curb weight: 1,493–1,622 kg (3,292–3,576 lb)

Chronology
- Predecessor: Mazda CX-7 (China); Mazda Tribute (China)

The Mazda CX-4 is a compact crossover SUV produced and sold exclusively in China. First introduced at the Beijing Motor Show in April 2016, it was originally manufactured by the joint venture FAW Mazda until 2023, when Changan Mazda acquired 100% of the joint venture.

== Overview ==
The design of the Mazda CX-4 production car was previewed by the concept, the Mazda Koeru. Positioned above the Mazda CX-3, the CX-4 is more similar to a station wagon in profile, while similar to the CX-5 in size.

The CX-4 is offered with a choice of two Skyactiv straight-four engines: A 2.0-litre (PE-VPS) and a 2.5-litre (PY-VPS). The 2.0-litre Skyactiv-G engine produces 158 hp (117 kW) and the 2.5-litre Skyactiv-G engine produces 192 hp (143 kW). The 2.0-litre engine model is only available as a front-wheel-drive model and offers a choice between a six-speed manual transmission and the Skyactiv-Drive automatic transmission. The 2.5-litre engine model offers AWD and comes standard with the six-speed automatic transmission.

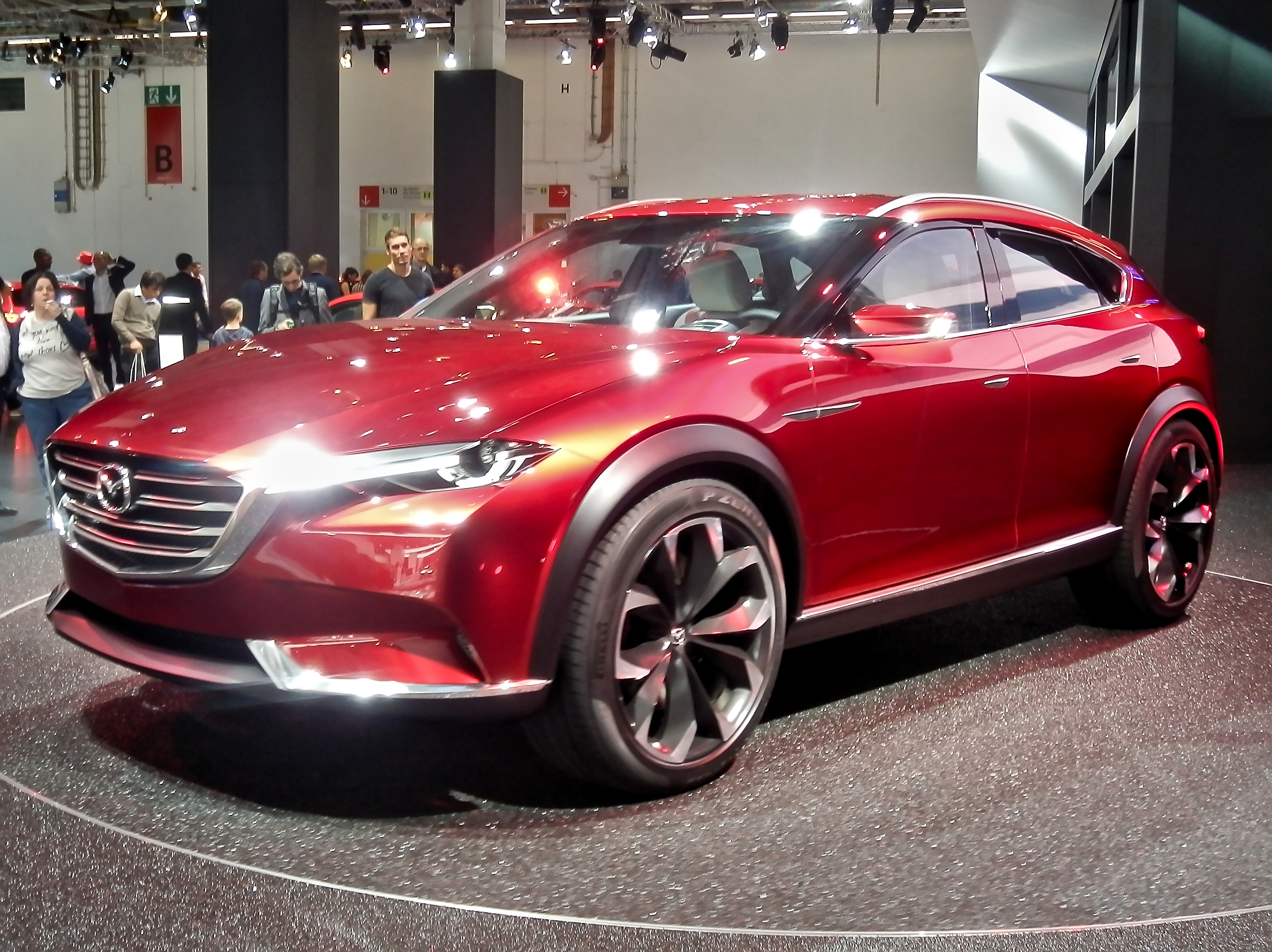
Mazda Koeru at IAA 2015

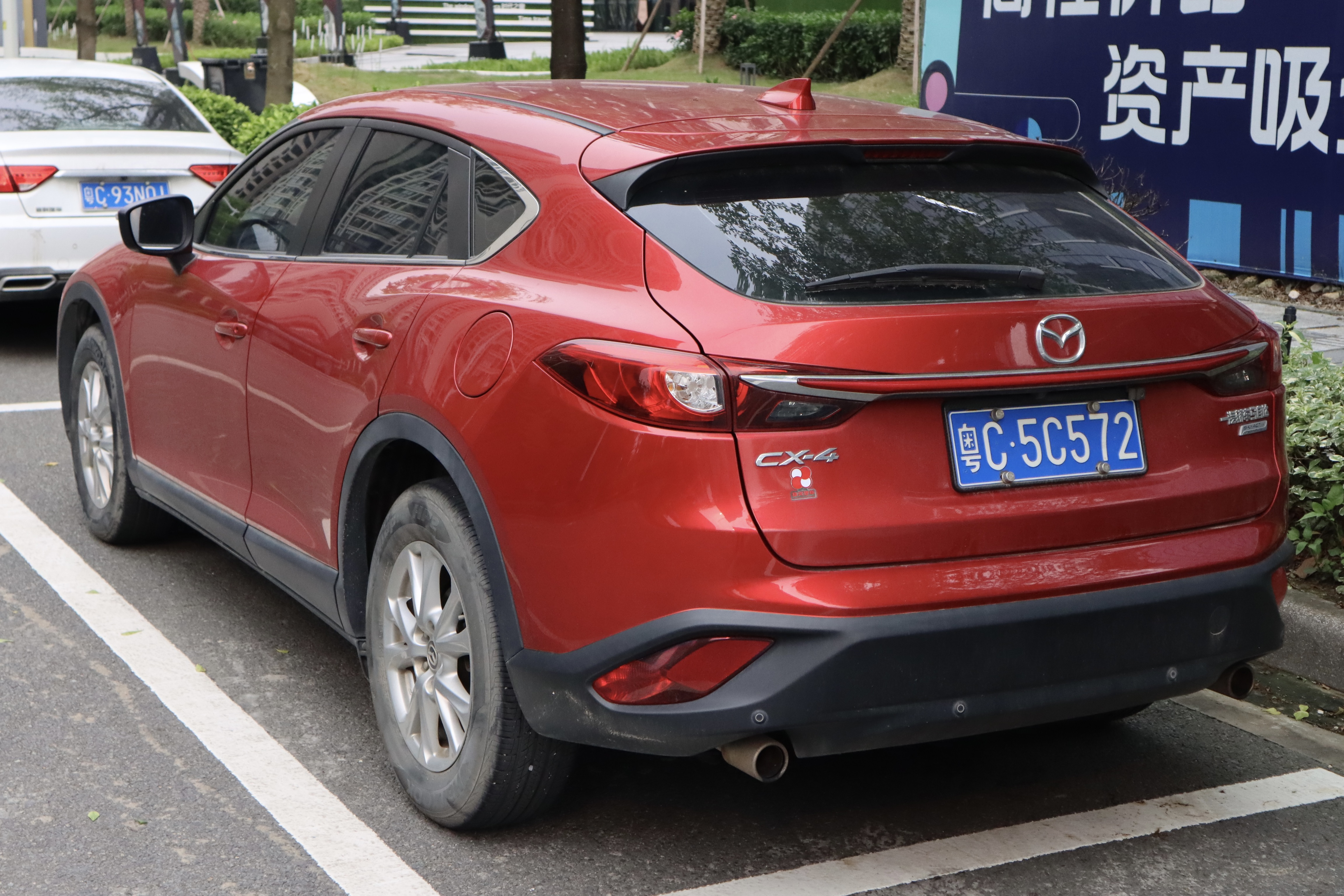
Rear view

=== 2020 facelift ===
The 2020 CX-4 facelift was revealed in late 2019. The facelift included redesigned bumpers and radiator grille, as well as new taillight patterns. The powertrain remained unchanged.

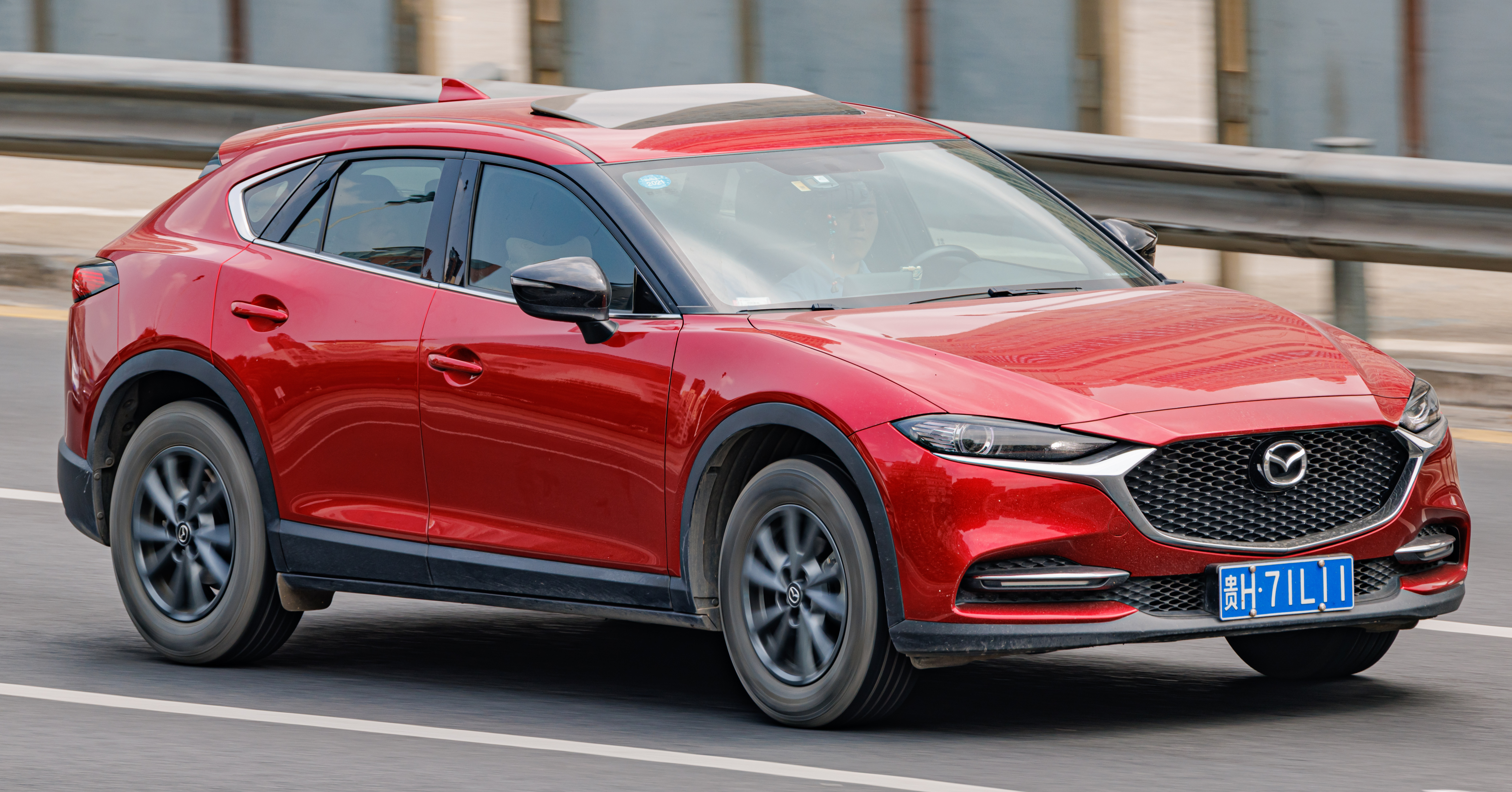
CX-4 facelift

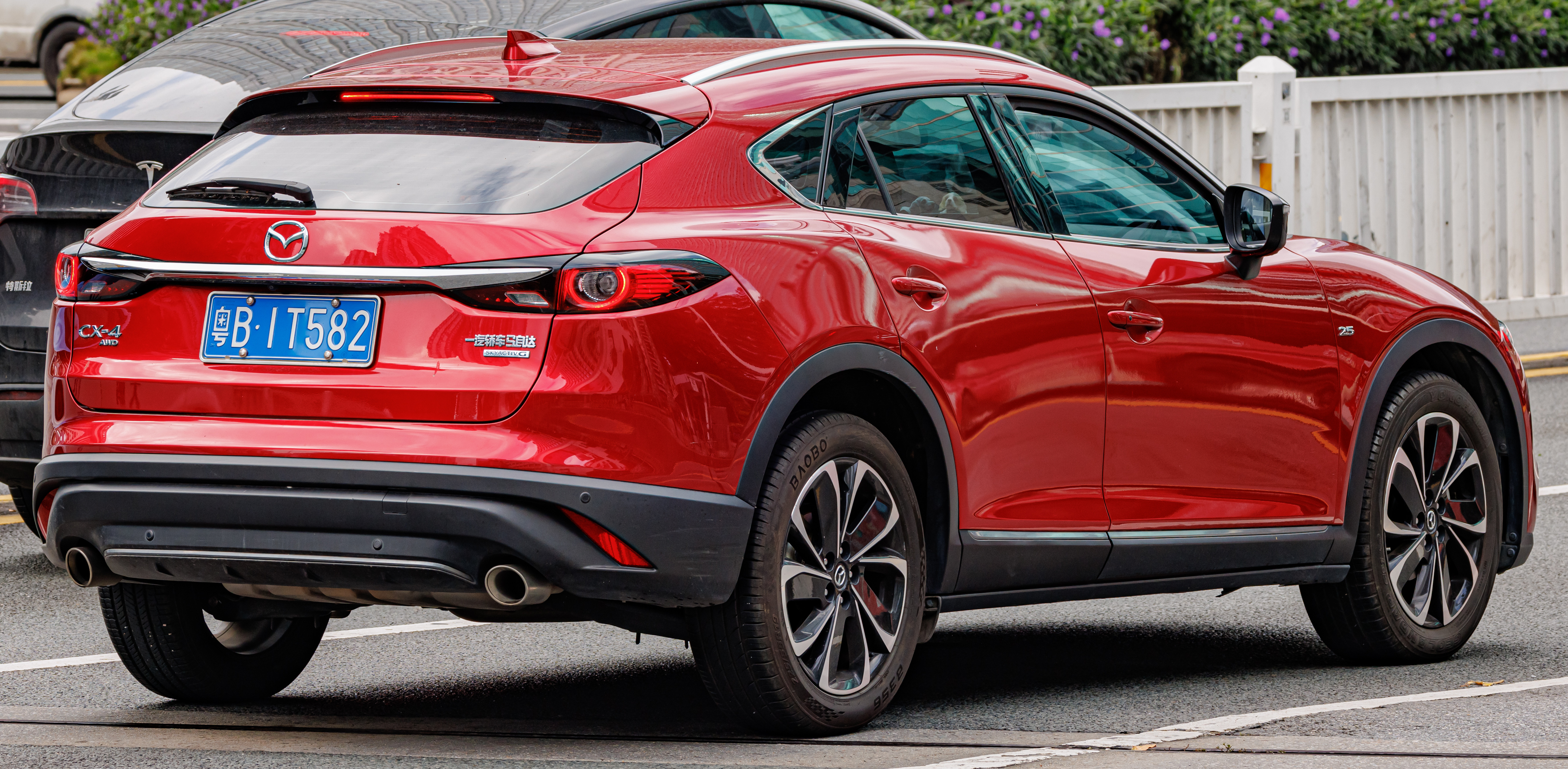
CX-4 facelift rear view

=== Discontinuation ===
The decision to discontinue the CX-4 was made in early 2023 after deliveries for the model fell below the 10,000 unit mark in 2022.

== Chinese copy controversy ==
In January 2018, Zotye Auto unveiled its crossover, the Traum MA501, which bears a striking resemblance to the CX-4.

== Sales ==
Year	China
2017	21,117
2018	61,376
2019	49,419
2020	48,796
2021	19,383
2022	6,573
2023	4,636
2024	14
2025	—
