= Mazda MX-30 =

Compact crossover SUV

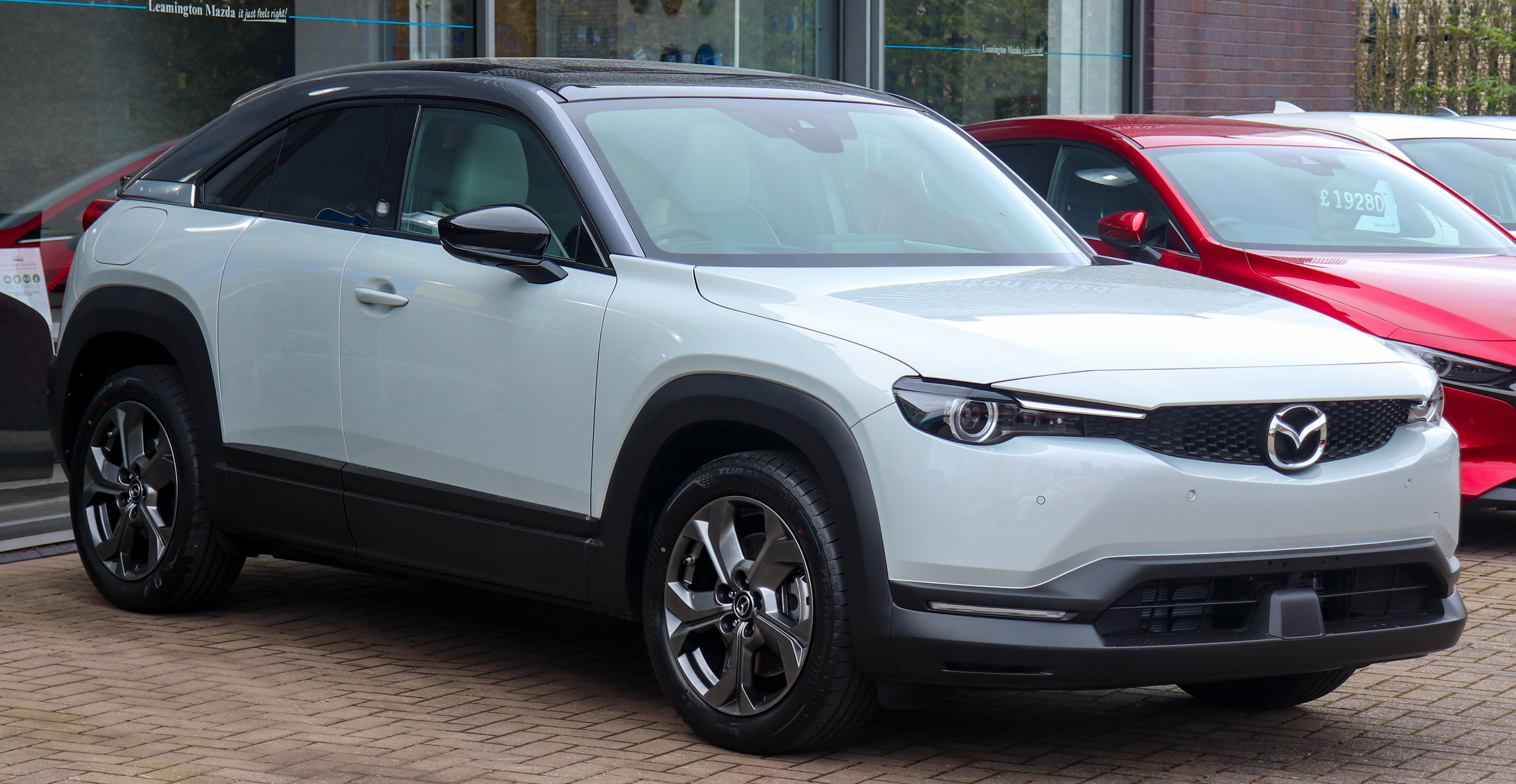

Overview
- Manufacturer: Mazda
- Model code: DR
- Production: 2020–present
- Model years: 2022–2023 (United States); 2022–2024 (Canada); 2022–2026 (Europe)
- Assembly: Japan: Hiroshima (Hiroshima Plant)
- Designer: Yōichi Matsuda

Body and chassis
- Class: Compact crossover SUV
- Body style: 5-door SUV
- Layout: Front-motor, front-wheel-drive (BEV, PHEV); Front-engine, all-wheel-drive (MHEV) (Note: Japan, Australia and New Zealand only)
- Platform: e-Skyactiv
- Doors: Conventional front doors; Freestyle rear doors
- Related: Mazda CX-30; Mazda3 (BP)

Powertrain
- Engine: 830 cc single-rotor Wankel rotary (generator only) (PHEV); 1997 cc e-Skyactiv-G I4 (MHEV)
- Electric motor: e-Skyactiv Water-cooled synchronous AC motor; 24-volt e-motor (e-Skyactiv-G)
- Power output: 105 kW (141 hp; 143 PS) (BEV); 125 kW (168 hp; 170 PS) (PHEV); 107 kW (143 hp; 145 PS) (MHEV)
- Transmission: Single-speed automatic transmission (BEV, PHEV); 6-speed Skyactiv-Drive automatic (MHEV)
- Hybrid drivetrain: MHEV (e-Skyactiv-G); series plug-in hybrid or EREV (MX-30 PHEV)
- Battery: 35.5 kWh prismatic lithium ion
- Electric range: 200 km (124 mi) (WLTP) 100 mi (161 km) (EPA)
- Plug-in charging: DC: (Note: Uses CHAdeMO connector in Japan or CCS connector in other markets) 40 kW; AC: 6.6 kW

Dimensions
- Wheelbase: 2,655 mm (104.5 in)
- Length: 4,395 mm (173.0 in)
- Width: 1,795 mm (70.7 in)
- Height: 1,570 mm (61.8 in)
- Kerb weight: 1,645–1,778 kg (3,627–3,920 lb)

The Mazda MX-30 is a compact crossover SUV produced by Mazda and sold with battery electric (BEV), plug-in hybrid (PHEV), and mild hybrid (MHEV) variants. Based on the CX-30, it was unveiled at the 2019 Tokyo Motor Show. Production of the vehicle, which is Mazda's first mass-produced electric car, began at their Ujina factory on 19 May 2020.

The plug-in hybrid variant uses a drivetrain operating in series, with a rotary engine acting as a range extender to the batteries. As one of the first automakers to successfully manufacture and market a Wankel rotary engine, Mazda built the engines longer than anyone else, with their last example installed in the Mazda RX-8. It is also Mazda's first rotary-engined front-wheel-drive car since the Luce R130.

== Overview ==
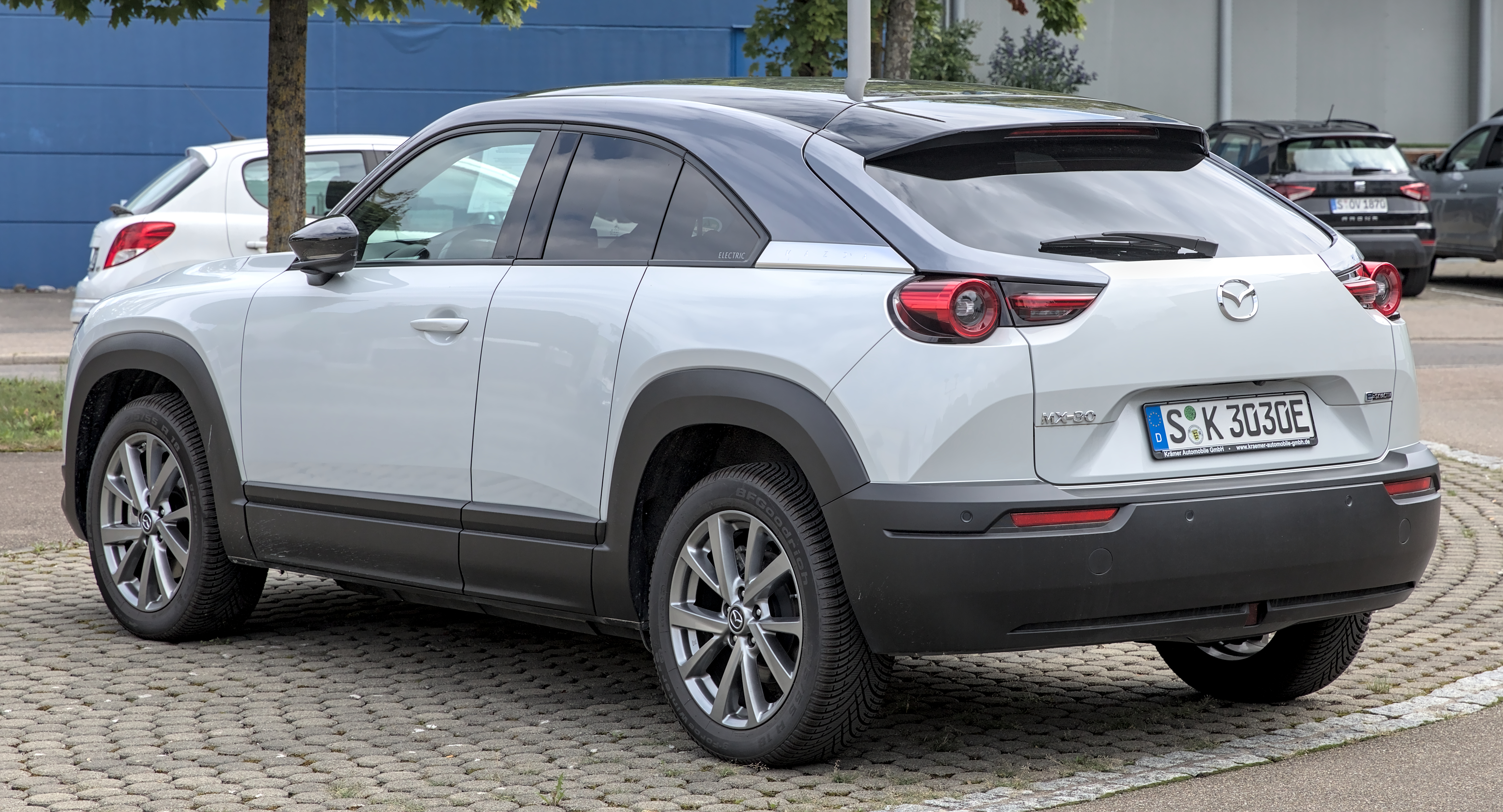
Rear view

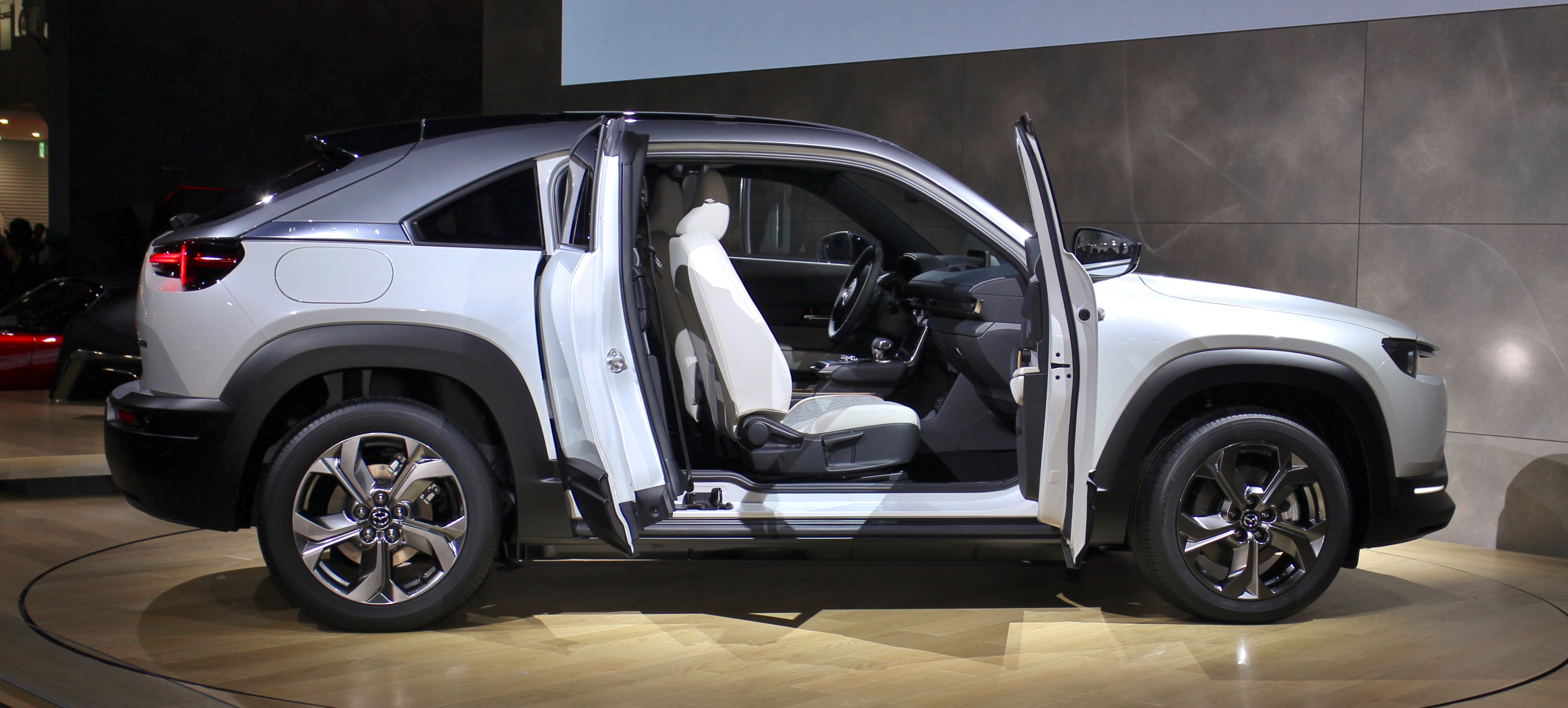
The MX-30's freestyle doors

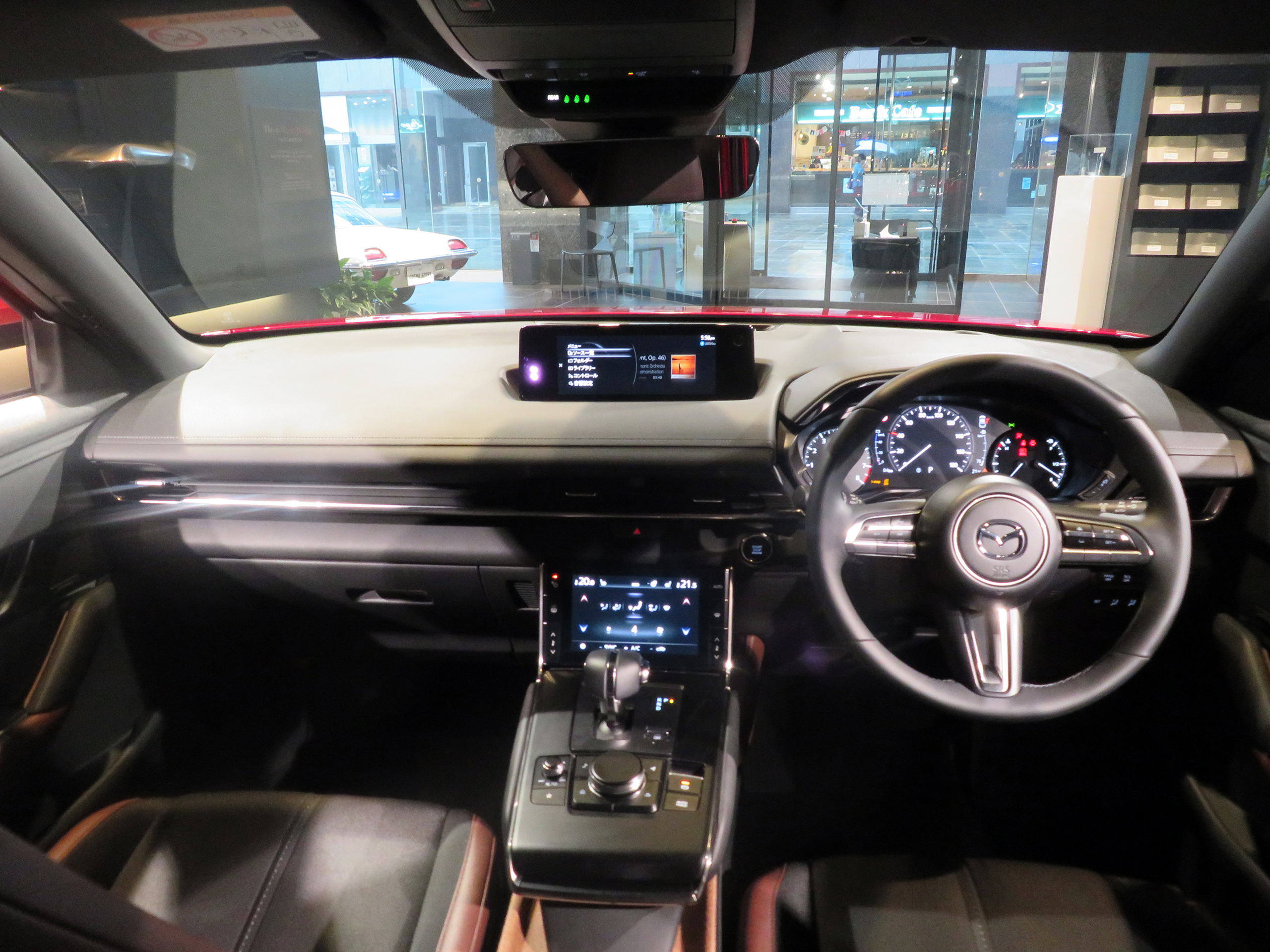
Interior

The MX-30 features clamshell doors, marketed as freestyle doors by Mazda and previously used on the rotary-engined RX-8 sports car. It uses MacPherson strut front suspension and torsion beam rear suspension.

The MX-30 is powered by an electric motor supported by a 35.5 kWh battery with a power output of 105 kW (141 hp; 143 PS) and 264 N⋅m (195 lbf⋅ft) torque, offering a range of 209 km (130 mi). Up to 80% charge can be achieved within 30 to 40 minutes via 40 kW DC charging. With a 6.6 kW AC (1 phase, 230V, 29A) charging unit, the MX-30 is claimed to get fully recharged within 4.5 hours.

The plug-in hybrid variant was presented on 14 January 2023. Its drivetrain operates in series, featuring a rotary engine that acts as a range extender to recharge the batteries, but not to power the vehicle's wheels directly. The Wankel engine is a naturally aspirated single-rotor unit with a chamber volume of 830 cc, petrol direct injection, exhaust gas recirculation, a three-way catalyst and a particulate filter. Its rated power output is 55 kW (75 PS; 74 hp). In Japan, Australia and New Zealand, a gasoline-powered all-wheel-drive mild hybrid version is also available. This version is powered by Mazda's 2.0 L e-Skyactiv-G four-cylinder engine.

== Markets ==
=== Asia ===
==== Indonesia ====
The MX-30 EV was launched in Indonesia on 11 November 2024, in a sole variant.

==== Japan ====
The MX-30 went on sale in Japan on 8 October 2020, in a sole grade with four combination packages available. At launch, a 100th Anniversary Special Commemorative Vehicle special edition variant was available, to commemorate the 100th anniversary since the founding as its predecessor Toyo Cork Kogyo Company, Limited in 1920. The e-Skyactiv-G M Hybrid powertrain was marketed first, as it was easy option for many consumers and battery electric vehicles were not high selling compared to hybrid electric vehicles.

In January 2021, the MX-30 EV was released in Japan with three trim levels available at launch: EV, EV Basic Set, and EV Highest Set.

In November 2023, the MX-30 with the e-Skyactiv-R powertrain was introduced in Japan as the Rotary Plug-in Hybrid, with a special edition Edition R variant available.

==== Malaysia ====
The MX-30 EV was launched in Malaysia on 29 June 2022, with deliveries began in January 2023, with two trim levels: Mid and High.

==== Singapore ====
The MX-30 EV was launched at the Singapore Motor Show on 16 January 2023, in a sole variant.

=== Europe ===
The MX-30 was introduced for the Europe region in the third quarter of 2020. Two powertrain options were available: e-Skyactiv (BEV) and e-Skyactiv-R (PHEV).

=== North America ===
The MX-30 EV went on sale in USA in August 2021 with sales limited to the state of California, where it was a low range, high cost compliance car, available only in the Premium Plus package. In July 2023, the MX-30 was discontinued in the USA due to slow sales of less than 600 units and Mazda USA focusing on introducing newer hybrid cars.

The MX-30 EV went on sale in Canada in February 2022, with two trim levels: GS and GT. It was discontinued there at the end of the 2024 model year.

=== Oceania ===
==== Australia ====
The MX-30 went on sale in Australia in April 2021, with three trim levels available at launch: Evolve, Touring, and Astina. Two powertrain options are available: e-Skyactiv-G M Hybrid (G20e) and the battery electric e-Skyactiv (E35), the latter powertrain comes exclusively in the Astina trim that shortly went on sale in August 2021. The MX-30 was discontinued in Australia in early 2024.

==== New Zealand ====
The MX-30 was launched in New Zealand in May 2021 in a sole variant, the e-Skyactiv BEV in the Takami trim. In October 2021, the e-Skyactiv-G M Hybrid powertrain in the Limited trim followed.

== Safety ==
The Mazda MX-30 received a 5-star rating by the Euro NCAP in 2020. It was also the first car to achieve a maximum rating under the new Euro NCAP criteria.

Euro NCAP test results Mazda MX-30 (2020)
Test	Points	%
Overall:	5 /5 stars	
Adult occupant:	34.6	91%
Child occupant:	42.8	87%
Pedestrian:	37.0	68%
Safety assist:	11.8	73%

ANCAP test results Mazda MX-30 (2020, aligned with Euro NCAP)
Test	Points	%
Overall:	5 /5 stars	
Adult occupant:	35.64	93%
Child occupant:	43.01	87%
Pedestrian:	36.99	68%
Safety assist:	11.94	74%

== Sales ==
Year	Europe	Japan	U.S.	Canada
2020	9,477	2,587		
2021	12,249	4,655	61	148
2022	5,849	1,829	324	812
2023			100	662

== Awards and reviews ==
The MX-30 made the 10 Best List of the 2020-2021 Car of the Year Japan Awards. It also won the 2020 Red Dot Design Award in the Electric Vehicle category.

Nonprofit consumer organisation Consumer Reports stated, "With such a small battery, the EPA-estimated range is a scant 100 miles. That would have been competitive a decade ago, but it's not in today's EV market." CR called it a "strange little car" and found the vehicle noisy but applauded fit and finish and said it was "a fun little handler."
