= Egress =

Egress may refer to:

- Ingress, egress, and regress, legal terms referring to an individual's right to travel or move
- Egress (signal leakage), the passage of electromagnetic fields through the shield of a coaxial cable
- Egress filtering, in computer networking, monitoring and/or restricting the flow of outbound information
- Egress Software, a British provider of data security services
- Interior and exterior egress, two of the four contacts observed during an astronomical transit

== See also ==
- Egressive sound, a type of sound in human speech
- Egressive case, a type of grammatical case
- Exit (disambiguation)
- Ingress (disambiguation)
