= Ingress =

Ingress may refer to:

== Science and technology ==
- Ingress (signal leakage), the passage of an outside signal into a coaxial cable
- Ingress filtering, a computer network packet filtering technique
- Ingress protection rating, a protection level that electrical appliances provide against intrusion of physical objects
- Ingress router, a source label switch router
- Ingress cancellation, a technology to digitally remove in-channel ingress

== Legal ==
- Ingress, egress, and regress, property law terms
- Ingress into India Ordinance, 1914

== Others ==
- Ingress (video game), a 2013 geolocation-based video game
- Ingress (TV series), a 2018 Japanese anime series based on the video game
- Ingress, Kent, England
- Ingress Bell (1837–1914), English architect

== See also ==
- Jean-Auguste-Dominique Ingres (1780–1867), French Neoclassical painter
- Ingres (disambiguation)
- Ingression (disambiguation)
- Egress (disambiguation)
