= Mazda CX-60 =

Mid-size crossover SUV

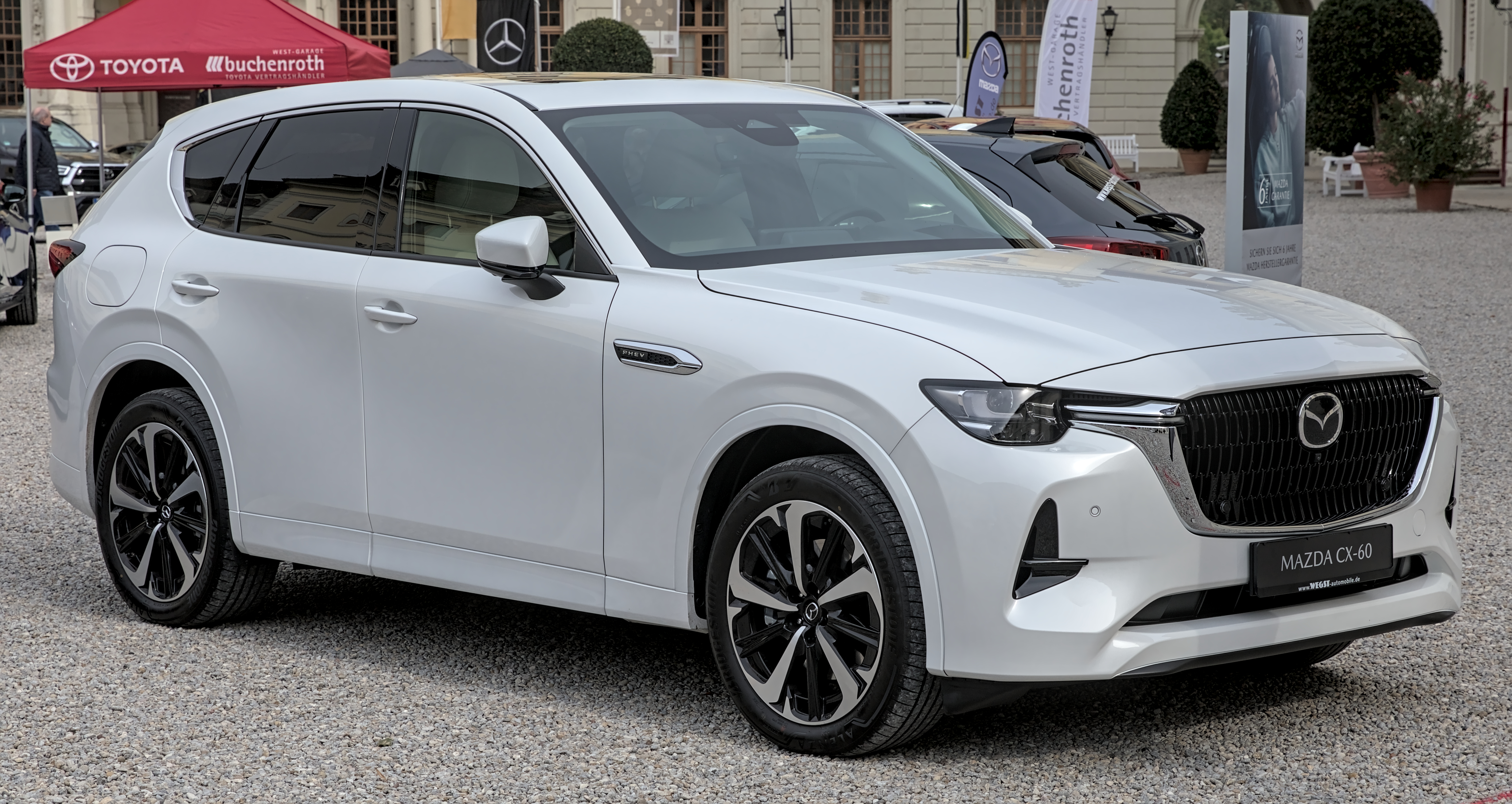
- 2022 Mazda CX-60 PHEV

Overview
- Manufacturer: Mazda
- Model code: KH
- Production: March 2022 – present
- Assembly: Japan: Hōfu (Hōfu Plant No. 2)
- Designer: Ren Inoue, Keisuke Watanabe

Body and chassis
- Class: Mid-size crossover SUV
- Body style: 5-door SUV
- Layout: Front-engine, rear-wheel-drive; Front-engine, all-wheel-drive (i-Activ AWD)
- Platform: Large Product Group
- Related: Mazda CX-80; Mazda CX-70/CX-90

Powertrain
- Engine: Petrol: 2.5 L Skyactiv-G PY-VPS I4; 3.3 L e-Skyactiv G H3T turbo I6; Petrol plug-in hybrid: (PHEV); 2.5 L e-Skyactiv PHEV PY-VPS I4; Diesel: 3.3 L e-Skyactiv D T3-VPTS turbo I6
- Electric motor: M Hybrid Boost integrated starter generator (mild hybrid); Synchronous, permanent magnet (PHEV)
- Transmission: 8-speed Skyactiv-Drive automatic
- Hybrid drivetrain: Mild hybrid; Plug-in hybrid
- Battery: 0.33 kWh (mild hybrid); 17.8 kWh lithium-ion (PHEV)
- Electric range: 60 km (37 mi) (PHEV)

Dimensions
- Wheelbase: 2,870 mm (113.0 in)
- Length: 4,740–4,745 mm (186.6–186.8 in)
- Width: 1,890 mm (74.4 in)
- Height: 1,670–1,685 mm (65.7–66.3 in)
- Kerb weight: 1,680–2,072 kg (3,704–4,568 lb)

The Mazda CX-60 is a mid-size crossover SUV produced by the Japanese automobile manufacturer Mazda since 2022. It is the first vehicle to use Mazda's rear- and all-wheel drive platform with longitudinal engine layout categorised as Large Product Group, which includes a line-up of straight-six engines. It is also the first Mazda vehicle to feature a plug-in hybrid option.

The CX-60 is marketed in Europe, Japan, Australia and several other markets, while North America receives the CX-70, which is essentially a CX-90 without third row seating. By size, it is larger than the CX-5 and smaller than the CX-9. It is comparable in size to the CX-50, and wider but shorter in length than the CX-8.

== Background ==
The CX-60 was revealed on 8 March 2022 as part of Mazda's newly established "Large Product Group", which includes a line-up of larger vehicles using rear- and all-wheel drive layout. Due to the switch to the rear-wheel drive-based layout with longitudinal engine, Mazda is positioning the model upmarket towards vehicles from the more premium segment. Mazda Australia executive, Vinesh Bhindi, described it as a "technical tour de force" and a "step change for Mazda".

The model is a two-row vehicle which uses rear-biased, full-time all-wheel drive marketed as "i-Activ AWD" which is standard in most markets. By adopting a longitudinal engine layout, the front suspension of the CX-60 feature a double wishbone setup, while the rear gets an independent multi-link suspension.

Ceremony of the mass production of the CX-60 was held in late April 2022 in Japan, at Mazda Hofu Plant No. 2 in the Yamaguchi Prefecture. According to Mazda, production of the CX-60 for the European market began on March 15.

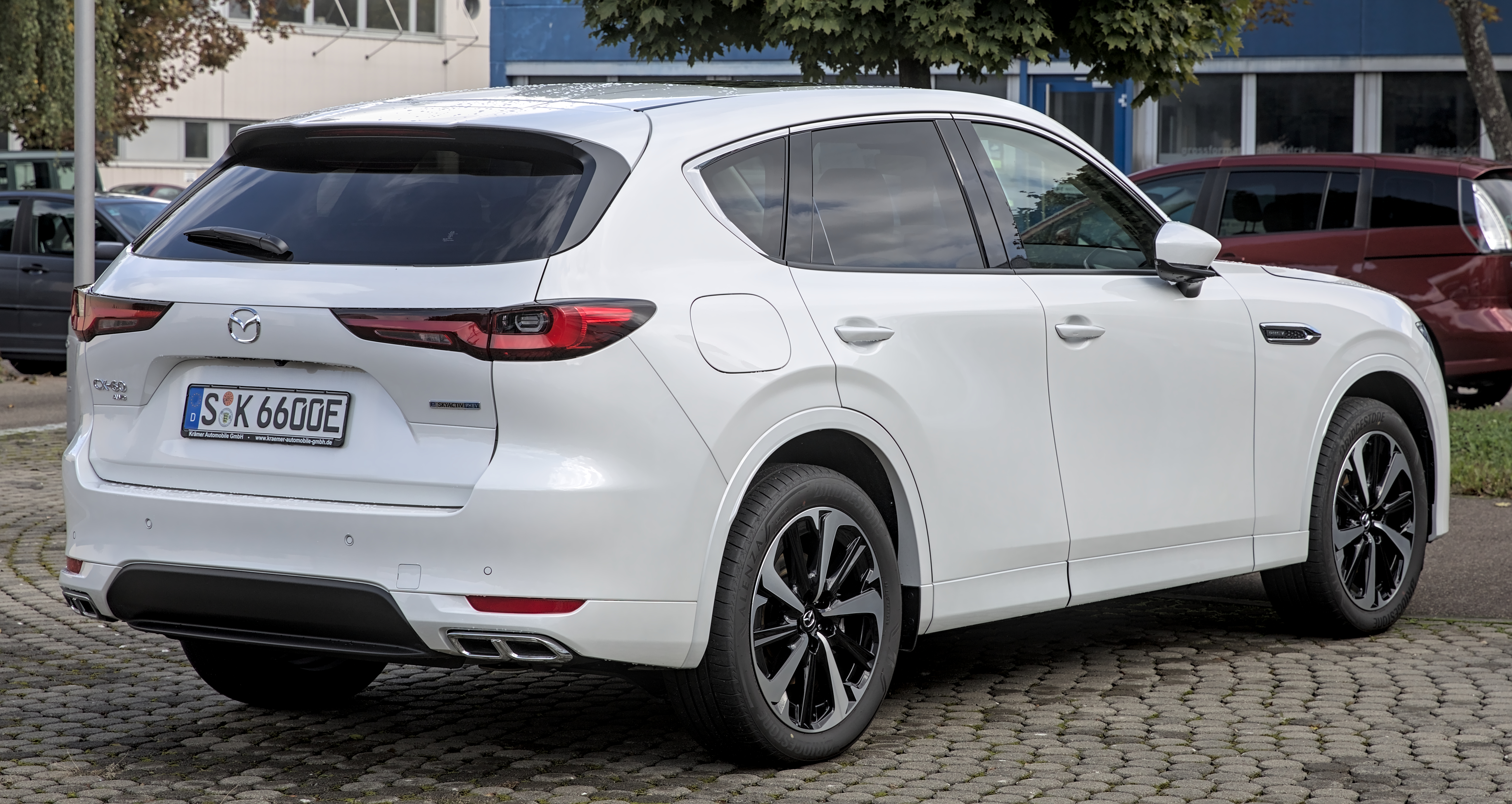
Rear view

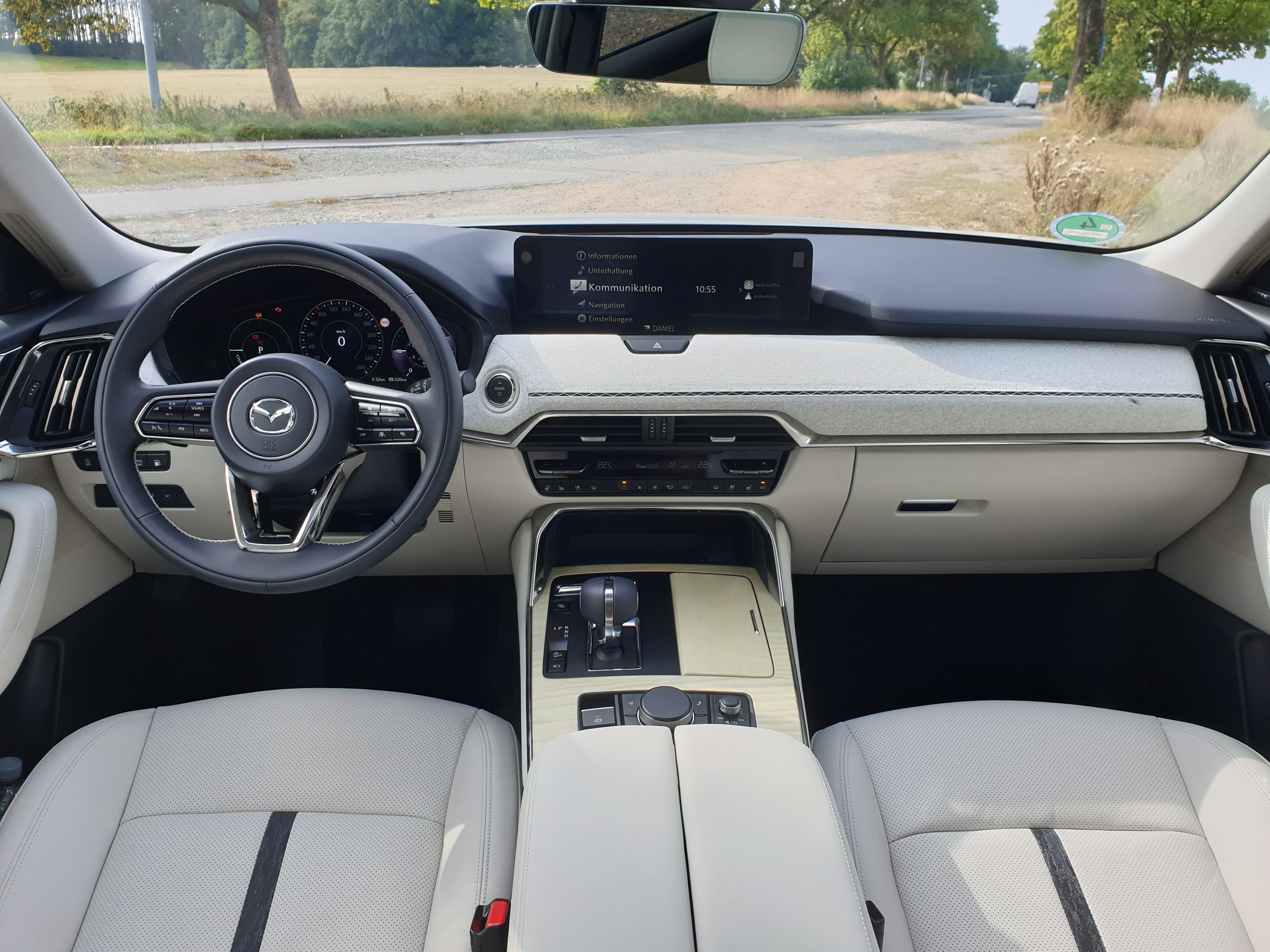
Interior

== Equipment ==
The driver cockpit area is equipped with three displays, consisting of a full TFT LCD instrument cluster, a window head-up display (HUD) and a 12.3-inch Mazda Connect centre display without touchscreen functionality; the display can be operated through a "command control" knob.

The CX-60 is equipped with Driver Personalisation System which comprises three functions. The first function is an automatic driving position guide that uses a camera to detect the position of the driver's eyes and estimates the driver's height, then automatically adjusts the seat, steering wheel, head-up display and side mirrors accordingly. Automatic setting restoration uses facial recognition to determine which user is driving, then matches it with adjustments and settings stored in the vehicle including the driving position, audio and AC. The system can store settings for up to six people, plus guests. The last function is an ingress/egress assistance that slides the steering wheel and seat automatically when the driver is entering or exiting the vehicle.

The vehicle also features Kinematic Posture Control system which gently applies the brakes to the inside rear wheel to contain body roll.

== Markets ==
=== Asia ===
==== Cambodia ====
The CX-60 was launched in Cambodia in May 2023, offered in the entry-level Evolve variant powered by a 2.5L Skyactiv-G petrol engine with rear-wheel drive. For the 2026 model year, the Cambodian lineup was updated to the SE trim, with all-wheel drive became standard.

==== Indonesia ====
The CX-60 was launched in Indonesia on 26 July 2023, with two trim levels: Elite and Kuro Edition. Both trims are powered by a 3.3L e-Skyactiv-G mild hybrid petrol with standard all-wheel-drive. The Pro trim which uses the 2.5L Skyactiv-G petrol standard with all-wheel drive was added in July 2024. The entry-level Sport trim which uses the 2.5L Skyactiv-G petrol standard with rear-wheel drive was added in July 2025.

==== Japan ====
The CX-60 for the Japanese market was detailed in April 2022. It is offered with four powertrains, consisting of the base Skyactiv-G 2.5L petrol (25S), Skyactiv-D 3.3L diesel (XD), e-Skyactiv D 3.3 diesel mild hybrid (XD-Hybrid), and a 2.5 petrol plug-in hybrid. Two-wheel drive is available for the 25S and XD.

==== Malaysia ====
The CX-60 was previewed in Malaysia at the 2024 Kuala Lumpur International Mobility Show in December 2024, with pre-orders began in June 2025, and was launched in Malaysia on 3 September 2025. It is available in the sole 2.5 2WD High variant powered by the 2.5L Skyactiv-G petrol with rear-wheel drive. In June 2026, the 3.3G AWD High Plus variant powered by the 3.3L e-Skyactiv-G mild hybrid petrol was introduced to the line-up.

==== Philippines ====
The CX-60 was launched in the Philippines in June 2023, with two variants: the mild hybrid petrol 3.3L AWD HEV Turbo and the mild hybrid diesel 3.3L AWD HEV Turbo-D Sport.

==== Singapore ====
The CX-60 was launched in Singapore by Eurokars on 21 July 2023, in the sole variant powered by a 2.5L Skyactiv-G petrol.

==== Taiwan ====
The CX-60 was launched in Taiwan on 31 October 2023, with four variants: 25S Elite, 25S Elite Plus, 25S AWD Exclusive, and 33T AWD Exclusive Sport. It is offered with two powertrains: Skyactiv-G 2.5L petrol (25S) and a 3.3L e-Skyactiv-G mild hybrid petrol (33T), with all-wheel drive standard on the latter powertrain. In November 2024, the CX-60 line-up was updated for the 2025 model year which saw the introduction of a new Starry Blue exterior color option and equipment changes.

==== Vietnam ====
The CX-60 was launched in Vietnam on 20 June 2026, in the sole 3.3T HEV variant powered by a 3.3L e-Skyactiv-G mild hybrid petrol with standard all-wheel drive.

=== Europe ===
The CX-60 was available in Europe from April 2022 in the sole powertrain, the 2.5L e-Skyactiv PHEV petrol. In July 2022, Mazda introduced two diesel engine options, consisting of the e-Skyactiv D 3.3L diesel mild hybrid with two different tunings labeled as the 200 and 254, producing 147 kW (197 hp; 200 PS) and 187 kW (251 hp; 254 PS), respectively. In this market, the CX-60 is available in four specifications: Prime, Exclusive, Takumi and Homura.

=== Latin America ===
==== Chile ====
The CX-60 was launched in Chile on 16 June 2023, with three trim levels: Prime, Premium and Signature. The Prime trim with the 2.5L Skyactiv-G petrol engine, the Premium trim with either the 3.3L e-Skyactiv-G petrol or the e-Skyactiv-D mild hybrid diesel variants, and the Signature trim with the 2.5L e-Skyactiv PHEV petrol.

=== Oceania ===
==== Australia ====
Pricing and specifications of the CX-60 for Australia were announced in November 2022, with sales beginning in June 2023. Three trim levels are available: Evolve, GT, and Azami. Packages include Vision Technology, Luxury, Takumi, and SP; the former two are standard on the Azami grade. Three powertrains are available for each grade: a 3.3L e-Skyactiv-G mild hybrid petrol (G40e), a 3.3L e-Skyactiv-D mild hybrid diesel (D50e), and a 2.5L e-Skyactiv PHEV petrol (P50e), with all wheel drive coming standard for all variants.

The (P50e) PHEV petrol accounted for approximately 40% of pre-orders, while the (G40e) petrol and (D50e) diesel made up the rest of the pre-orders in the ratio of 2:1 (40% and 20%). Targeted monthly sales were set at 500 units.

The CX-60 line-up in Australia was updated in May 2025. The changes include the addition of Pure and Touring trims, the Vision Technology package became standard on the Evolve trim and above, and Mazda address complaints regarding "[the vehicle's] ride quality and transmission".

In August 2025, the 2.5L Skyactiv-G petrol (G25) with rear-wheel drive was introduced in Australia for the Pure, Evolve and Touring trims.

==== New Zealand ====
The CX-60 was launched alongside the CX-90 in New Zealand in September 2023, with three trim levels available: Touring, Homura and Takami. It is offered with two powertrains: 2.5L e-Skyactiv PHEV petrol and 3.3L e-Skyactiv-D mild hybrid diesel (only for Homura grade).

=== South Africa ===
The CX-60 was launched in South Africa on 5 May 2023, with two trim levels: Dynamic and Individual. It is powered by a 2.5L Skyactiv-G petrol engine, with all-wheel-drive standard on latter grade. There had been 600 units allocated within the first year of launch.

In March 2024, the Takumi grade was added to the line-up, powered by a 3.3L e-Skyactiv-D mild hybrid diesel standard with all-wheel drive.

== Powertrain ==
The petrol plug-in hybrid (PHEV) model was the first variant to be released. It uses the existing 2.5-litre Skyactiv-G engine combined with an electric motor and a lithium-ion battery which resulted in combined outputs of 241 kW (323 hp; 328 PS) and 500 N⋅m (51.0 kg⋅m; 369 lb⋅ft) of torque. It has a towing capacity of 2,500 kg (5,512 lb) with a claimed 0–100 km/h (0–62 mph) figure of 5.8 seconds. Electric only mode top speed is 140 km/h (87 mph). Mazda claimed that the electric-only range is rated at 60 km (37 mi). The 17.8 kWh battery can be charged in just four hours from empty to full, if connected to a normal AC charging socket capable of 220 V power.

Other engine options include two newly developed units, which are 3.3-litre e-Skyactiv D diesel and 3.0-litre e-Skyactiv X petrol with Spark Controlled Compression Ignition (SPCCI) technology, both are straight six-cylinder units with 48 V mild hybrid system and was released in late 2022 and 2023 respectively. In October 2022, a 3.3-litre Skyactiv-G turbocharged petrol engine was announced for some markets such as Australia, producing 209 kW (280 hp; 284 PS).

The diesel engine equipped to the CX-60 features Distribution Controlled Partially Premixed Compression Ignition (DCPCI) technology. An egg-shaped combustion chambers would split the premixed air-fuel mixture into two regions inside the piston bowl. It is aimed to achieve cleaner combustion in every engine speeds and providing better fuel efficiency. Mazda claimed that the six-cylinder diesel engine is one of the cleanest diesel engines in the world with a thermal efficiency of over 40 per cent. With this diesel engine, the fuel economy of the CX-60 is rated up to 19.8 km/l (47 mpg_{‑US}; 5.1 l/100 km) under WLTC standards.

For mild hybrid models, Mazda adopted a 48 V mild hybrid system named the M Hybrid Boost. It consists of a 0.33 kWh lithium-ion battery, an inverter, a DC-to-DC converter and an electric motor/generator rated at 12 kW (16 hp; 16 PS) and 153 N⋅m (15.6 kg⋅m; 113 lb⋅ft) integrated into the transmission. The electric motor supports the engine at low loads and low engine speeds, thus improving efficiency in short distances. The battery can be recharged by the engine or via regenerative braking. If the battery is full, the surplus energy is used to power in-car electrical components.

Every model of the CX-60 is equipped with an 8-speed automatic gearbox with a multi-plate clutch and integrated electric motor/generator which replaces hydraulic converter as an input clutch in order to preserve the cornering performance of a rear-wheel drive system. The placement of the transmission was optimised to minimise the transmission tunnel width, allowing for more ideal pedal and seat placement and larger knee space beside the centre console.

Type	Model	Engine code	Displ.	Power	Torque	Electric motor	Battery	Trans.	Layout	Cal. years
Petrol	Skyactiv-G 2.5	PY-VPS	2,488 cc (2.5 L) I4	138 kW (185 hp; 188 PS) @ 6,000 rpm	250 N⋅m (25.5 kg⋅m; 184 lb⋅ft) @ 3,000 rpm	—N/a	—N/a	8-speed 8EC-AT automatic	RWD	2022–present
Petrol	Skyactiv-G 2.5	PY-VPS	2,488 cc (2.5 L) I4	138 kW (185 hp; 188 PS) @ 6,000 rpm	250 N⋅m (25.5 kg⋅m; 184 lb⋅ft) @ 3,000 rpm	—N/a	—N/a	8-speed 8EC-AT automatic	AWD	2022–present
Petrol mild hybrid	e-Skyactiv G 3.3	H3T	3,283 cc (3.3 L) turbo I6	209 kW (280 hp; 284 PS) @ 5,000–6,000 rpm	450 N⋅m (45.9 kg⋅m; 332 lb⋅ft) @ 2,000–3,500 rpm	MR M Hybrid Boost ISG	0.33 kWh lithium-ion	8-speed 8EC-AT automatic	AWD	2022–present
Petrol plug-in hybrid	e-Skyactiv PHEV	PY-VPS	2,488 cc (2.5 L) I4	Combined: 241 kW (323 hp; 328 PS) Engine: 138 kW (185 hp; 188 PS) @ 6,000 rpm Motor: 129 kW (173 hp; 175 PS)	Combined: 500 N⋅m (51.0 kg⋅m; 369 lb⋅ft) Engine: 250 N⋅m (25.5 kg⋅m; 184 lb⋅ft) @ 4,000 rpm Motor: 270 N⋅m (27.5 kg⋅m; 199 lb⋅ft)	MS permanent magnet synchronous	17.8 kWh lithium-ion	8-speed 8EC-AT automatic	AWD	2022–present
Diesel	e-Skyactiv D 3.3	T3-VPTS	3,283 cc (3.3 L) turbo I6	170 kW (228 hp; 231 PS) @ 4,000–4,200 rpm	500 N⋅m (51.0 kg⋅m; 369 lb⋅ft) @ 1,500–3,000 rpm	—N/a	—N/a	8-speed 8EC-AT automatic	RWD	2022–present
Diesel	e-Skyactiv D 3.3	T3-VPTS	3,283 cc (3.3 L) turbo I6	170 kW (228 hp; 231 PS) @ 4,000–4,200 rpm	500 N⋅m (51.0 kg⋅m; 369 lb⋅ft) @ 1,500–3,000 rpm	—N/a	—N/a	8-speed 8EC-AT automatic	AWD	2022–present
Diesel mild hybrid	e-Skyactiv D 3.3	T3-VPTS	3,283 cc (3.3 L) turbo I6	Engine: 147 kW (197 hp; 200 PS) @ 3,600–4,200 rpm Motor: 12 kW (16 hp; 16 PS)	Engine: 450 N⋅m (45.9 kg⋅m; 332 lb⋅ft) @ 1,400–3,000 rpm Motor: 153 N⋅m (15.6 kg⋅m; 113 lb⋅ft)	MR M Hybrid Boost ISG	0.33 kWh lithium-ion	8-speed 8EC-AT automatic	RWD	2022–present (Europe)
Diesel mild hybrid	e-Skyactiv D 3.3	T3-VPTS	3,283 cc (3.3 L) turbo I6	Engine: 187 kW (251 hp; 254 PS) @ 3,750 rpm Motor: 12 kW (16 hp; 16 PS)	Engine: 550 N⋅m (56.1 kg⋅m; 406 lb⋅ft) @ 1,500–2,400 rpm Motor: 153 N⋅m (15.6 kg⋅m; 113 lb⋅ft)	MR M Hybrid Boost ISG	0.33 kWh lithium-ion	8-speed 8EC-AT automatic	AWD	2022–present

== Reception ==
The CX-60 has been compared to premium SUVs such as the BMW X3, Mercedes-Benz GLC, Audi Q5 and Lexus NX, in addition to SUVs from regular 'mainstream' brands. According to Australian publication CarExpert, the CX-60 straddles between "the mainstream and premium mid-size SUV segments", and looked like "it's gunning for the Germans". CarExpert noted its firm suspension that fails to dampen "road imperfections". Top Gear says Mazda is pitching the CX-60 directly at the BMW X3, while noting its cheaper price. The publication praised the efficiency of the plug-in hybrid model, while criticised the dynamics and stability of the CX-60 in comparison to the X3, concluding that "the CX-60 lacks that sense that it's been developed with absolute attention to detail."

== Safety ==
In a Euro NCAP testing conducted in 2022, the CX-60 received a five-star rating.

Euro NCAP test results Mazda CX-60 (2022)
Test	Points	%
Overall:	5 /5 stars	
Adult occupant:	33.8	88%
Child occupant:	45.0	91%
Pedestrian:	48.2	89%
Safety assist:	12.2	76%

ANCAP test results Mazda CX-60 (2022, aligned with Euro NCAP)
Test	Points	%
Overall:	5 /5 stars	
Adult occupant:	34.82	91%
Child occupant:	46	93%
Pedestrian:	48.18	89%
Safety assist:	12.32	77%

== Sales ==
Year	Japan	Europe (Note: Europe: 2020 EU 27 + UK + Switzerland + Norway + Iceland)	Australia	Indonesia
2022	5,774	12,170		
2023	23,941		2,779	125
2024	6,395		4,058	257
