= Deflect.ca =

DDoS mitigation and website security service

- Type: Social Enterprise
- Industry: Internet; Cloud computing; Internet freedom
- Founded: 2011; 15 years ago
- Founder: Dmitri Vitaliev
- Headquarters: Montréal, Canada
- Area served: Worldwide
- Products: Internet Security, Managed Hosting, Web caching
- Services: Reverse proxy; DDoS mitigation; Dedicated hosting service
- Website: deflect.ca

Deflect is a DDoS mitigation and website security service by eQualitie, a Canadian social enterprise developing open and reusable systems with a focus on privacy, resilience and self-determination, to protect and promote human rights and press freedom online.

== History ==
Deflect was founded by digital security expert and trainer Dmitri Vitaliev and Canadian internet entrepreneur David Mason in 2011. The Deflect project predates similar initiatives by Google's Project Shield and Cloudflare's Project Galileo. The initiative was created in response to an influential report by the Berkman Center for Internet & Society which highlighted the prevalence of DDoS as a means of political repression and censorship against independent media and human rights groups around the world, and recommended practical methods to protect websites from future incidents. The company claims to reach approximately 2% of the population connected to the Internet on an annual basis

Deflect offers free services to many civil society organizations and commercial plans for small business and enterprise.

In 2016, the Deflect team released its first investigative report into attacks against a Ukrainian independent media website. ""On 2 February, the Kotsubynske website published an article from a meeting of the regional administrative council where it stated that members of the political party 'New Faces' were interfering with and trying to sabotage the council's work on stopping deforestation. Attacks against the website begin thereafter."

Also in 2016, CBC News noted that Deflect thwarted DDoS attacks for Black Lives Matter. Investigations led by the Deflect team to discover the methods and provenance of over a hundred separate incidents against the Black Lives Matter website, were noted in The Verge, Ars Technica and BoingBoing.

In 2019, the Deflect team discovered a persistent cyber offensive campaign against Uzbek human rights activists, leading to a more detailed study by Amnesty International. Other instances of intervention for which Deflect has received recognition for include the Gamergate, the 2012 Rakhine State riots, the 2013 Iranian presidential election and the FIFA corruption conspiracy.

In 2017, Scott Neigh, host of podcast Talking Radical Radio, spoke with founder Dmitri Vitaliev about how Deflect.ca defends social movements against digital threats.

By 2020, the Washington Post reported that Deflect.ca was protecting over 500 vulnerable civil society organizations.

== See also ==
- Denial-of-service attack
- DDoS mitigation
