= EQualitie =

Canadian digital security organization

eQualitie
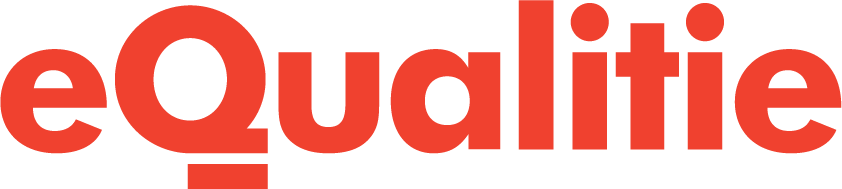
- Type: Not-for-Profit
- Industry: Technology, Human Rights, Press Freedom
- Founded: 2011; 15 years ago
- Founder: Dmitri Vitaliev
- Headquarters: Montreal, Canada
- Area served: World
- Products: Deflect; CENO
- Services: DDoS mitigation; Censorship circumvention; Information security
- Website: equalit.ie

eQualitie is a Canadian digital security organisation focused on the development and distribution of free, open-source software, services and security training to civil society, NGO's, investigative journalists and independent media to protect and promote human rights and press freedom online. The group is based in Montreal, Canada.

== History ==
The group was founded in 2011 by ethical hacker, digital security entrepreneur and journalist Dmitri Vitaliev.

Principally known for its DDoS mitigation service Deflect, the group also provides circumvention tools for users operating inside National Intranets and digital security training to activists and journalists. eQualitie has helped establish digital security schools in Ukraine and Colombia. They have also become known for assisting site owners defending themselves against Social engineering attacks.

eQualitie has also been acknowledged by the think tank and media organisation Osservatorio Balcani e Caucaso Transeuropa for its help, contributed to a UN report on digital safety for journalists and regularly participates at the Internet Governance Forum

eQualitie is a member of the Association for Progressive Communications and works closely with fellow members on digital security and DDoS mitigation.

The company distributes the code for all its tools on GitHub and frequently publishes detailed reports on the performance of these tools and services
