= Ingres (disambiguation) =

Jean-Auguste-Dominique Ingres (1780–1867) was a French painter.

Ingres may also refer to:

- Ingres (database)
- Rémi Ingres (b. 1969), French speed skater
- Ingres paper, a type of drawing paper

== See also ==
- Musée Ingres
- Ingress
