= Hofu (Mazda factory) =

Automobile manufacturing complex in Hōfu, Japan

Coordinates: 34°1′13.89″N 131°30′57.4″E

The Hofu Plant is a complex of manufacturing facilities operated by Mazda in Hōfu in the Yamaguchi Prefecture of Japan. The complex comprises three plants. The oldest, located in the Nakanoseki district, opened in 1981 and produces transmissions. Hōfu Plant No. 1, Mazda's first automobile assembly plant outside Hiroshima Plant, opened in 1982 in the Nishinoura district. A second automobile assembly plant, Hōfu Plant No. 2, opened in 1992.

== Nakanoseki ==
The Nakanoseki plant opened in December 1981 and covers an area of 537,000 square metres (5,780,000 sq ft). It produces both automatic and manual transmissions. In September 2006, Mazda announced that the plant had produced its 25 millionth transmission, a milestone achieved in 24 years and nine months.

== Nishinoura ==
The Nishinoura site includes two assembly plants, known as "H1" and "H2", with a combined floor area of approximately 792,000 square metres (8,530,000 sq ft).

=== H1 ===
The H1 plant opened in September 1982. As of March 2021, the plant had the capacity to produce 278,000 vehicles per year.

Current products

- Mazda2
- Mazda3
- Mazda CX-3, 2016–present

Former products

- Mazda Familia / 323 / Protegé
- Mazda MX-3

=== H2 ===
The H2 plant opened in February 1992. As of March 2021, the plant had the capacity to produce 138,000 vehicles per year.

Current products

- Mazda CX-5, 2017–present
- Mazda CX-60, 2022–present
- Mazda CX-70, 2024–present (export)
- Mazda CX-80, 2024–present
- Mazda CX-90, 2023–present (export)

Former products

- Mazda Atenza / Mazda6
- Mazda Capella / 626
- Mazda Xedos 6
- Mazda Tribute / Ford Escape, 2001–2006

== See also ==
- List of Mazda facilities
