= Ingression =

Ingression may refer to:

- Ingression (biology)
- Ingression coast

== See also ==
- Ingress (disambiguation)
- Ingressive sound
