= Mazda CX-90 =

Full-size crossover SUV

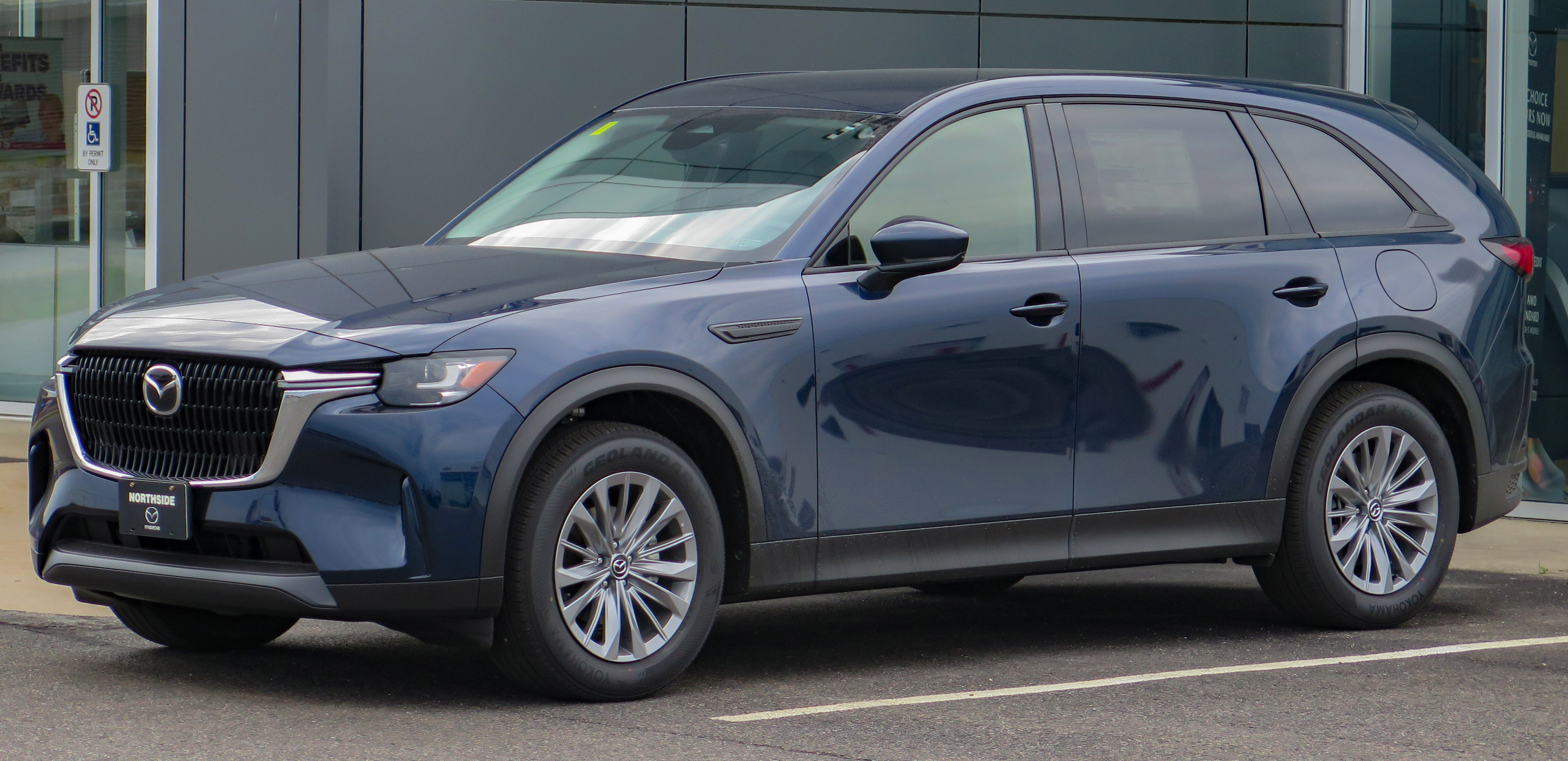
- 2024 Mazda CX-90 in Deep Crystal Blue Mica

Overview
- Manufacturer: Mazda
- Model code: KK (CX-90); KJ (CX-70)
- Also called: Mazda CX-70 (two-row version)
- Production: CX-90: April 2023 – present; CX-70: 2024–2026
- Model years: 2024–present (CX-90); 2025–2026 (CX-70)
- Assembly: Japan: Hōfu (Hōfu Plant No. 2)

Body and chassis
- Class: Full-size crossover SUV
- Body style: 5-door SUV
- Layout: Longitudinal front-engine, all-wheel-drive
- Platform: Large Product Group
- Related: Mazda CX-60; Mazda CX-80

Powertrain
- Engine: Gasoline: 3.3 L e-Skyactiv G H3T turbo I6; Gasoline plug-in hybrid: (PHEV); 2.5 L e-Skyactiv PHEV PY-VPS I4; Diesel: 3.3 L e-Skyactiv D T3-VPTS turbo I6
- Electric motor: M Hybrid Boost integrated starter generator (mild hybrid); Synchronous, permanent magnet (PHEV)
- Power output: 280 hp (209 kW) (e-Skyactiv G, standard output); 340 hp (254 kW) (e-Skyactiv G, high output); 323 hp (241 kW) (e-Skyactiv PHEV, combined system); 251 hp (187 kW) (e-Skyactiv D)
- Transmission: 8-speed Skyactiv-Drive automatic
- Hybrid drivetrain: Mild hybrid; Plug-in hybrid
- Battery: 0.33 kWh (mild hybrid); 17.8 kWh lithium-ion (PHEV)
- Electric range: 26 mi (42 km) (PHEV)

Dimensions
- Wheelbase: 3,120 mm (122.8 in)
- Length: 5,100–5,121 mm (200.8–201.6 in)
- Width: 1,994 mm (78.5 in)
- Height: 1,736–1,745 mm (68.3–68.7 in)
- Curb weight: 2,136–2,378 kg (4,709–5,243 lb)

Chronology
- Predecessor: Mazda CX-9

The Mazda CX-90 is a mid-size crossover SUV with three-row seating produced by Mazda, introduced in 2023. A two-row version, marketed separately as the Mazda CX-70, was introduced in 2024, featuring the same dimensions and engine options with minor styling variations. It is the largest SUV produced by the company and is built on the Large Product Group platform, which features a longitudinal engine and rear-biased all-wheel-drive system shared with the smaller CX-60.

The CX-90 replaced the CX-9 in North America, and like its predecessor, it is not marketed in Japan or Europe, despite being manufactured in Japan. Engine options include turbocharged, mild hybrid, inline-six engines (gasoline or diesel) and a plug-in hybrid gasoline inline-four. All powertrains are paired with an eight-speed automatic transmission that uses a wet clutch in place of a conventional torque converter.

== Overview ==
The CX-90 was revealed on 31 January 2023, for the North American market, while a release in the Australian and Middle Eastern markets occurred later during 2023. The CX-90 is available with a choice of six, seven, or eight-passenger seat configurations. The CX-70, the two-row variant with five seats, was revealed on 30 January 2024 in North America. The CX-70 differs from the CX-90 by its front and rear bumper designs, black exterior accents replacing chrome, unique wheel designs, and differing interior color scheme options.

With the use of the rear-wheel-drive-biased large vehicle platform, the CX-90 and CX-70 are placed into the brand's internal "Large Product Group" category. According to Mazda, the CX-90 addresses many of the weaknesses of the CX-9 such as its small interior space.

The CX-90 and CX-70 are also equipped with the Kinematic Posture Control technology, a feature originally developed for the 2022 MX-5 Miata and also present in the similar CX-60. The software suppresses the vehicle's body lift during cornering to improve stability and traction, helping occupants maintain a natural posture.

The CX-9 was discontinued in North America, replaced by the CX-90 and CX-70.

Mazda announced in October 2026 that the CX-70 would be discontinued in the United States for the 2027 model year, with its two-row configuration absorbed into the CX-90 lineup.

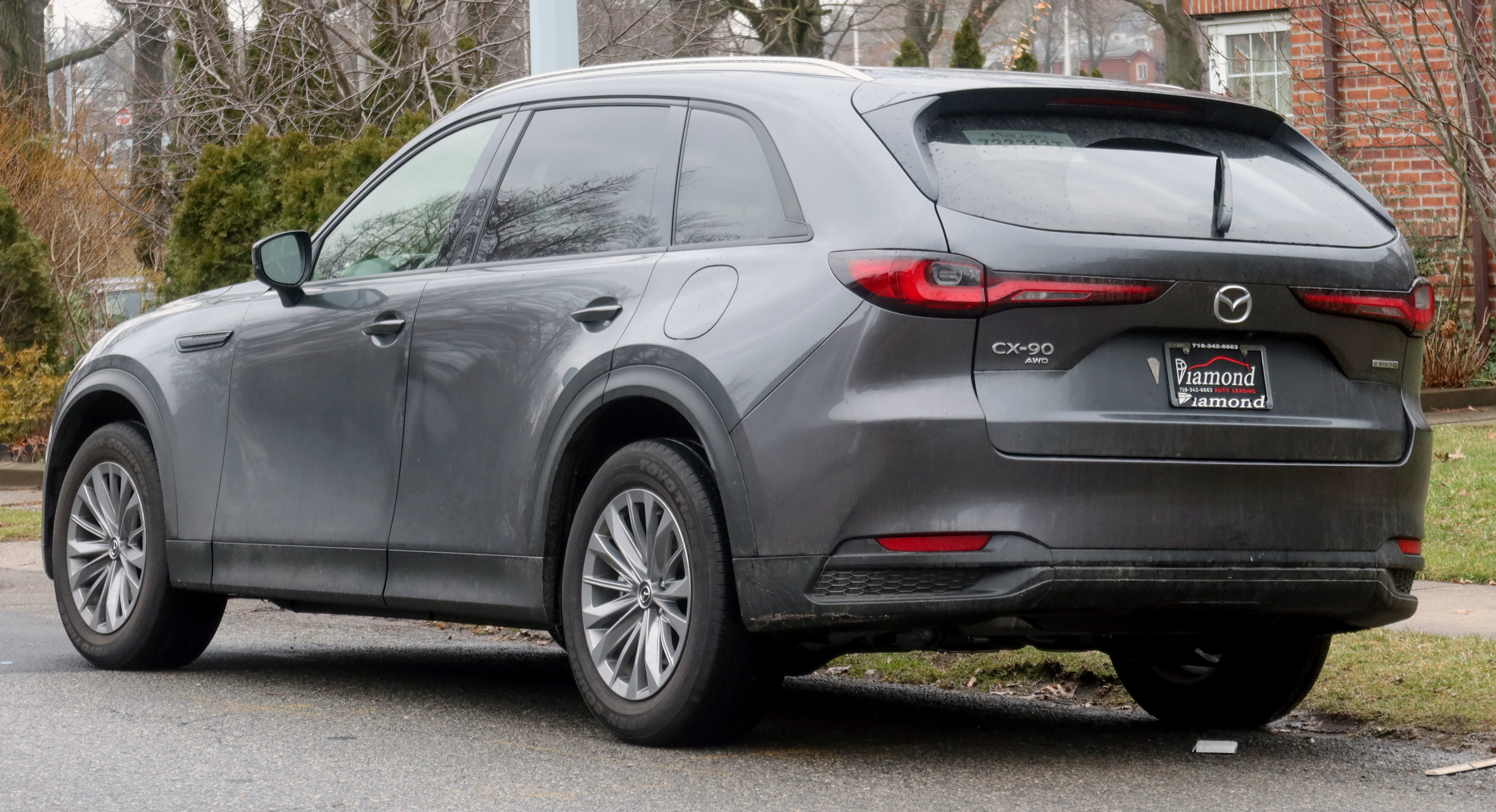
CX-90, rear view

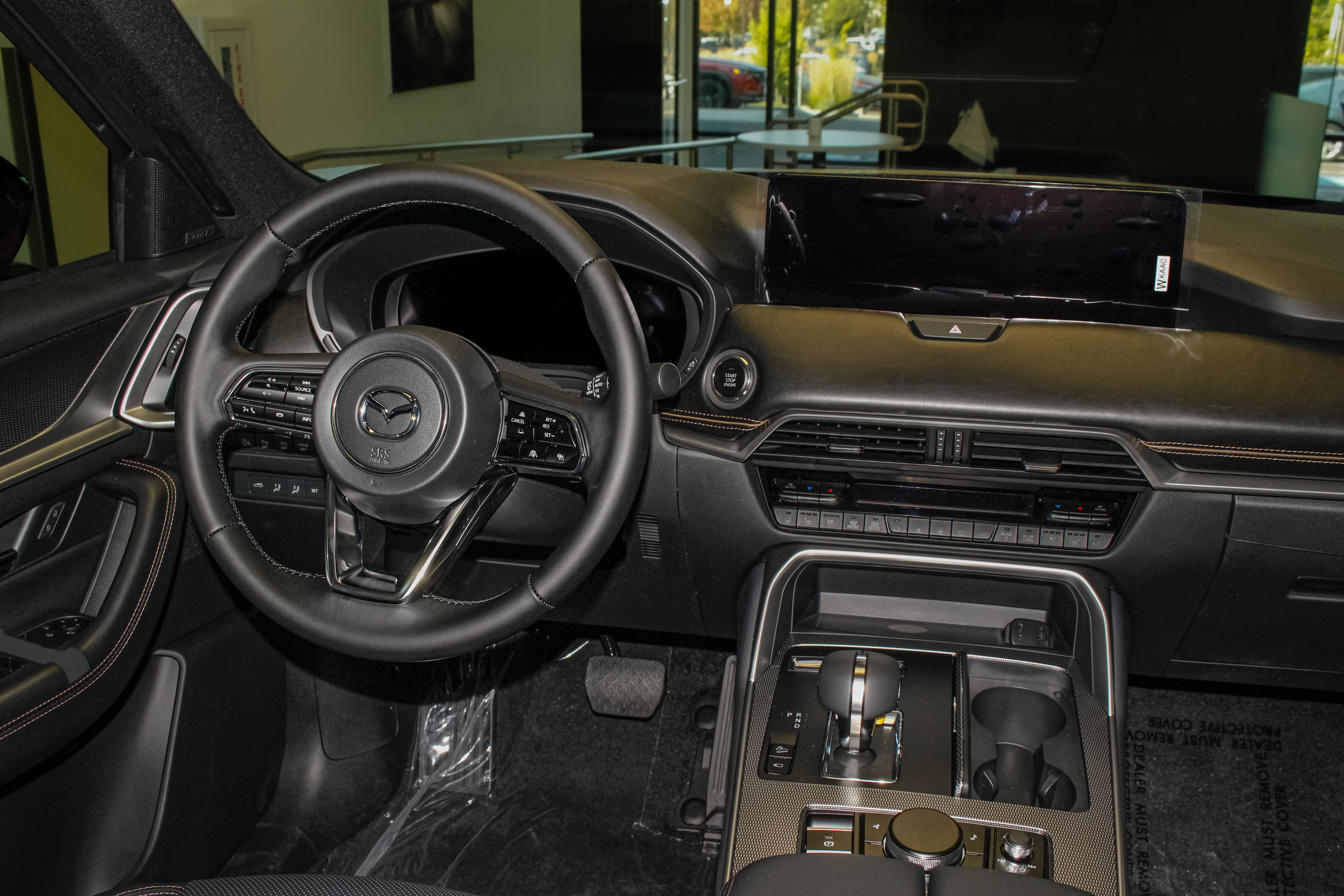
Interior

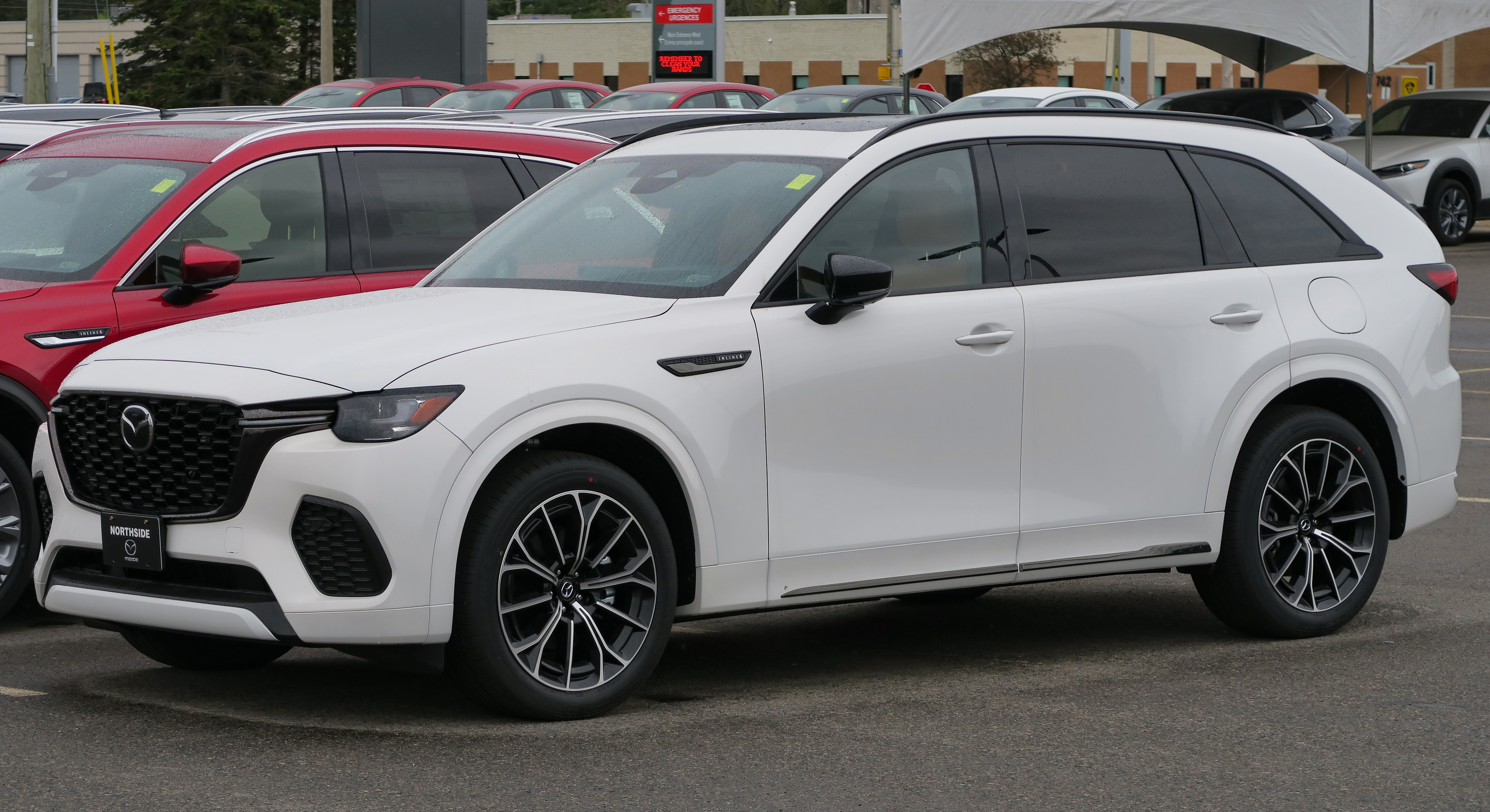
CX-70 (US)

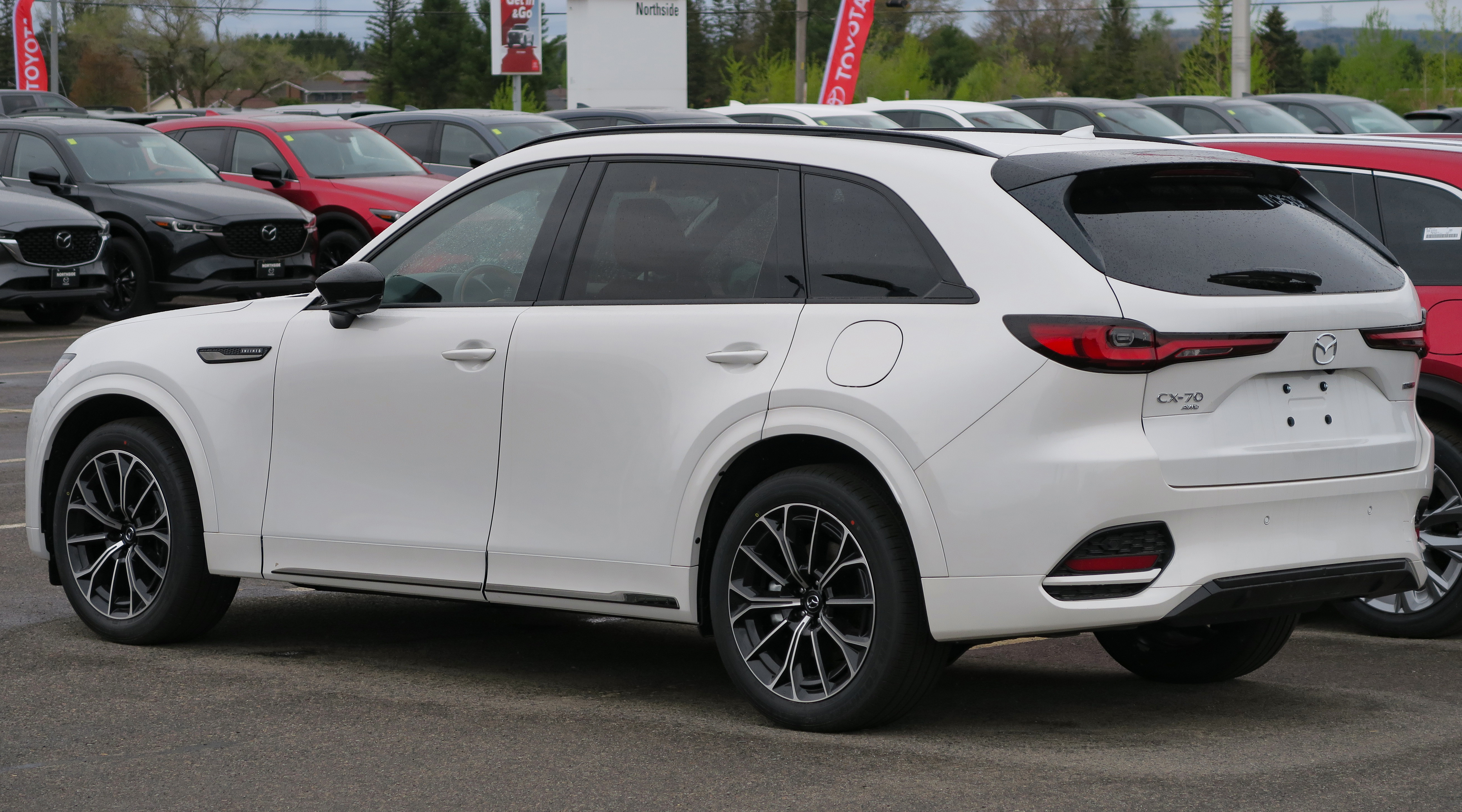
CX-70, rear view

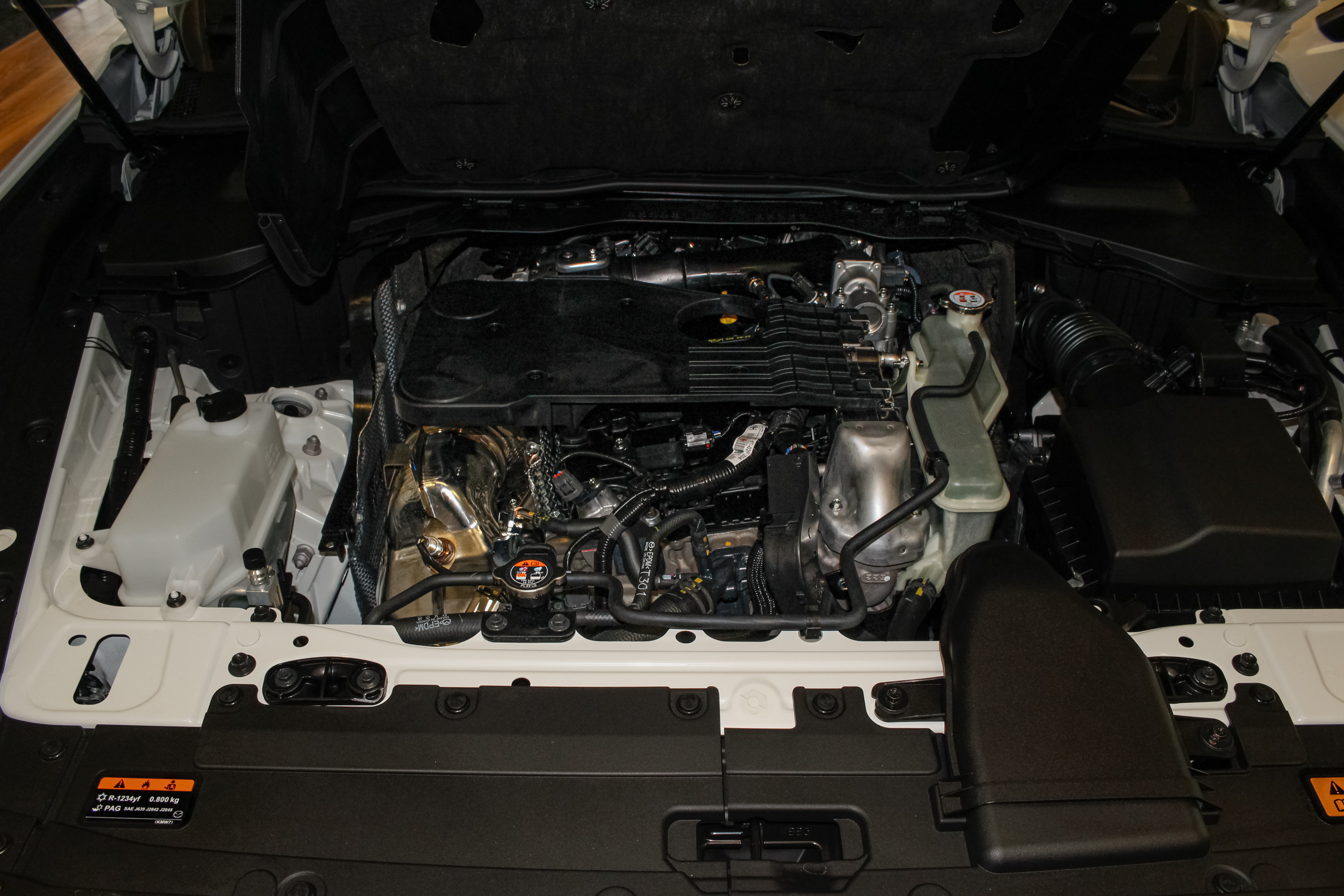
3.3 L e-Skyactiv G H3T turbo I6

== Markets ==
=== Asia ===
==== Cambodia ====
The CX-90 was launched in Cambodia on 18 November 2023, during an exclusive event held at the Mazda Mean Chey showroom in Phnom Penh. It is primarily offered in the high-specification Turbo S Premium Plus variant, powered by a 3.3-liter e-Skyactiv G mild hybrid gasoline and comes standard with all-wheel drive.

==== Philippines ====
The CX-90 was released in the Philippines on 22 September 2023, with two variants: Turbo and Turbo Exclusive. Both variants are solely powered by a 3.3-liter e-Skyactiv-G mild hybrid gasoline engine.

==== Taiwan ====
The CX-90 was launched in Taiwan on 22 May 2024, with three variants: 33T AWD Elite, 33T AWD Premium and 33T AWD Premium Captain Seat, all variants are solely powered by a 3.3-liter e-Skyactiv-G mild hybrid gasoline (33T) and comes standard with all-wheel drive. In January 2025, the CX-90 line-up was updated with nine airbags became standard for all variants and the Elite trim was replaced by the Elite Plus with the inclusion of new features.

==== Vietnam ====
The CX-90 was launched in Vietnam on 27 February 2026.Imported from Japan, in the sole 2.5 PHEV Signature AWD 7S variant powered by the 2.5-liter e-Skyactiv PHEV gasoline plug-in hybrid.

=== North America ===
The CX-90 was introduced to the North American market in April 2023.

In the United States, the initial trim levels for the inline-six models included Select, Preferred, Preferred Plus, Premium, Premium Plus, S, S Premium, and S Premium Plus. For the 2025 model year, the Preferred Plus, Premium, and S trims were discontinued, and a new Premium Sport trim was added. For plug-in hybrid models (PHEV), the trims offered are Preferred, Premium, and Premium Plus. For the 2025 model year, the Premium Sport trim replaced Premium.

In Canada, the available inline-six trims are GS, GS-L, GT, GT-P, and Signature.

=== Latin America ===
==== Chile ====
The CX-90 was launched in Chile on 16 October 2023, in the sole Signature inline-six variant. In May 2024, the Premium variant was introduced, which compared to the U.S. version of the trim, lacks Nappa leather and has minor styling differences.

==== Mexico ====
The CX-90 was released in Mexico on 11 April 2023, in the sole Signature inline-six variant. The CX-70 went on sale in Mexico on 22 May 2024, in the sole Grand Touring inline-six variant.

=== Middle East ===
The CX-90 alongside the CX-60 debuted in the Middle Eastern markets on 22 February 2024.

=== Oceania ===
==== Australia ====
The CX-90 went on sale in Australia on 14 August 2023, with three trim levels: Touring, GT, and Azami. The Azami trim is available with SP and Takumi option packages. Two powertrains are available for each trim level: 3.3-liter e-Skyactiv-G mild hybrid gasoline (G50e) and 3.3-liter e-Skyactiv-D mild hybrid diesel (D50e); all wheel drive comes as standard for all variants.

The CX-70 went on sale in Australia on 23 October 2024, with two trim levels: GT and Azami, it is available with the same powertrains options from the CX-90.

==== New Zealand ====
The CX-90 was launched alongside the CX-60 in New Zealand in September 2023, in a sole Takami trim powered only by a 3.3-liter e-Skyactiv-G mild hybrid gasoline engine.

== Powertrain ==
Available with mild hybrid and plug-in hybrid options, the CX-90 and CX-70 were Mazda's first production models to feature hybrid powertrains in North America.

The mild-hybrid range consists of two 3.3-liter turbocharged inline-six engines, both using the M Hybrid Boost system. The H3T "e-Skyactiv G" with a high-pressure turbocharger on S trims produces 340 horsepower (254 kW) and 369 pound-feet (500 N⋅m) with premium unleaded fuel, or 319 hp (238 kW) on regular. Non-S trims use a standard-pressure turbocharger, rated at 280 hp (209 kW) and 332 lb⋅ft (450 N⋅m). An Australian-market diesel, the T3-VPTH "e-Skyactiv D", is rated at 251 hp (187 kW) and 406 lbf⋅ft (550 N⋅m). All engines are paired with the MR integrated starter-generator and a 0.33 kWh battery, which contributes an additional 16.6 hp (12 kW) and 113 lb⋅ft (153 N⋅m).

The plug-in hybrid e-Skyactiv PHEV combines a 2.5-liter four-cylinder PY-VPH with an electric motor and 17.8 kWh battery, for a total output of 323 hp (241 kW) and 369 lbf⋅ft (500 N⋅m) on premium, or 319 hp (238 kW) on regular.

All versions use Mazda's "i-Activ AWD" rear-biased all-wheel drive system and the eight-speed 8EC-AT "Skyactiv-Drive" automatic transmission, which replaces a conventional torque converter with a single wet clutch to increase front passenger footwell space.

Model	Type	Engine code	Displacement	Power	Torque	Electric motor	Battery	Top speed	0 to 100 km/h	Cal. years
e-Skyactiv G (standard turbo)	Gasoline mild hybrid	H3T	3,283 cc (3.3 L) turbo I6	Engine: 280 hp (209 kW) @ 5,000–6,000 rpm Motor: 16.6 hp (12.4 kW) @ 900 rpm	Engine: 332 lb⋅ft (450 N⋅m) @ 2,000–3,500 rpm Motor: 113 lb⋅ft (153 N⋅m) @ 200 rpm	M Hybrid Boost ISG	0.33 kWh, 44.4 V	210 km/h (130 mph)	6.5 s	2023 – present
e-Skyactiv G (high pressure turbo)	Gasoline mild hybrid	H3T	3,283 cc (3.3 L) turbo I6	Engine: 340 hp (254 kW) @ 5,500–6,000 rpm (Note: With premium fuel, reduced to 319 hp (238 kW) with regular fuel.) Motor: 16.6 hp (12.4 kW) @ 900 rpm	Engine: 369 lb⋅ft (500 N⋅m) @ 2,000–4,500 rpm Motor: 113 lb⋅ft (153 N⋅m) @ 200 rpm	M Hybrid Boost ISG	0.33 kWh, 44.4 V	204 km/h (127 mph)	5.8 s (Note: With premium fuel, increases to 6.5 s with regular fuel.)	2023 – present
e-Skyactiv D	Diesel mild hybrid	T3‑VPTH	3,283 cc (3.3 L) turbo I6	Engine: 251 hp (187 kW) @ 3,750 rpm Motor: 16.6 hp (12.4 kW) @ 900 rpm	Engine: 406 lbf⋅ft (550 N⋅m) @ 1,500–2,400 rpm Motor: 113 lb⋅ft (153 N⋅m) @ 200 rpm	M Hybrid Boost ISG	0.33 kWh, 44.4 V	?	8.4 s	2023 – present
e-Skyactiv PHEV	Gasoline plug-in hybrid	PY‑VPH	2,488.5 cc (2.5 L) I4	Combined: 323 hp (241 kW) (Note: With premium fuel, reduced to 319 hp (238 kW) with regular fuel.) Engine: 189 hp (141 kW) @ 6,000 rpm (Note: With premium fuel, reduced to 185 hp (138 kW) with regular fuel.) Motor: 173 hp (129 kW) @ 5,500 rpm	Combined: 369 lb⋅ft (500 N⋅m) @ 4,000 rpm Engine: 192 lb⋅ft (260 N⋅m) @ 4,000 rpm (Note: With premium fuel, reduced to 184 lb⋅ft (249 N⋅m) with regular fuel.) Motor: 199 lb⋅ft (270 N⋅m) @ 400 rpm	Permanent-magnet synchronous	17.8 kWh, 355 V	190 km/h (118 mph) (Note: Governor limited)	6.2 s	2023 – present

== Safety ==
The 2024 CX-90 and 2025 CX-70 both received the Top Safety Pick+ award from the Insurance Institute for Highway Safety. Both models earned Good ratings in all categories except for the headlights on non-turbo versions, which were rated Acceptable because adaptive headlights are only available on turbo models.

IIHS scores
Small overlap front	Good
Moderate overlap front	Good
Side	Good
Headlights (S trims)	Good
Headlights (PHEV and non-S trims)	Acceptable
Front crash prevention: pedestrian	Good
Seat belt reminders	Good
Child seat anchors (LATCH) ease of use	Good+

== Awards ==
In 2024, the CX-90 and CX-90 hybrid were among 12 midsize SUVs listed on Car and Driver's Editors' Choice.

== Sales ==
Year	Mazda CX-90			Mazda CX-70	
Year	U.S.	Canada	Mexico	U.S.	Canada
2023	30,821	4,692	971		
2024	54,676	7,823	2,152	10,678	3,134
2025	55,156	8,494		13,833	5,291
