= Best current practice =

Level of performance in engineering and information technology

A best current practice (BCP) is a de facto level of performance in engineering and information technology. It is more flexible than a standard, since techniques and tools are continually evolving. The Internet Engineering Task Force publishes Best Current Practice documents in a numbered document series. Each document in this series is paired with the currently valid Request for Comments (RFC) document. BCP was introduced in RFC-1818.

BCPs are document guidelines, processes, methods, and other matters not suitable for standardization. The Internet standards process itself is defined in a series of BCPs, as is the formal organizational structure of the IETF, Internet Engineering Steering Group, Internet Architecture Board, and other groups involved in that process. IETF's separate Standard Track (STD) document series defines the fully standardized network protocols of the Internet, such as the Internet Protocol, the Transmission Control Protocol, and the Domain Name System.

Each RFC number refers to a specific version of a document Standard Track, but the BCP number refers to the most recent revision of the document. Thus, citations often reference both the BCP number and the RFC number. Example citations for BCPs are: BCP 38, RFC 2827.

== Significant fields of application ==
=== BCP related to IPv6 ===
BCP number	Title
BCP157	IPv6 Address Assignment to End Sites
BCP177	IPv6 Support Required for All IP-Capable Nodes
BCP198	IPv6 Prefix Length Recommendation for Forwarding

=== BCP related to DNS ===
BCP number	Title
BCP016	Selection and Operation of Secondary DNS Servers
BCP017	Use of DNS Aliases for Network Services
BCP020	Classless IN-ADDR.ARPA delegation
BCP032	Reserved Top Level DNS Names
BCP042	Domain Name System (DNS) IANA Considerations
BCP049	Delegation of IP6.ARPA
BCP052	Management Guidelines & Operational Requirements for the Address and Routing Parameter Area Domain ("arpa")
BCP065	Dynamic Delegation Discovery System (DDDS) Part Five: URI.ARPA Assignment Procedures
BCP080	Delegation of E.F.F.3.IP6.ARPA
BCP091	DNS IPv6 Transport Operational Guidelines
BCP109	Deprecation of "ip6.int"
BCP123	Observed DNS Resolution Misbehavior
BCP152	DNS Proxy Implementation Guidelines
BCP155	Nameservers for IPv4 and IPv6 Reverse Zones
BCP163	Locally Served DNS Zones

=== BCP related to security ===
BCP number	Title
BCP021	Expectations for Computer Security Incident Response
BCP038	Network Ingress Filtering: Defeating Denial of Service Attacks which employ IP Source Address Spoofing
BCP046	Recommended Internet Service Provider Security Services and Procedures
BCP061	Strong Security Requirements for Internet Engineering Task Force Standard Protocols
BCP072	Guidelines for Writing RFC Text on Security Considerations
BCP106	Randomness Requirements for Security
BCP136	Secure Connectivity and Mobility Using Mobile IPv4 and IKEv2 Mobility and Multihoming (MOBIKE)
BCP140	Preventing Use of Recursive Nameservers in Reflector Attacks
BCP188	Pervasive Monitoring Is an Attack
BCP194	BGP Operations and Security
BCP195	Recommendations for Secure Use of Transport Layer Security (TLS) and Datagram Transport Layer Security (DTLS)
BCP199	DHCPv6-Shield: Protecting against Rogue DHCPv6 Servers

=== BCP related to globalization ===
BCP number	Title
BCP047	Tags for Identifying Languages (IETF language tag)

== See also ==
- Benchmarking
- Best practice
- Gold standard (test)
- Prior art
