= Mazda CX-9 =

Mid-size crossover SUV

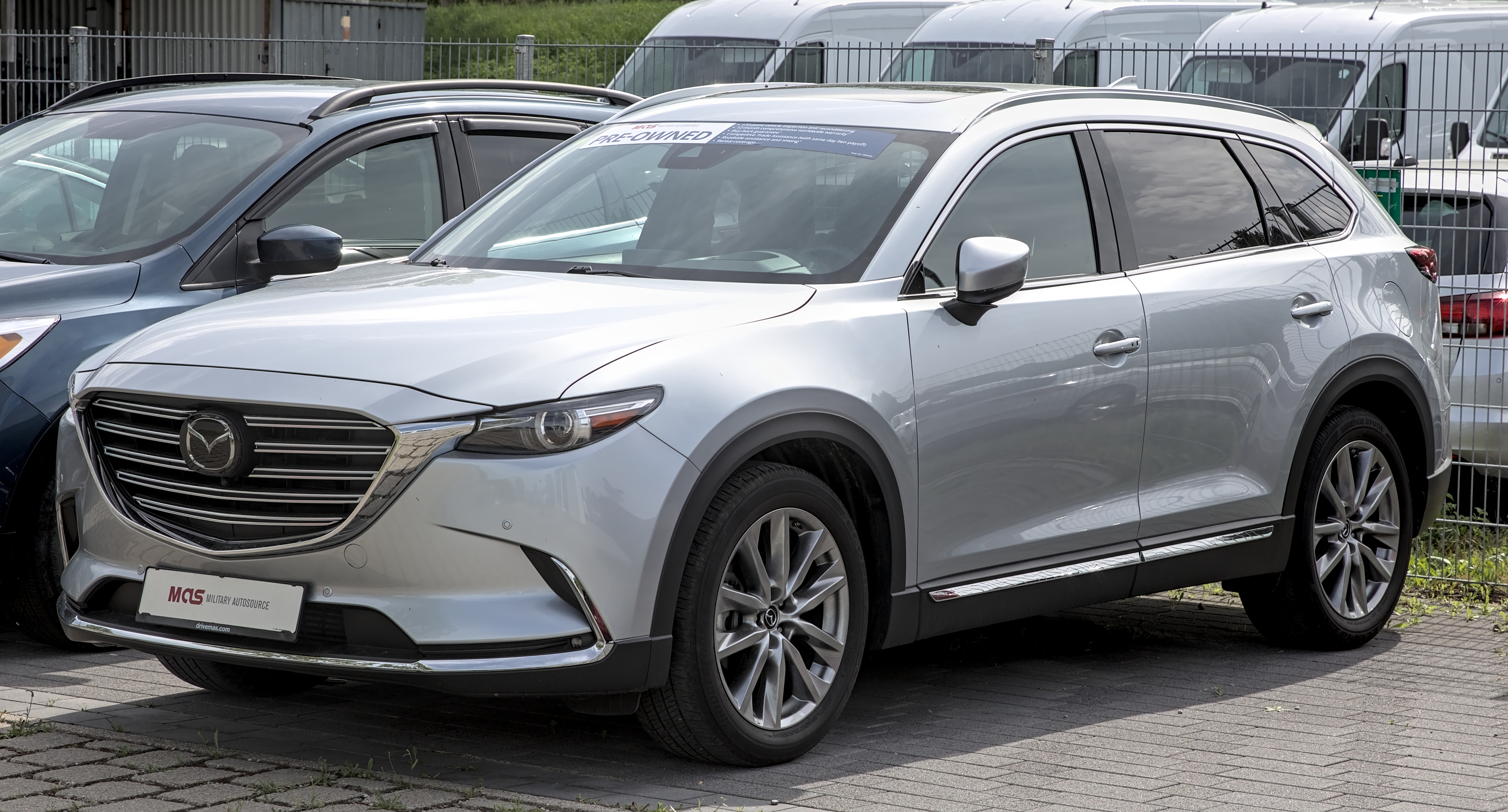

Overview
- Manufacturer: Mazda
- Production: April 2006 – June 30 2023
- Model years: 2007–2023

Body and chassis
- Class: Mid-size crossover SUV
- Body style: 5-door SUV
- Layout: Front-engine, front-wheel-drive; Front-engine, four-wheel-drive

Chronology
- Successor: Mazda CX-90

The Mazda CX-9 is a mid-size crossover SUV manufactured by Mazda from 2006 to 2023 through two generations with three-row seating. It was Mazda's largest passenger vehicle until the arrival of the Mazda CX-90.

Despite being built in Japan at Mazda's Ujina #1 plant in Hiroshima Prefecture, the CX-9 was never offered in the Japanese domestic market. The shorter and narrower Mazda CX-8 was offered in Japan instead. Production was ended in 2023, with the Mazda CX-90 serving as its successor.

== First generation (TB; 2006) ==
First generation
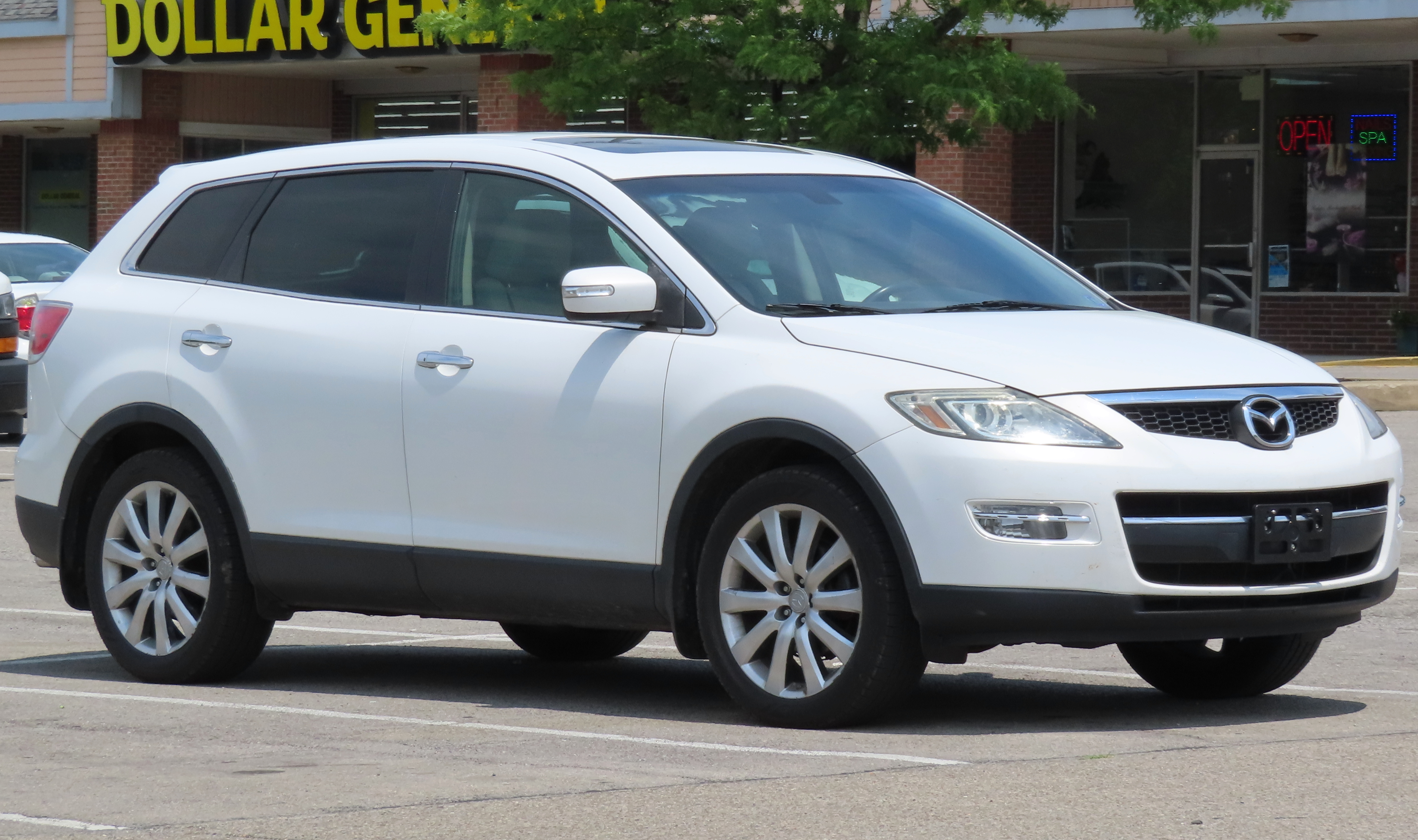
- Pre-facelift

Overview
- Model code: TB
- Production: 2006–2015
- Model years: 2007–2015
- Assembly: Japan: Hiroshima (Ujima Plant No. 1)
- Designer: Moray Callum; Kaname Sawai (2004)

Body and chassis
- Platform: Ford CD3 platform
- Related: Mazda6

Powertrain
- Engine: Gasoline: 3.5 L MZI V6 (2006–2007); 3.7 L MZI V6 (2007–2015)
- Transmission: 6-speed F21 automatic

Dimensions
- Wheelbase: 2,875 mm (113.2 in)
- Length: 5,075 mm (199.8 in)
- Width: 1,935 mm (76.2 in)
- Height: 2006–09: 1,730 mm (68 in); 2006–09 Grand Touring: 1,735 mm (68.3 in); 2010–15: 1,727 mm (68.0 in)
- Curb weight: 2,054 kg (4,528 lb) (approx.)

The first generation CX-9 was originally fitted with a 3.5 L Ford V6 engine, but, in 2008, the engine was changed to a 3.7 L unit producing 204 kW (274 hp) and 366 N⋅m (270 lb⋅ft) of torque. The updated engine was introduced in June 2007 and it was now built by Mazda themselves. This engine was coupled with a six speed automatic transmission. The first generation is based on the Ford CD3 platform that is shared with many Ford and Mazda models; the Ford Edge is its close mechanical sibling. It was launched at the 2006 New York International Auto Show.

Standard safety equipment included blind spot monitoring, backup camera, electronic stability control, traction control, roll stability control, front side impact airbags, and three row side curtain airbags.

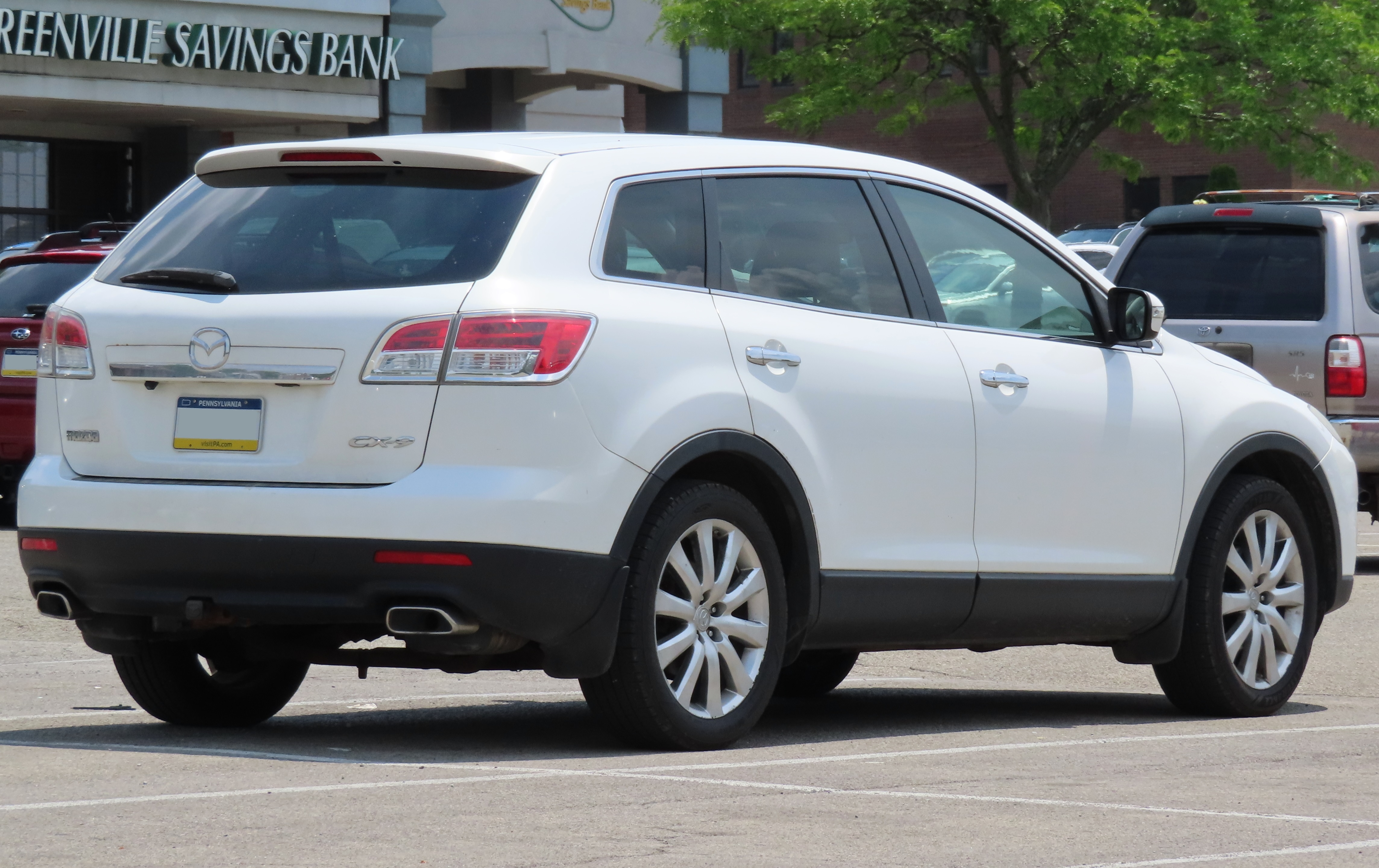
Rear view (pre-facelift)

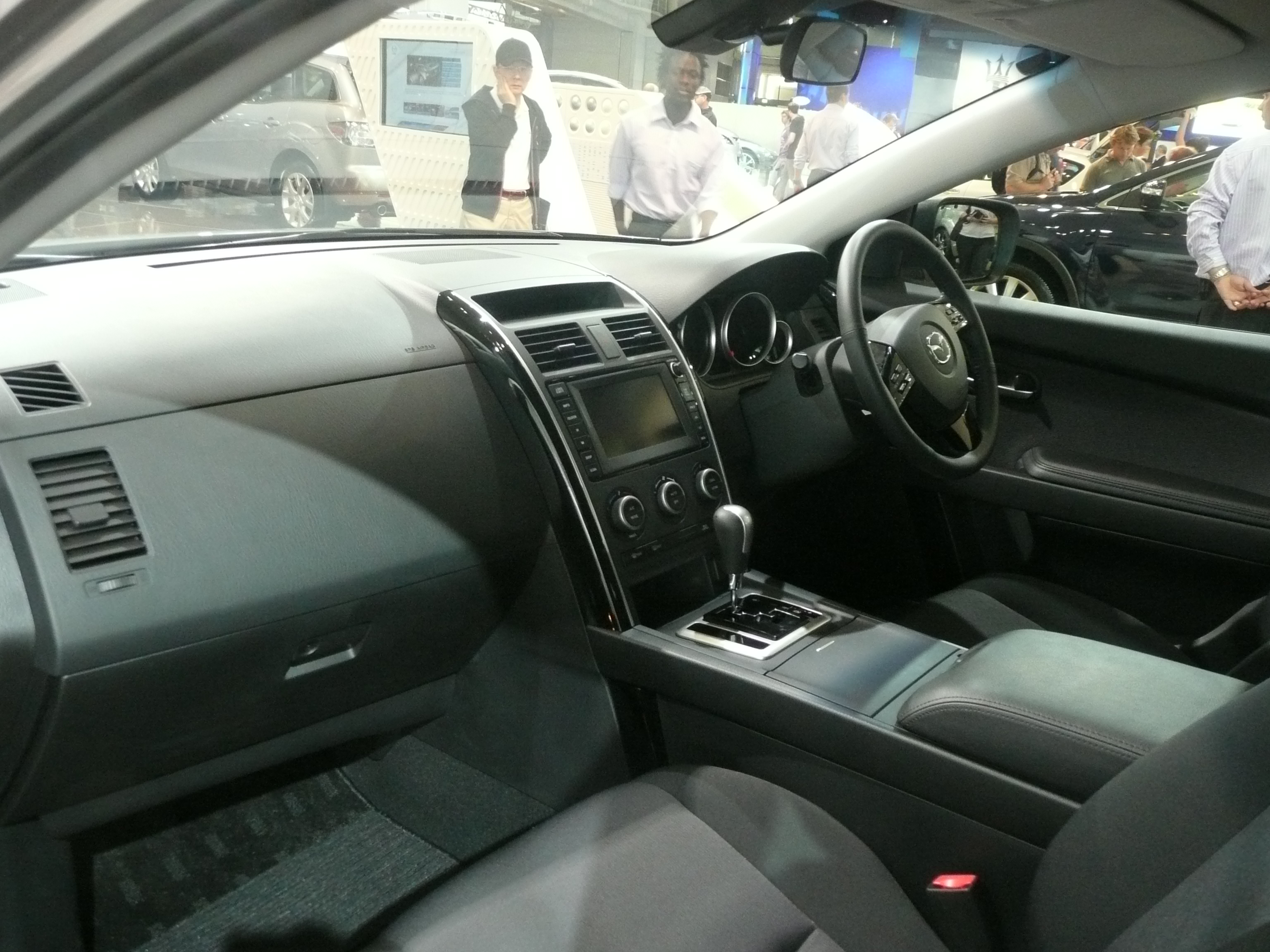
Interior

=== Facelift (2010) ===
For the model year of 2010, the Mazda CX-9 received a minor facelift and consisting of a new front fascia and new tail lights. Three zone climate control and a Bluetooth hands free interface were now standard features.

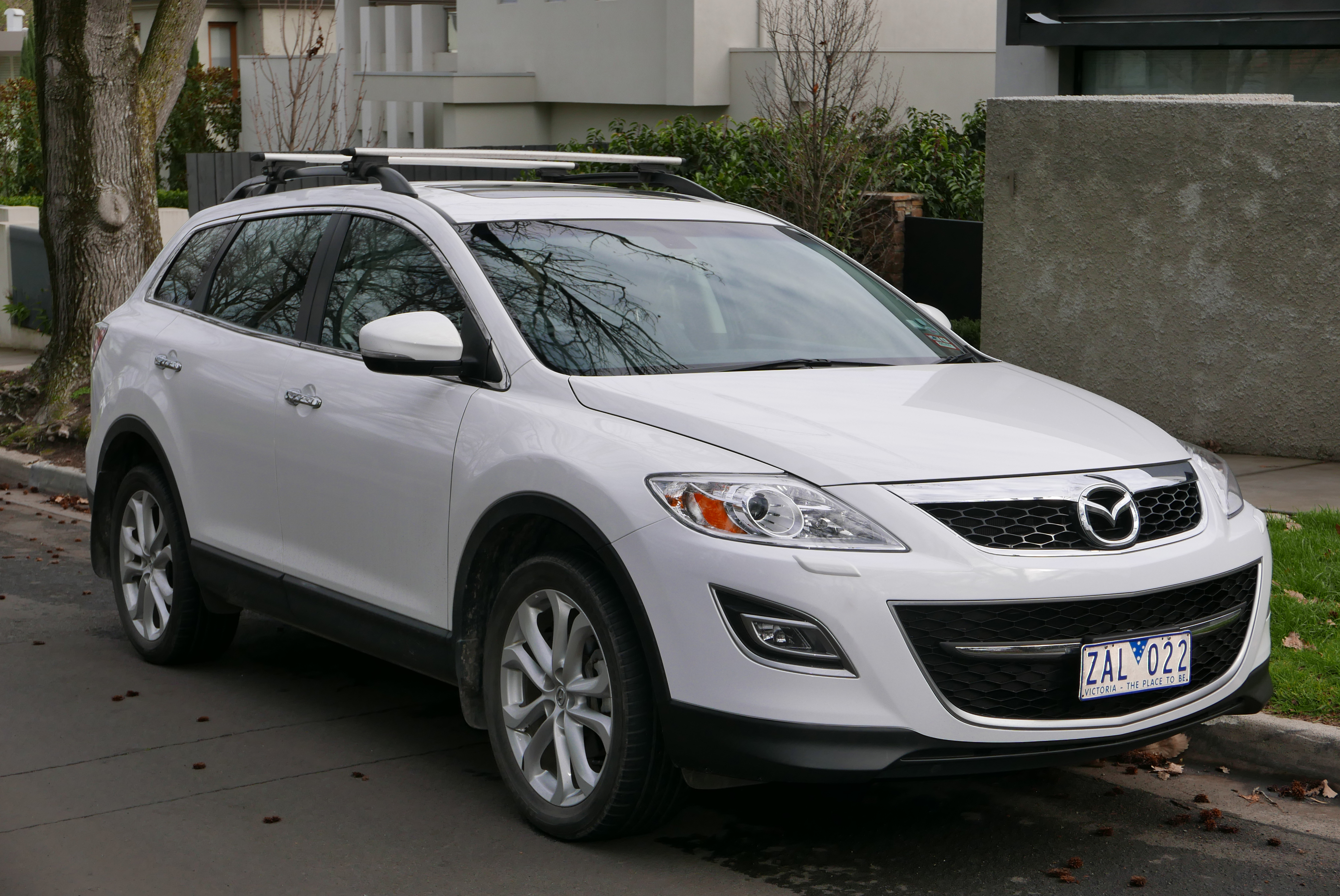
Facelift (2010)

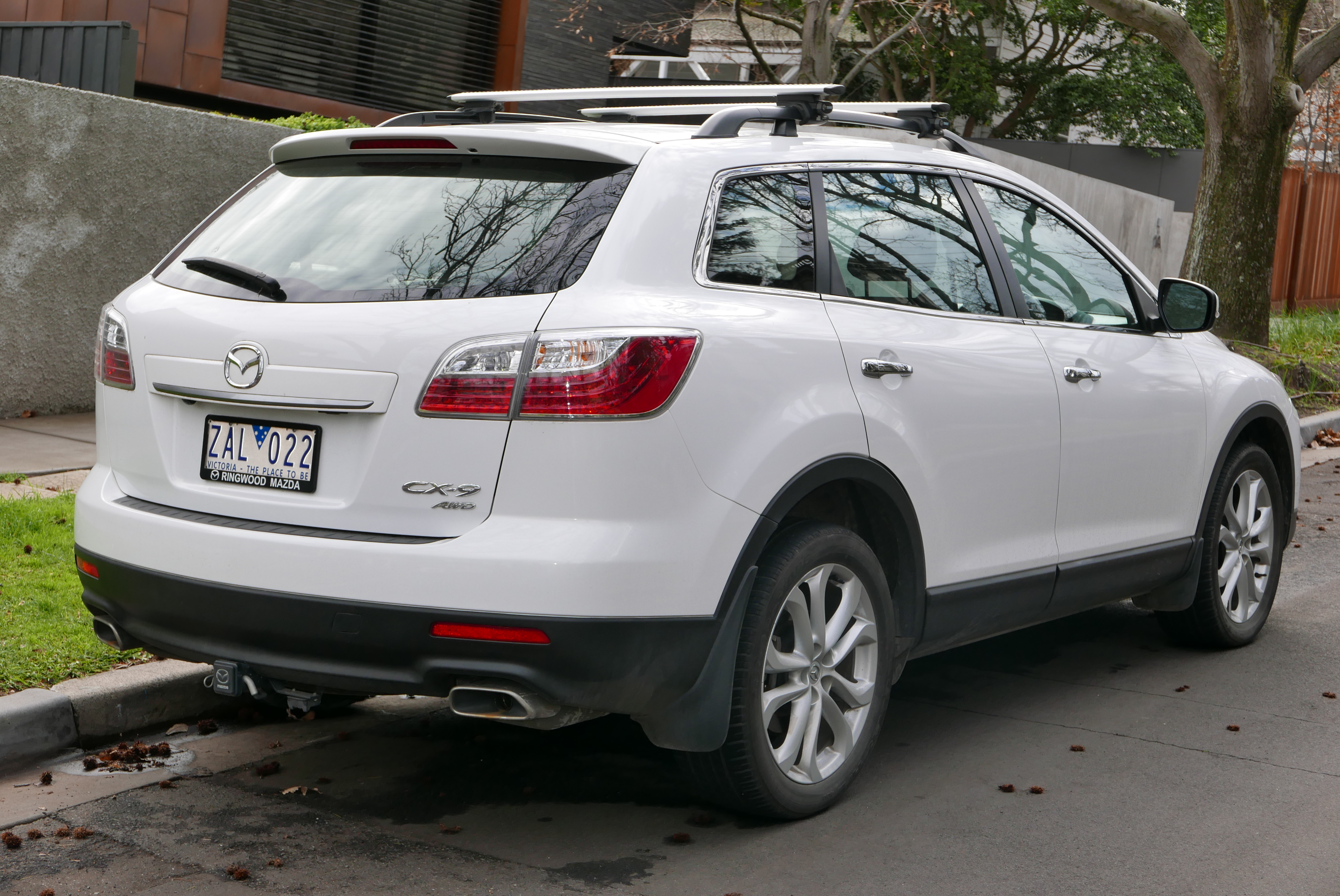
Facelift (2010)

=== Facelift (2013) ===
For the model year of 2013, the CX-9 received a refresh that included a new grille, new bumper, new headlights, new tail lights, and restyled front vents to align it with Mazda's "Kodo Design" philosophy.

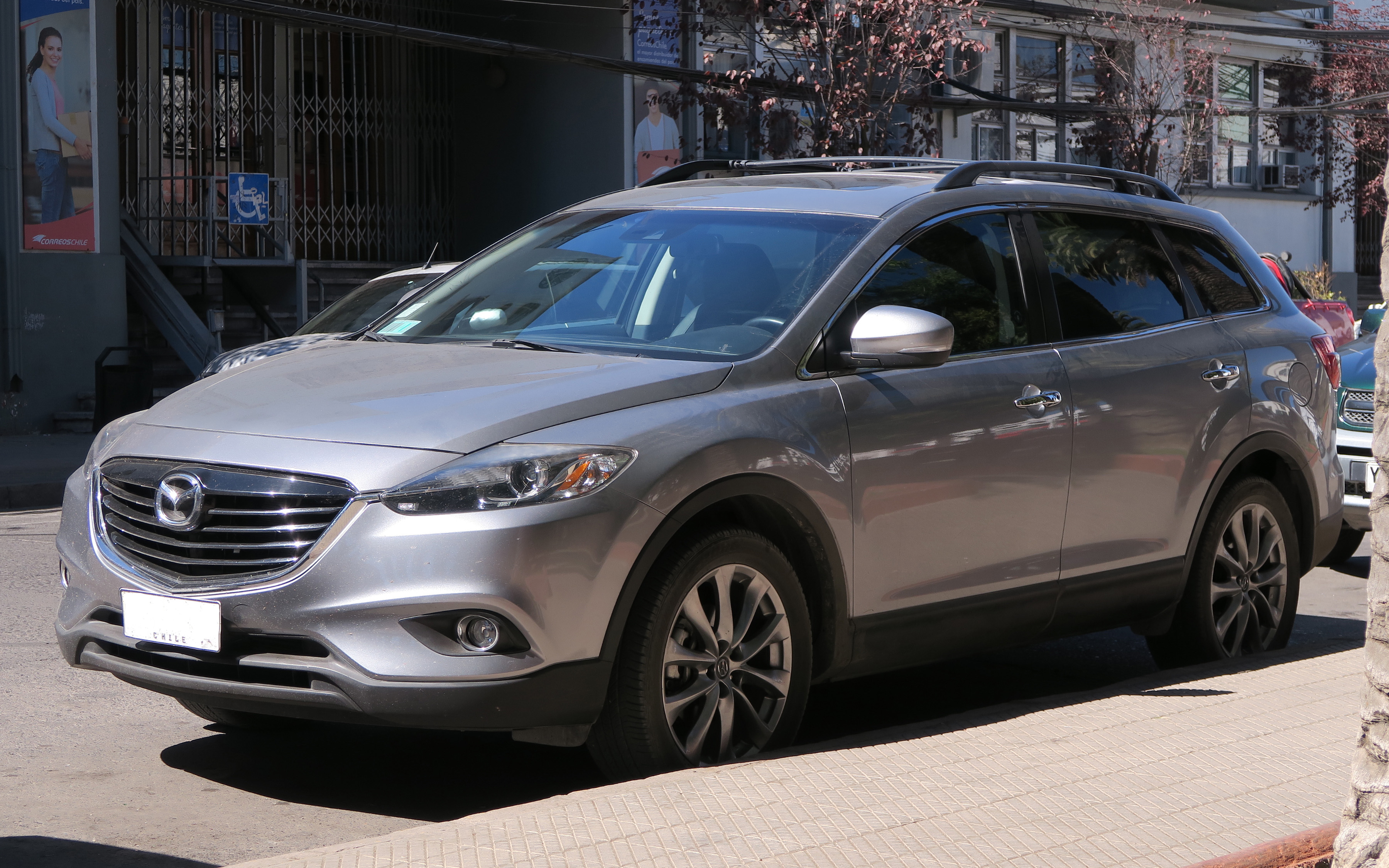
Facelift (2013)

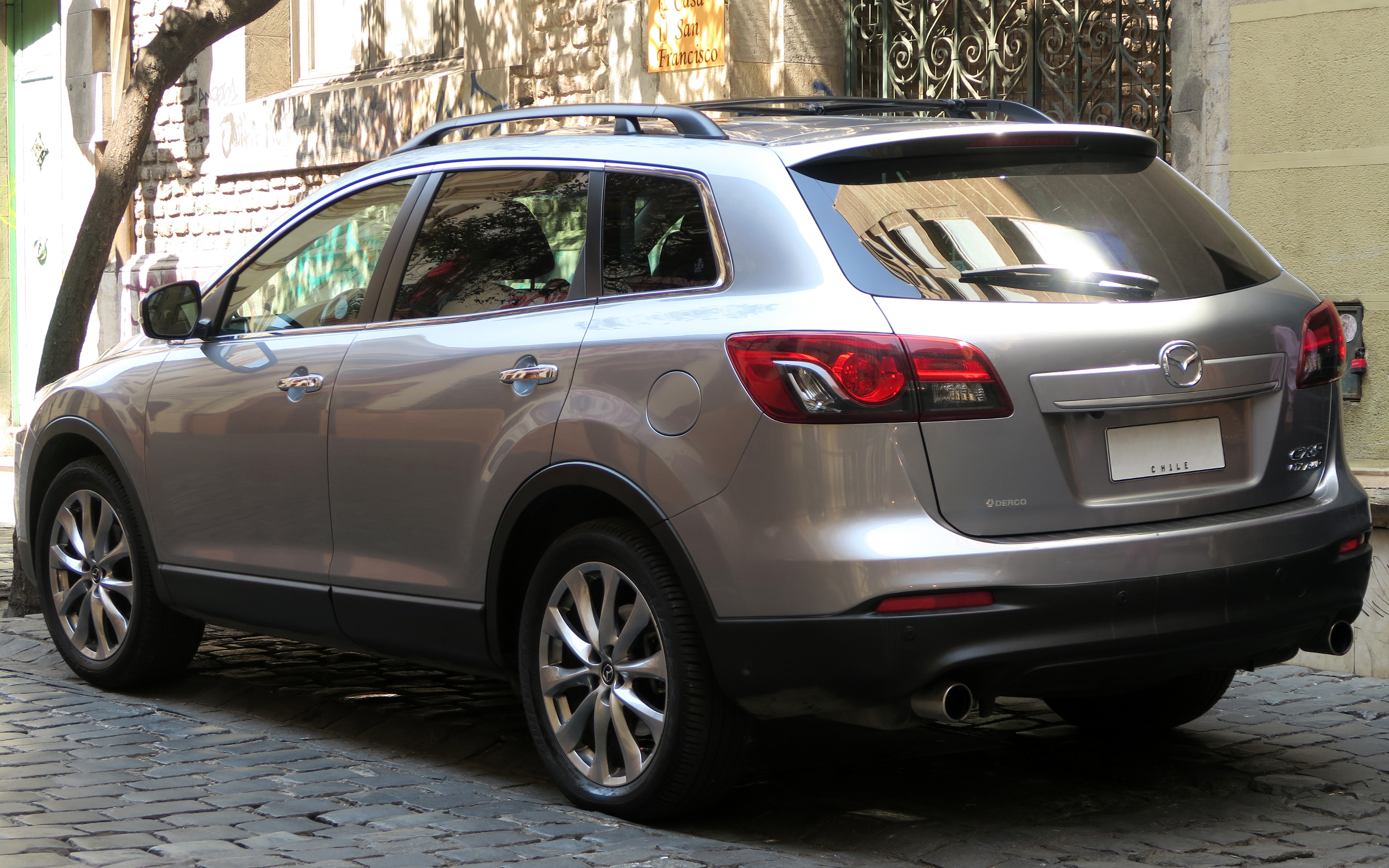
Facelift (2013)

== Second generation (TC; 2016) ==
Second generation
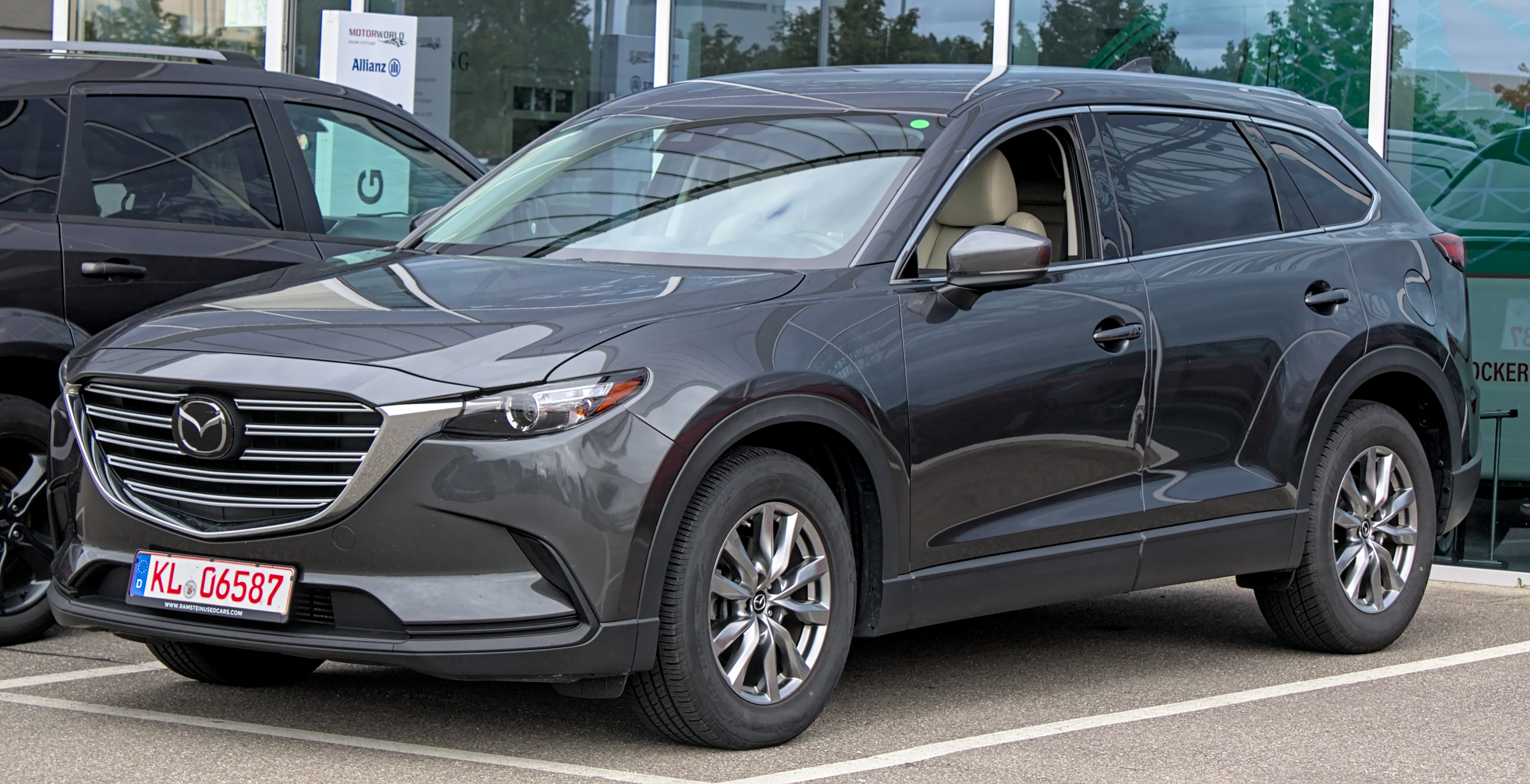

Overview
- Model code: TC
- Production: February 2016 – June 30, 2023
- Model years: 2016–2023
- Assembly: Japan: Hiroshima (Ujima Plant No. 1); Russia: Vladivostok (Sollers JSC)
- Designer: Derek Jenkins

Body and chassis
- Related: Mazda Atenza/Mazda6; Mazda CX-8

Powertrain
- Engine: Gasoline: 2.5 L Skyactiv-G PY-VPTS turbo I4
- Power output: 169 kW (227 hp; 230 PS)
- Transmission: 6-speed Skyactiv-Drive automatic

Dimensions
- Wheelbase: 2,930 mm (115.4 in)
- Length: 5,075 mm (199.8 in)
- Width: 1,969 mm (77.5 in)
- Height: 1,747 mm (68.8 in)
- Curb weight: 1,924 kg (4,242 lb)

At the 2015 Los Angeles Auto Show, Mazda revealed the second generation CX-9, nine years after the previous version launched. The 2016 Mazda CX-9 was brand new, based on the Skyactiv platform and engines that are shared with other new Mazdas introduced after 2011. Production started in February 2016.

The second generation Mazda CX-9 uses a turbocharged version of the 2.5-liter four-cylinder Skyactiv (Grades vary) gasoline engine, producing 227 hp (230 PS; 169 kW) on 87 AKI octane fuel (91 RON) and 250 hp (253 PS; 186 kW) on premium fuel and 420 N⋅m (43 kg⋅m; 310 lb⋅ft) of torque. The engine is joined with a six speed automatic transmission. The U.S. EPA rates the all-wheel drive 2016 Mazda CX-9 at 21 mpg_{‑US} (25 mpg_{‑imp}; 11 L/100 km) city and 26 mpg_{‑US} (31 mpg_{‑imp}; 9.0 L/100 km) highway.

The new exterior design follows Mazda's Kodo design philosophy. It is shorter than before, but rides on a longer wheelbase, resulting in shorter front and rear overhangs. Weight is also down 90 kg (198 lb) in the FWD versions and by 130 kg (287 lb) in AWD versions.

Mazda added many new active safety systems on the new CX-9. These include the Blind Spot Monitoring, Radar Cruise Control with a Stop/Start function, Lane Keep Assist, Lane Departure Warning, High Beam Control, and Autonomous Emergency Braking (low & high speed).

The CX-9 was discontinued in the U.S. market after 2023, being replaced by the CX-90 as Mazda's three-row flagship SUV. However, it continued to be produced and is sold in other markets such as the Middle East. Production was ended in 2024, with the Mazda CX-90 serving as its successor.

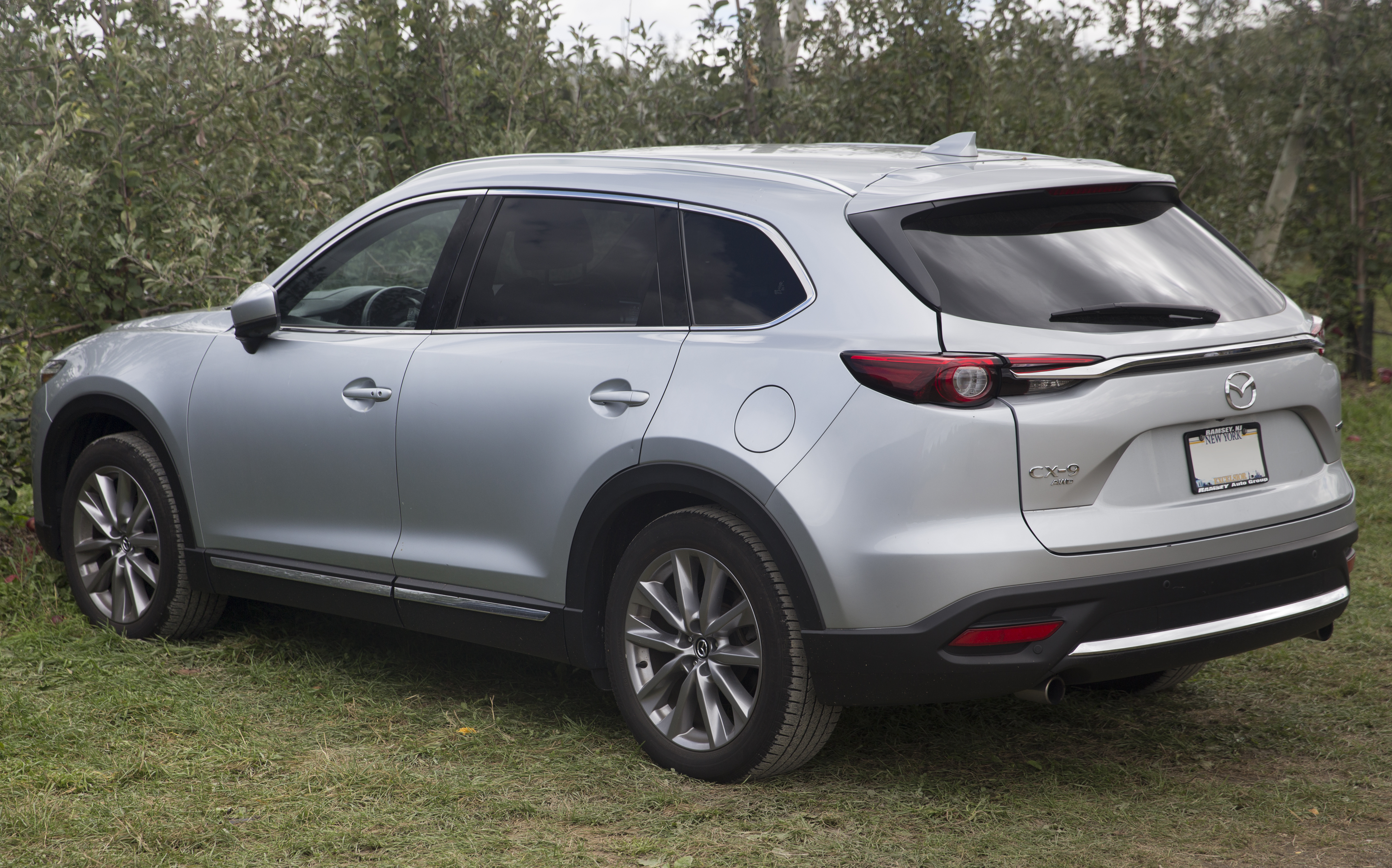
Rear view

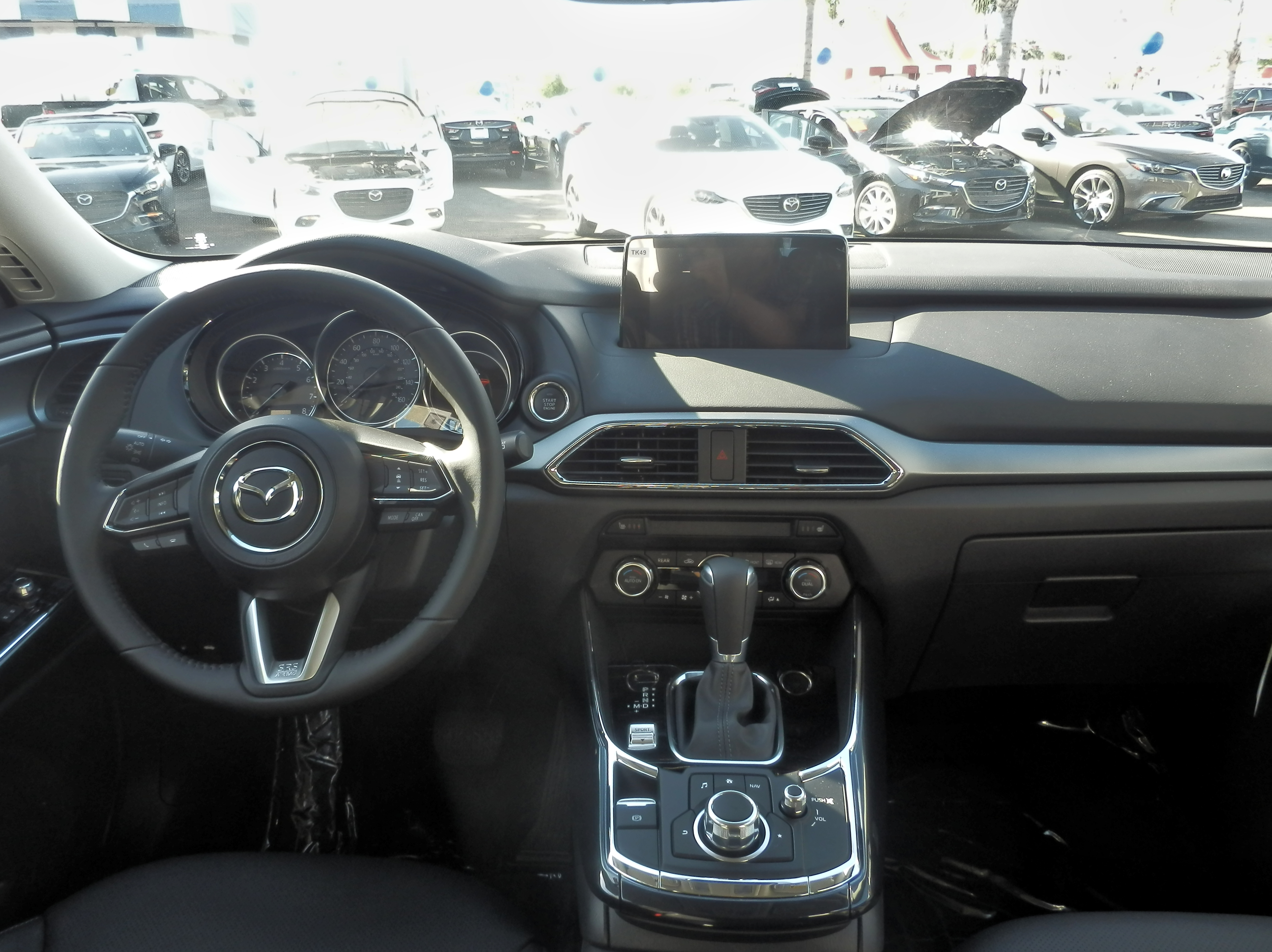
Interior

=== Safety ===
ANCAP test results* Mazda CX-9 (2016)
Test	Score
Overall	5 /5 stars
Frontal offset	14.87/16
Side impact	16/16
Pole	2/2
Seat belt reminders	3/3
Whiplash protection	Good
Pedestrian protection	Good
Electronic stability control	Standard

== Awards ==
In 2008, the first generation Mazda CX-9 was awarded the Motor Trend SUV of the Year. Also, it was selected for the North American Truck of the Year Award in 2008.

In Australia, the second generation Mazda CX-9 was awarded the 2017 Wheels Car of the Year.

Car and Driver named the CX-9 the best midsize SUV in its annual 10 Best Trucks and SUVs for 2017 and 2018.

The CX-9 was also a finalist for the 2017 World Car Design of the Year Award.

In 2017, the second generation Mazda CX-9 was awarded the first ever IIHS Top Safety Pick+ Award.

== Sales ==
Year	U.S.	Canada	Mexico	Australia	Malaysia (Note: Figures based on registration (Malaysia))
2007	25,566	2,117			1
2008	26,100	1,725			96
2009	21,132	1,028			125
2010	28,908	1,282			149
2011	34,421	1,283			105
2012	24,442	1,412			95
2013	24,628	1,436	1,929		87
2014	18,496	1,543	1,691		85
2015	18,048	1,139	1,392		29
2016	16,051	2,444	2,154		24
2017	25,828	3,943	2,123	9,012	81
2018	28,257	4,372	1,826	8,094	196
2019	26,861	4,422	1,525	7,168	161
2020	27,638	3,911	1,120	6,747	142
2021	34,493	4,530	1,267	6,630	39
2022	34,580	4,113	674	6,460	44
2023	17,451	2,060	703	4,696	23
