= Client Puzzle Protocol =

Computer algorithm used in Internet communication

Possible generation method of client puzzles.

Client Puzzle Protocol (CPP) is a computer algorithm for use in Internet communication, whose goal is to make abuse of server resources infeasible. It is an implementation of a proof-of-work system (PoW).

The idea of the CPP is to require all clients connecting to a server to correctly solve a mathematical puzzle before establishing a connection, if the server is under attack. After solving the puzzle, the client would return the solution to the server, which the server would quickly verify, or reject and drop the connection. The puzzle is made simple and easily solvable but requires at least a minimal amount of computation on the client side. Legitimate users would experience just a negligible computational cost, but abuse would be deterred: those clients that try to simultaneously establish a large number of connections would be unable to do so because of the computational cost (time delay). This method holds promise in fighting some types of spam as well as other attacks like denial-of-service.

== See also ==
- Computer security
- Intrusion-prevention system
- Proof-of-work system
- Hashcash
- Guided tour puzzle protocol
