= Ingress cancellation =

Method for removing narrowband noise

Ingress cancellation is a method for removing narrowband noise from an electromagnetic signal using a digital filter. This type of filter is used on hybrid fiber-coaxial broadband networks.

If a carrier appears in the middle of the upstream data signal, ingress cancellation can remove the interfering carrier without causing packet loss.

Ingress cancellation also removes one or more carriers that are higher in amplitude than the data signal. Ingress cancellation eventually will break if the in-channel ingress gets too high.

== See also ==
- Distortion
- Electromagnetic interference
- Ingress filtering
- Noise reduction
