= Ingres paper =

Type of drawing paper

Ingres paper is a type of drawing paper. It is a laid finish paper of light to medium weight, and it is not as strong or as durable as Bristol paper. Laid finish refers to the imprint of regular screen pattern of a papermaker's mould. Ingres is not necessarily a handmade paper, but is produced to replicate the properties of laid paper. Ingres is often used for charcoal and pastel drawing. It is also used as an endpaper in books.

The development of Ingres paper for drawing is ascribed to the French Neoclassical artist Dominique Ingres (1780-1867), although modern Ingres papers can differ from those actually used by Ingres. Ingres paper's pattern is a laid mesh. The laid effect creates a toothy grain of close lines on one side and a mottled surface on the reverse. The toothiness allows the paper to take charcoal easily and evenly. Ingres paper is favored in book arts for its antique appearance and pH neutrality.

Prominent manufactures include Canson, Hahnemühle (sometimes called "German Ingres"), and Fabriano. Ingres paper has a high rag content (around 65%) and is gelatin sized. It is available in a variety of colors.
