= Ingress, egress, and regress =

Legal terms in property law

Ingress, egress, and regress are legal terms referring respectively to entering, leaving, and returning to property or lands. The term also refers to the rights of a person (such as a lessee) to do so as regards a specific property.

The term was used in the Ingress into India Ordinance, 1914 when the British government wanted to screen, detain, and restrict the movement of people returning to India, particularly those involved in the Ghadar Movement.

== See also ==
- Ingress
