= Ingress filtering =

Computer network packet filtering technique

In computer networking, ingress filtering is a technique used to ensure that incoming packets are actually from the networks from which they claim to originate. This can be used as a countermeasure against various spoofing attacks where the attacker's packets contain fake IP addresses. Spoofing is often used in denial-of-service attacks, and mitigating these is a primary application of ingress filtering.

== Problem ==
Networks receive packets from other networks. Normally a packet will contain the IP address of the computer that originally sent it. This allows devices in the receiving network to know where it came from, allowing a reply to be routed back (amongst other things), except when IP addresses are used through a proxy or a spoofed IP address, which does not pinpoint a specific user within that pool of users.

A sender IP address can be faked (spoofed), characterizing a spoofing attack. This disguises the origin of packets sent, for example in a denial-of-service attack. The same holds true for proxies, although in a different manner than IP spoofing.

== Potential solutions ==
One potential solution involves implementing the use of intermediate Internet gateways (i.e., those servers connecting disparate networks along the path followed by any given packet) filtering or denying any packet deemed to be illegitimate. The gateway processing the packet might simply ignore the packet completely, or where possible, it might send a packet back to the sender relaying a message that the illegitimate packet has been denied. Host intrusion prevention systems (HIPS) are one example of technical engineering applications that help to identify, prevent and/or deter unwanted, unsuspected or suspicious events and intrusions.

Any router that implements ingress filtering checks the source IP field of IP packets it receives and drops packets if the packets don't have an IP address in the IP address block to which the interface is connected. This may not be possible if the end host is multi-homed and also sends transit network traffic.

In ingress filtering, packets coming into the network are filtered if the network sending it should not send packets from the originating IP address(es). If the end host is a stub network or host, the router needs to filter all IP packets that have, as the source IP, private addresses (RFC 1918), bogon addresses or addresses that do not have the same network address as the interface.

== Networks ==
Network ingress filtering is a packet filtering technique used by many Internet service providers to try to prevent IP address spoofing of Internet traffic, and thus indirectly combat various types of net abuse by making Internet traffic traceable to its source.

Network ingress filtering makes it much easier to track denial-of-service attacks to their source(s) so they can be fixed.

Network ingress filtering is a good neighbor policy that relies on cooperation between ISPs for their mutual benefit.

The best current practices for network ingress filtering are documented by the Internet Engineering Task Force in BCP 38 and 84, which are defined by RFC 2827 and RFC 3704, respectively.

BCP 84 recommends that upstream providers of IP connectivity filter packets entering their networks from downstream customers, and discard any packets which have a source address that is not allocated to that customer.

There are many possible ways of implementing this policy; one common mechanism is to enable reverse-path forwarding on links to customers, which will indirectly apply this policy based on the provider's route filtering of their customers' route announcements.

== Deployment ==
As of 2012, one report suggests that, contrary to general opinion about the lack of BCP 38 deployment, some 80% of the Internet (by various measures) were already applying anti-spoofing packet filtering in their networks.

David A. Wheeler is in favor of passing a law requiring 100% of all ISPs to implement network ingress filtering as defined in IETF BCP 38. In the US, presumably the FCC would enforce this law.

== See also ==
- Egress filtering
- Ingress cancellation
- Prefix hijacking
