= Miyoshi Plant =

Miyoshi Plant

- Miyoshi (Mazda factory) (三次工場), in Miyoshi, Hiroshima, Japan
- Miyoshi (Toyota factory) (三好工場), in Miyoshi, Aichi, Pajan
