= Mazda CX-5 =

Compact crossover SUV

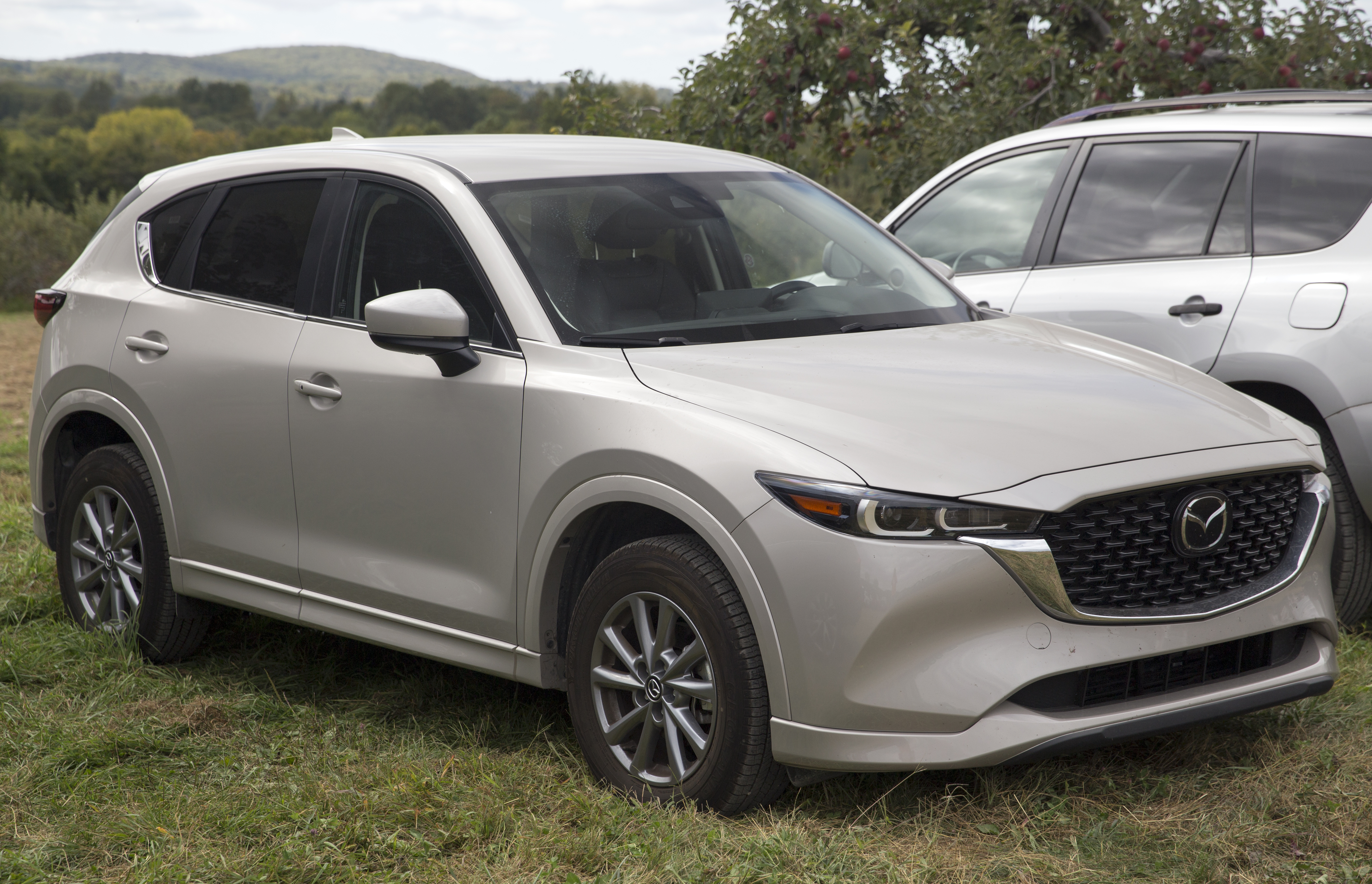
- Second generation CX-5 (KF; 2024)

Overview
- Manufacturer: Mazda
- Production: 2012–present
- Model years: 2013–present

Body and chassis
- Class: Compact crossover SUV
- Body style: 5-door SUV
- Layout: Front-engine, front-wheel-drive; Front-engine, four-wheel-drive

Chronology
- Predecessor: Mazda Tribute; Mazda CX-7

The Mazda CX-5 is a compact crossover SUV produced by Mazda since 2012, a successor to both the Tribute and the slightly larger CX-7. It is Mazda's first model to feature the "Kodo" design language and the first model to be fully developed with a range of technologies branded as Skyactiv, including a rigid, lightweight platform combined with a series of engines and transmissions to reduce emissions and fuel consumption. It debuted in 2011.

Since 2019, the CX-5 has been positioned above the smaller CX-30. As of 2022, depending on the region, the CX-5 is positioned right below the larger CX-50, CX-60 or CX-8 within Mazda's crossover SUV line-up.

Since 2014, the CX-5 has consistently been Mazda’s best-selling model globally. It achieved record sales in 2019, with 444,262 units sold worldwide. As of March 2022, cumulative sales of the CX-5 reached around 3.5 million units.

== First generation (KE; 2012) ==
First generation
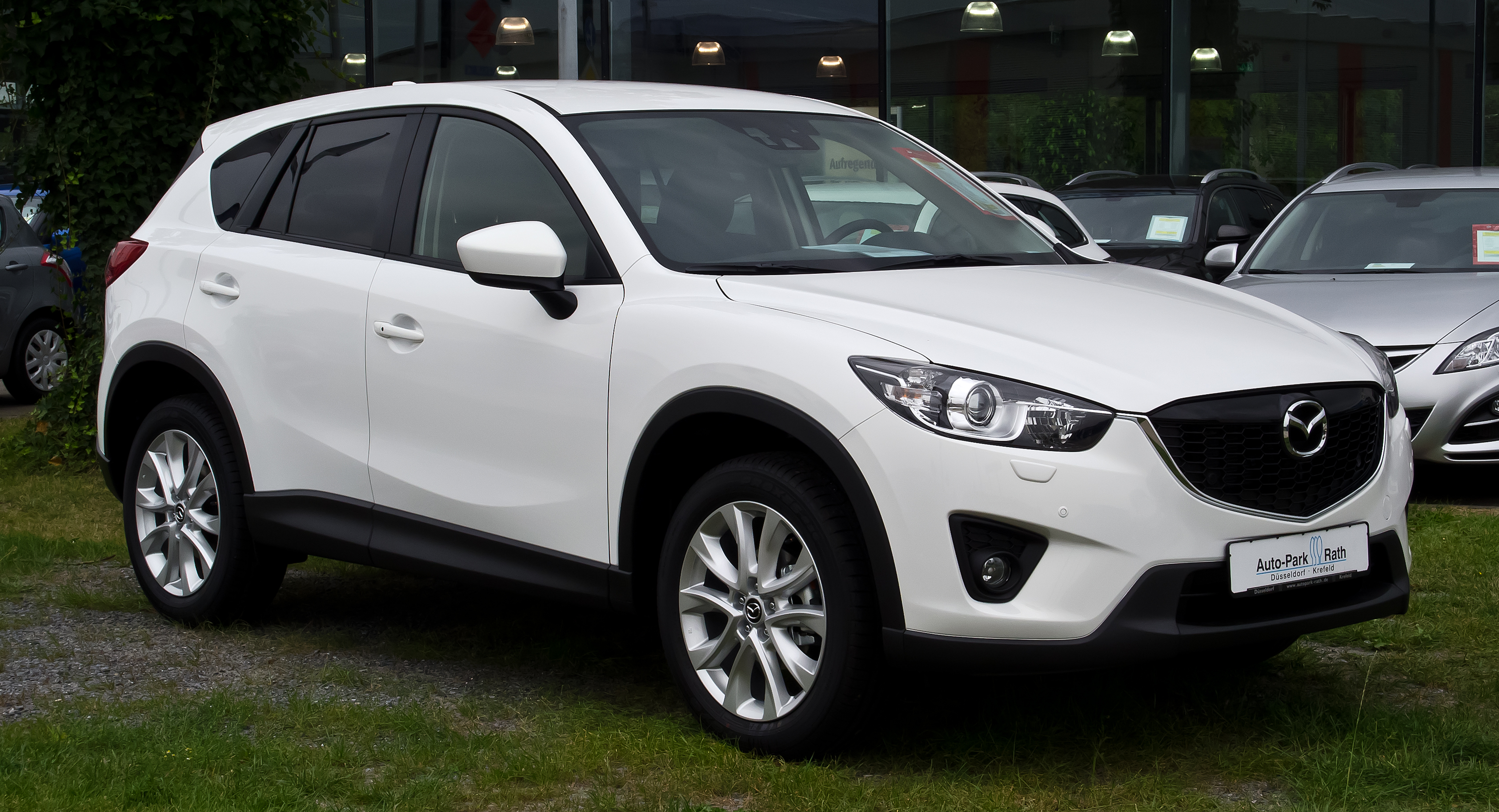

Overview
- Model code: KE
- Production: January 2012 – 2017
- Model years: 2013–2016
- Assembly: Japan: Hiroshima (Ujina Plant No. 1, Ujina Plant No. 2); China: Nanjing (Changan Mazda); Malaysia: Kulim (Inokom); Russia: Vladivostok (Mazda Sollers); Vietnam: Quảng Nam (THACO Auto)
- Designer: Norihito Iwao (exterior: 2009); Masashi Nakayama (2009, 2010)

Powertrain
- Engine: Petrol: 2.0 L Skyactiv-G PE-VPS I4; 2.5 L Skyactiv-G PY-VPS I4; Diesel: 2.2 L Skyactiv-D SH-VPTS I4
- Transmission: 6-speed Skyactiv-MT manual; 6-speed Skyactiv-Drive automatic

Dimensions
- Wheelbase: 2,700 mm (106.3 in)
- Length: 4,540 mm (178.7 in)
- Width: 1,840 mm (72.4 in)
- Height: 1,670 mm (65.7 in)
- Curb weight: 1,455–1,555 kg (3,208–3,428 lb)

The Mazda MINAGI (Japanese: マツダ 勢) concept car, unveiled at the 2011 Geneva Motor Show, was the first Mazda vehicle to combine the company's Kodo design language and Skyactiv technologies. Its design served as a preview of the CX-5.

In rapid development from 2009 to 2011 under Hideaki Tanaka, and styled under Masashi Nakayama from 2009 to 2010, the CX-5 was first shown at the September 2011 Frankfurt Motor Show. The Japanese model was unveiled at the 2011 Tokyo Motor Show, while a customized variant featuring a red exterior body colour, alloy wheels painted in matte black, and a slightly lower body height was unveiled in 2012 at the Tokyo Auto Salon.

It shares the platform used by the third-generation Mazda3 and the third-generation Mazda6.

The production model went on sale in February 2012, with initial choice of a 2.0 Skyactiv-G petrol engine or a 2.2 Skyactiv-D diesel engine matched to a Skyactiv-Drive six-speed automatic transmission or a six-speed manual transmission.

Japanese production of the CX-5 began in January 2012 at the Ujina plant near Mazda's headquarters in Hiroshima. In July 2012, production of the model at Ujina was set to increase to 240,000 units per year by expanding production from Ujina Plant No.2 to Ujina Plant No.1.

During its introduction in February 2012, the CX-5 won the 2012-2013 Car of the Year Japan award.

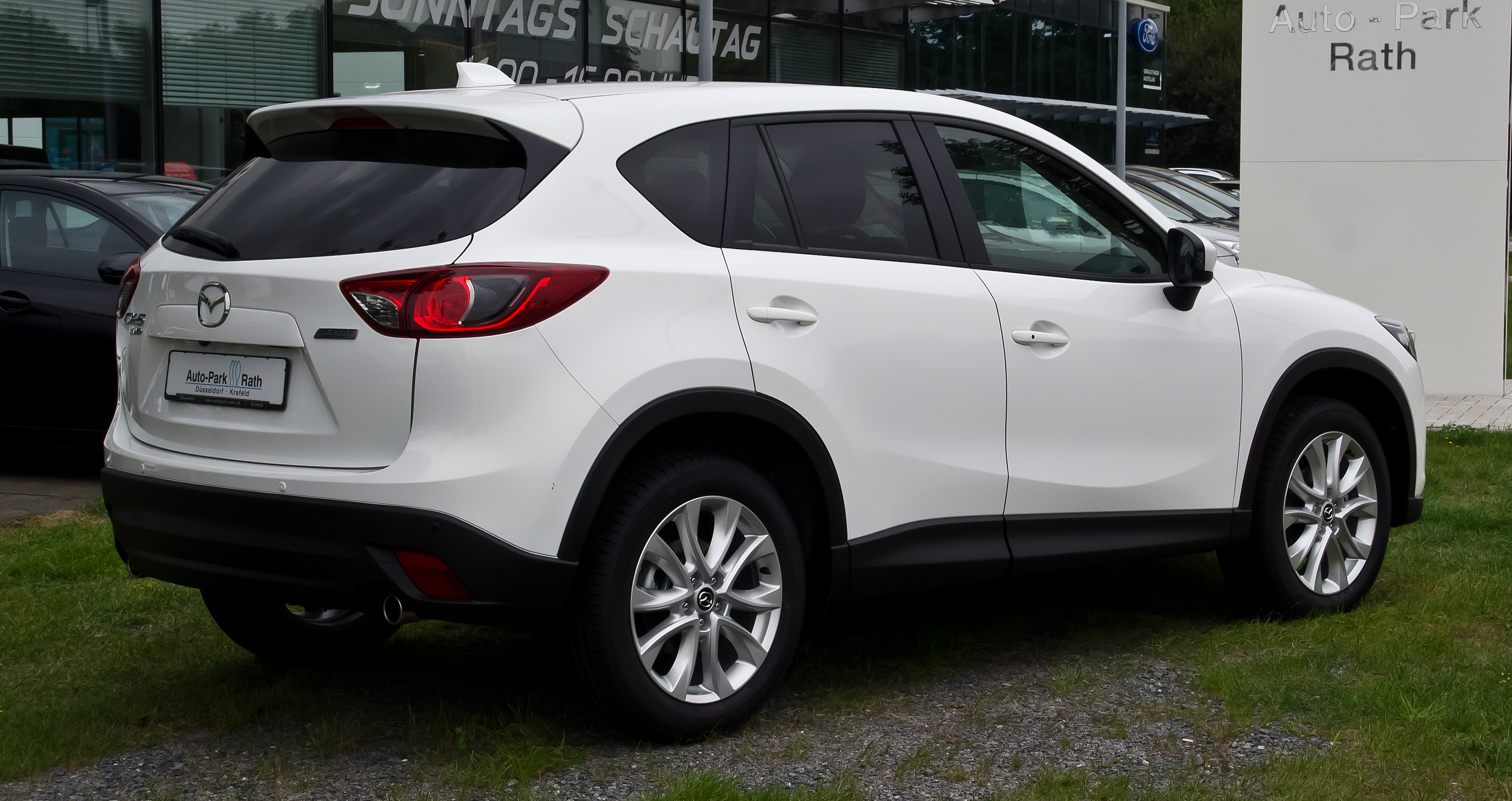
Rear view

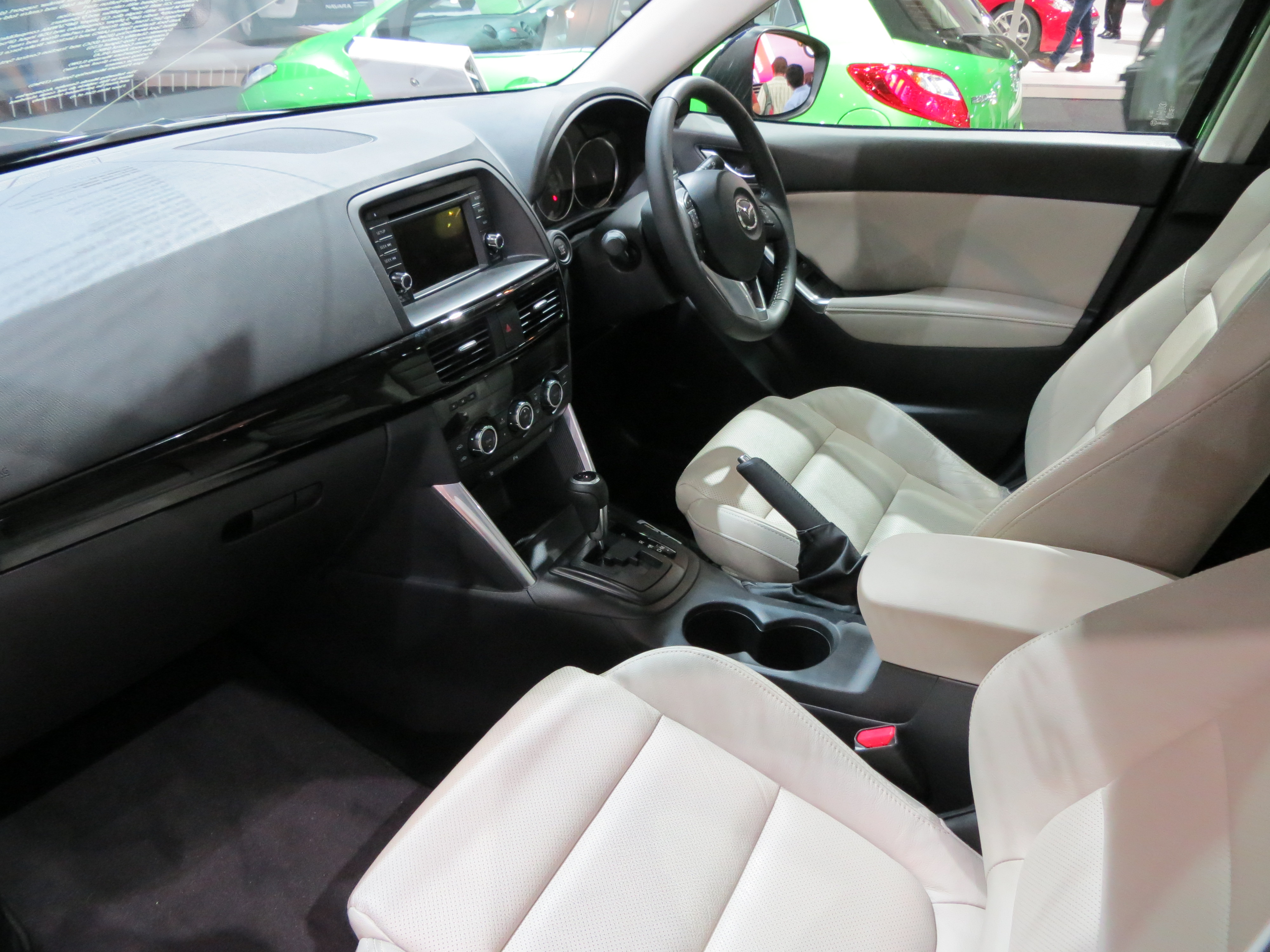
Interior

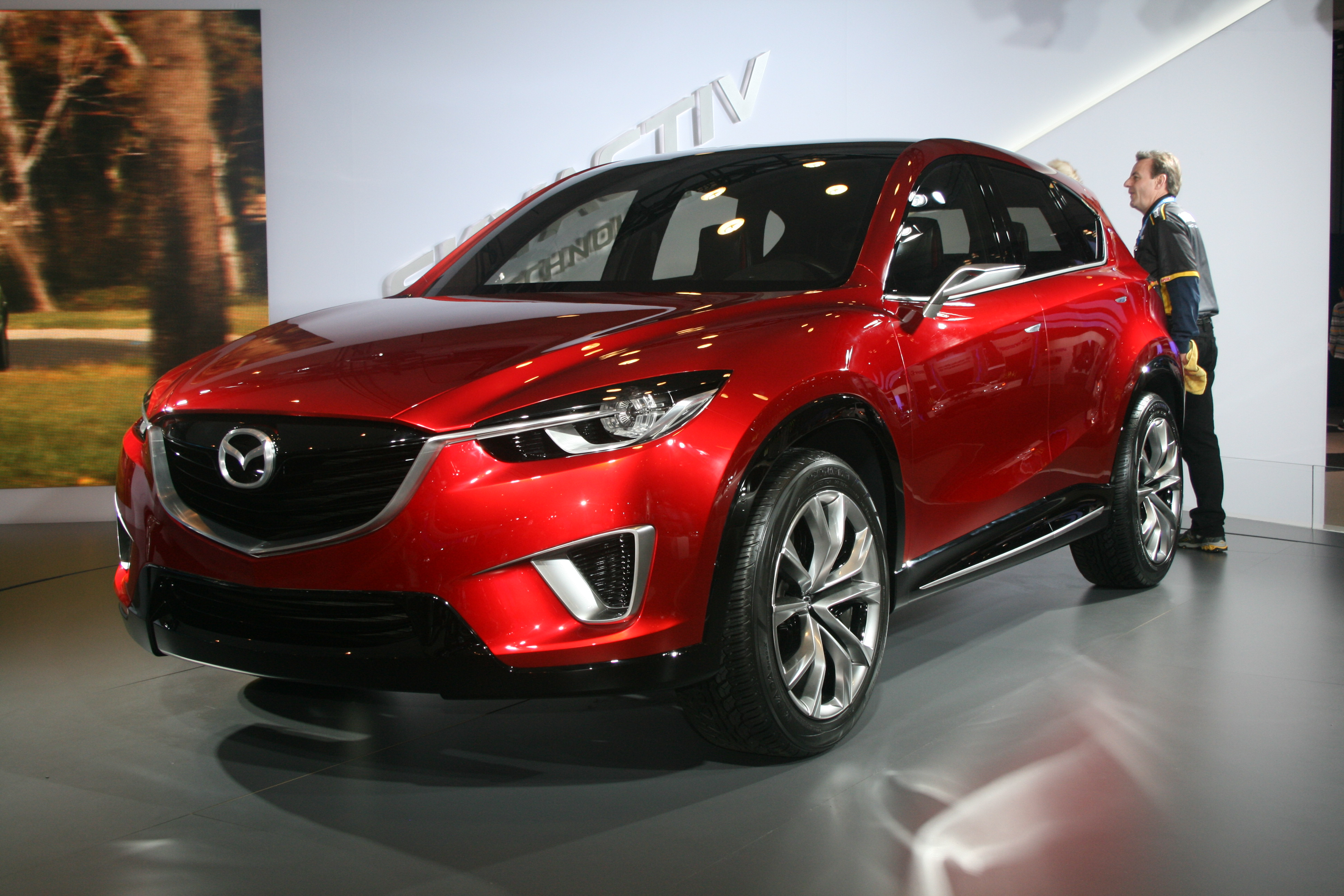
Mazda MINAGI

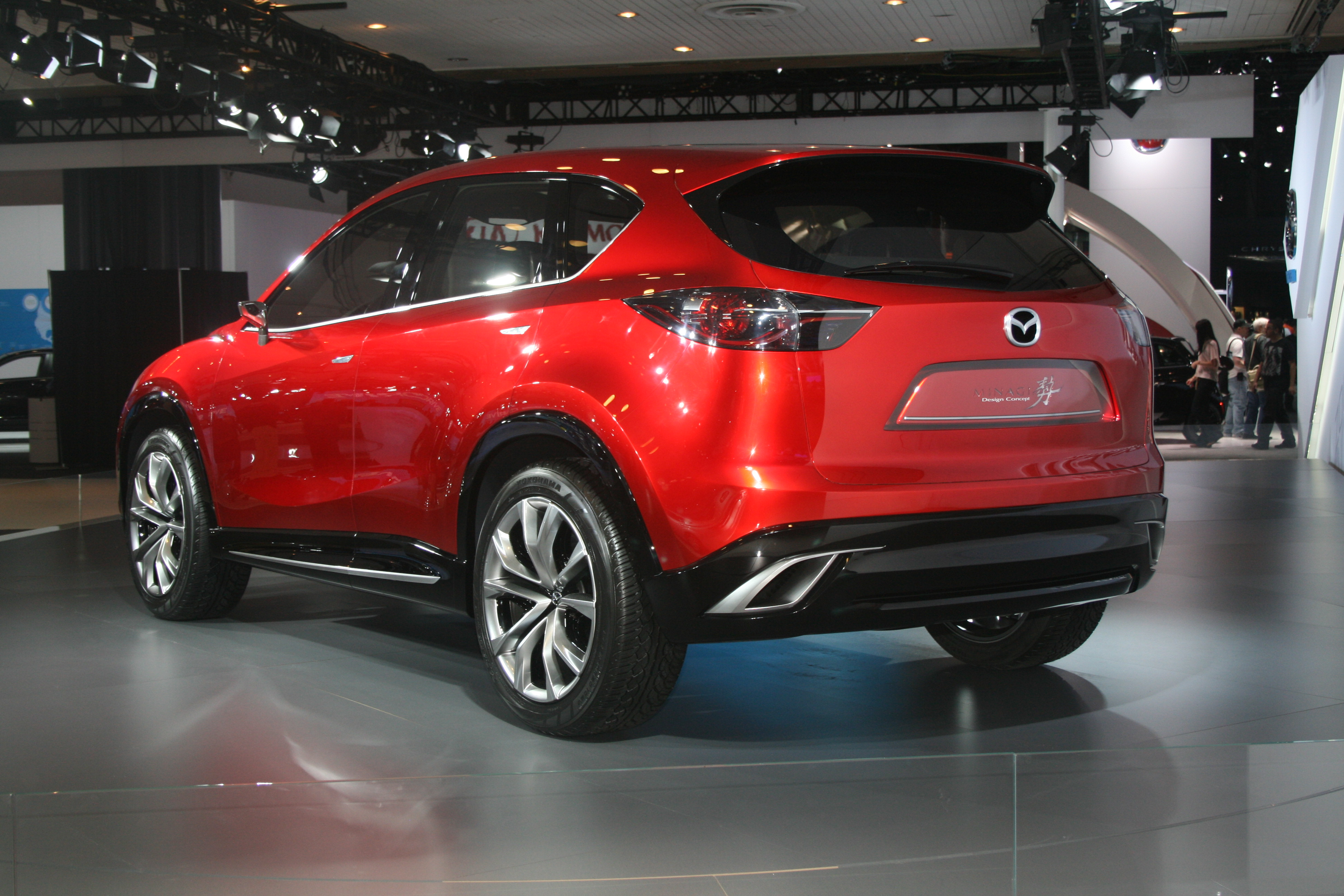
Rear view (MINAGI)

=== Facelift ===
The facelifted Mazda CX-5 was unveiled at the 2014 Los Angeles Auto Show as a 2016 model. Notable changes include updates to exterior styling, reductions in road noise, improvements made to the infotainment system, and a sport mode for the six-speed automatic transmission. LED headlights, LED fog lights and combination LED tail lights were also offered as for higher trim levels.

In the U.S. and Canada, the update was designated as a 2016.5 model year iteration. The Skyactiv-G 2.5 engine was made standard on all United States trim levels, except the base-level Sport equipped with the six-speed manual transmission and front wheel drive, which retained the 2.0-litre powerplant.

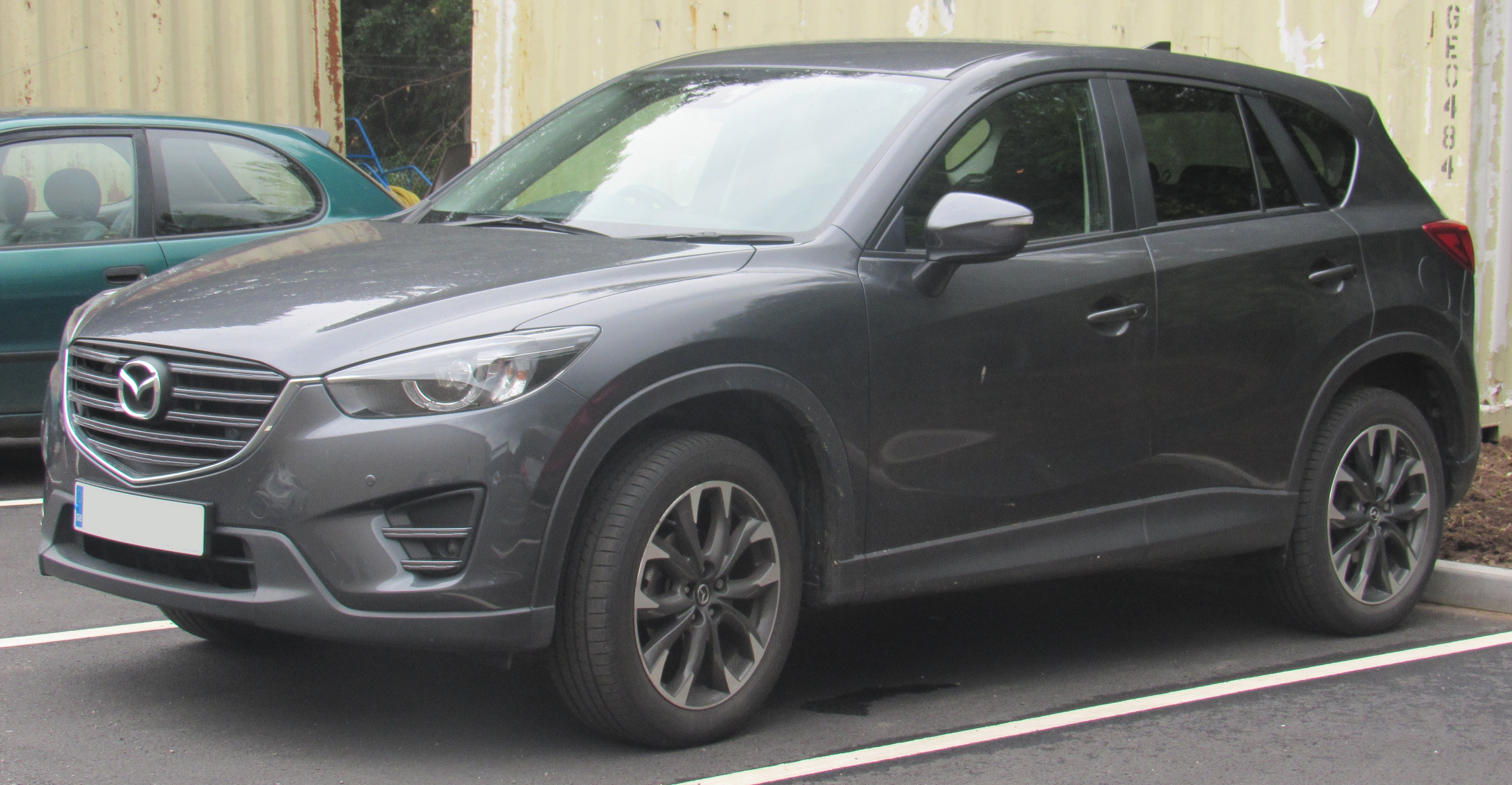
Mazda CX-5 (facelift)

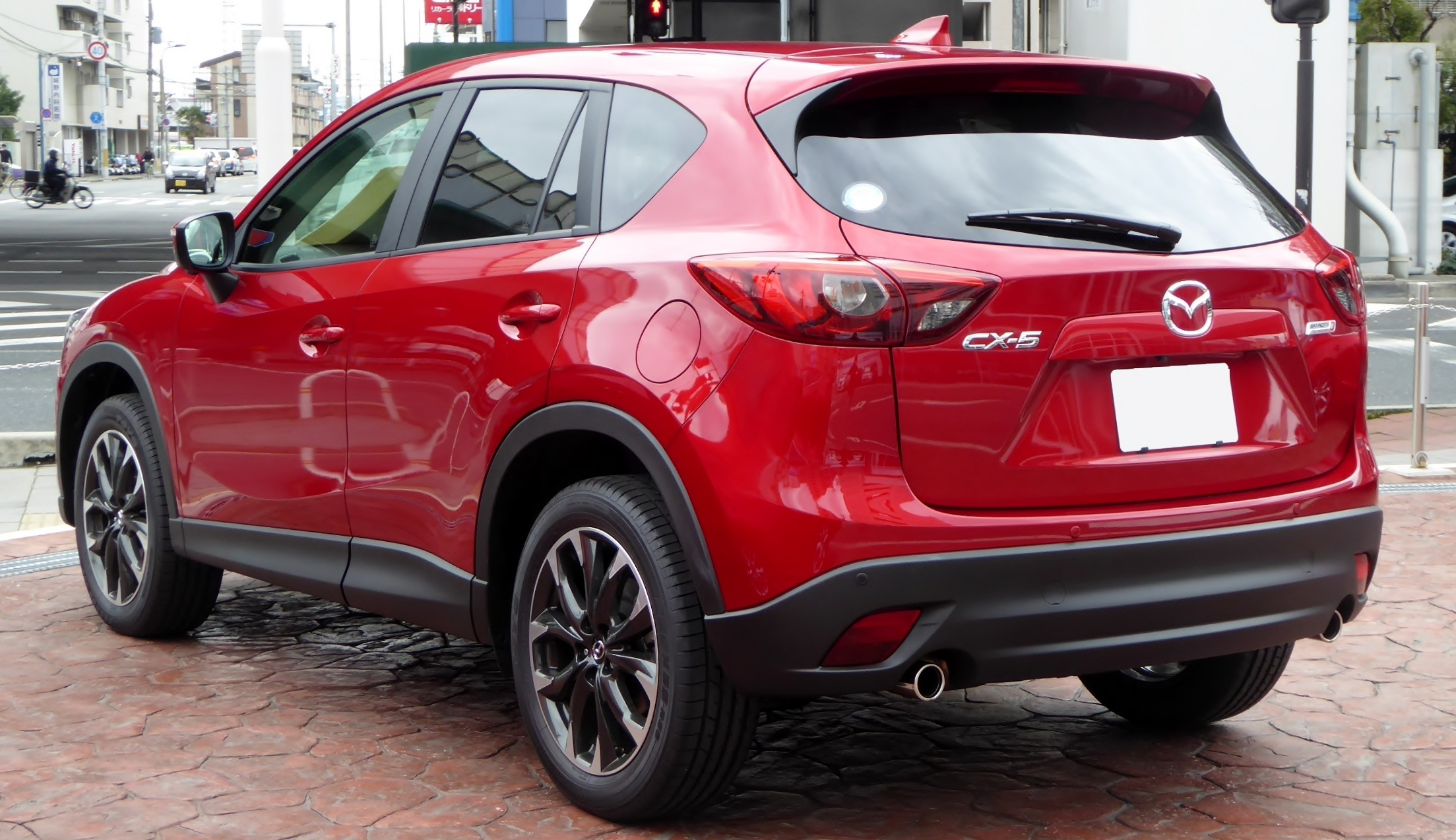
Rear view

=== Engine and drivetrain ===
The CX-5 is available with both front-wheel and all-wheel drive, powered by the PE-VPS 2.0-litre petrol four-cylinder engine capable of 121 kW (162 hp; 165 PS) and 210 N⋅m (155 lb⋅ft) averaging an estimated 28 mpg_{‑imp} (10 L/100 km; 23 mpg_{‑US}) and emitting around 139 g/km of carbon dioxide.

It is also available with the debuting SH-VPTS 2.2-litre two-stage turbocharged diesel engine with either 110 kW (148 hp; 150 PS) and 380 N⋅m (280 lb⋅ft), or 129 kW (173 hp; 175 PS) and 420 N⋅m (310 lb⋅ft), emitting an estimated 119 or 139 g/km of CO_{2}, respectively. Fuel consumption for the entry-level diesel engine with front-wheel drive is 63 mpg_{‑imp} (4.5 L/100 km; 52 mpg_{‑US}) on the European NEDC combined cycle.

=== Markets ===
==== Australia ====
The Australian version of the CX-5 was introduced in 2012 and was available in Maxx, Maxx Sport, Grand Touring and Akera trim levels. Initial models were available with either a 2.0 L petrol engine or a diesel engine, with front-wheel drive and all-wheel drive as options (FWD was only available with a 2.0-equipped CX-5). An automatic transmission was standard on all-wheel drive models, with manual available on the 2.0 Maxx FWD petrol).

==== Europe ====
Early European models included a choice of Skyactiv-G 2.0 and Skyactiv-D 2.2 engines.

==== Japan ====
The Japan domestic market CX-5 achieved monthly sales eight times higher than forecast just after its launch in February 2012, with the Skyactiv-D 2.2 diesel engine marketed as a "clean diesel" accounted for 73 percent of the sales.

==== Malaysia ====
The first-generation CX-5 was launched in Malaysia in May 2012 as a fully imported model. At launch, only one trim level was offered, with the 2.0 L Skyactiv-G engine and 6-speed automatic transmission with a choice of FWD or AWD. In June 2013, locally assembled models became available. The fully imported trim was renamed to High Spec, and a new lower trim level, Mid Spec, was launched. The Mid Spec was only available with FWD, while the High Spec continued to be offered with both FWD and AWD. In April 2015, a new base variant, dubbed the GL, was launched.

The first-generation facelift was launched in Malaysia in May 2015. Initially, the facelift version was fully imported and only available with the 2.5 L engine, but again, consumers could choose between FWD or AWD. The locally assembled facelift version was made available in early 2016 with either a 2.0 L Skyactiv-G engine or a 2.5 L Skyactiv-G engine. The 2.0 L engine could be had with only FWD but two trim levels: Mid Spec and High Spec, with Mid Spec being the more affordable of the two. The 2.5 L engine was only available with one trim level, but with either FWD or AWD. In July 2016, a 2.2 L Skyactiv-D powered, FWD, locally assembled variant was launched in Malaysia. It was positioned in between the 2.5 L Skyactiv-G FWD and 2.5 L Skyactiv-G AWD variant.

==== North America ====
The CX-5 debuted in the U.S. in November 2011 at the 2011 Los Angeles Auto Show. Initially, the only engine available was a direct-injected Skyactiv-G 2.0-litre inline-four petrol engine with 155 bhp (116 kW; 157 PS). It is rated at 26 and 32 mpg_{‑US} (9.0 and 7.4 L/100 km; 31 and 38 mpg_{‑imp}) in city and highway with the automatic transmission, which increases to 34 mpg_{‑US} (6.9 L/100 km; 41 mpg_{‑imp}) with the manual transmission.

For the 2014 model year, an optional 2.5-litre four-cylinder Skyactiv petrol engine was introduced to address the main criticism of the CX-5, lack of power. It is rated at 184 hp (137 kW; 187 PS) and 185 lb⋅ft (251 N⋅m), with EPA MPG ratings of 25 and 32 mpg_{‑US} (9.4 and 7.4 L/100 km; 30 and 38 mpg_{‑imp}) for the front-wheel drive model, decreasing to 24 and 30 mpg_{‑US} (9.8 and 7.8 L/100 km; 29 and 36 mpg_{‑imp}) with all-wheel drive. Only the six-speed automatic transmission is available for this engine, which is standard on the Touring and Grand Touring trim levels. The base Sport trim level is still offered with the 2.0 L engine. Front-wheel drive and all-wheel drive are offered for all trim levels.

The 2013 Mazda CX-5 was one of the five finalists for the 2013 Green Car of the Year awarded by the Green Car Journal at the 2012 Los Angeles Auto Show.

=== Safety ===
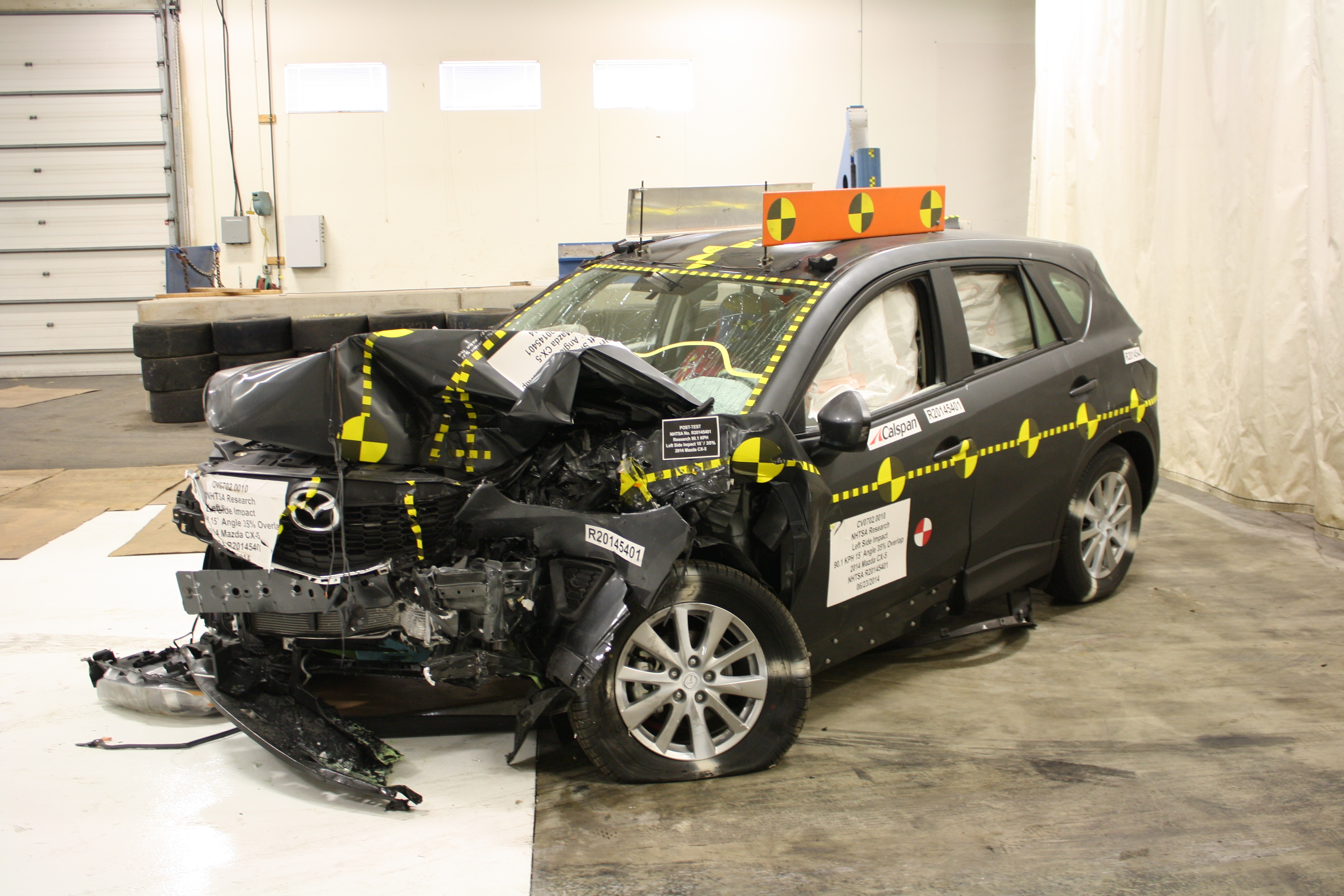
A 2014 Mazda CX-5 crash tested by the National Highway Traffic Safety Administration

According to the Insurance Institute for Highway Safety, the 2013 CX-5 achieved Good crash test ratings in the Moderate Overlap Front, Side, Roof Strength, and Head Restraint & Seats categories, while achieving only a Marginal rating in the Small Overlap Front crash test. Design changes were subsequently made that brought up the Small Overlap Front rating up to a Good rating.

The small overlap test, introduced in 2012 by the IIHS, simulates a frontal collision on 25 percent of the driver's side front corner. Since its adoption, the IIHS has noticed several automakers making non-symmetrical modifications to their vehicles to improve ratings. Another small overlap test was conducted on a number of vehicles, including a 2015 CX-5, but was conducted on the passenger side instead and earned an acceptable rating. Testing showed substantially more intrusion into the passenger side than into the driver's side of the CX-5.

ANCAP test results* Mazda CX-5 (2012)
Test	Score
Overall	5 /5 stars
Frontal offset	14.10/16
Side impact	16/16
Pole	2/2
Seat belt reminders	3/3
Whiplash protection	Good
Pedestrian protection	Adequate
Electronic stability control	Standard

== Second generation (KF; 2016) ==
Second generation
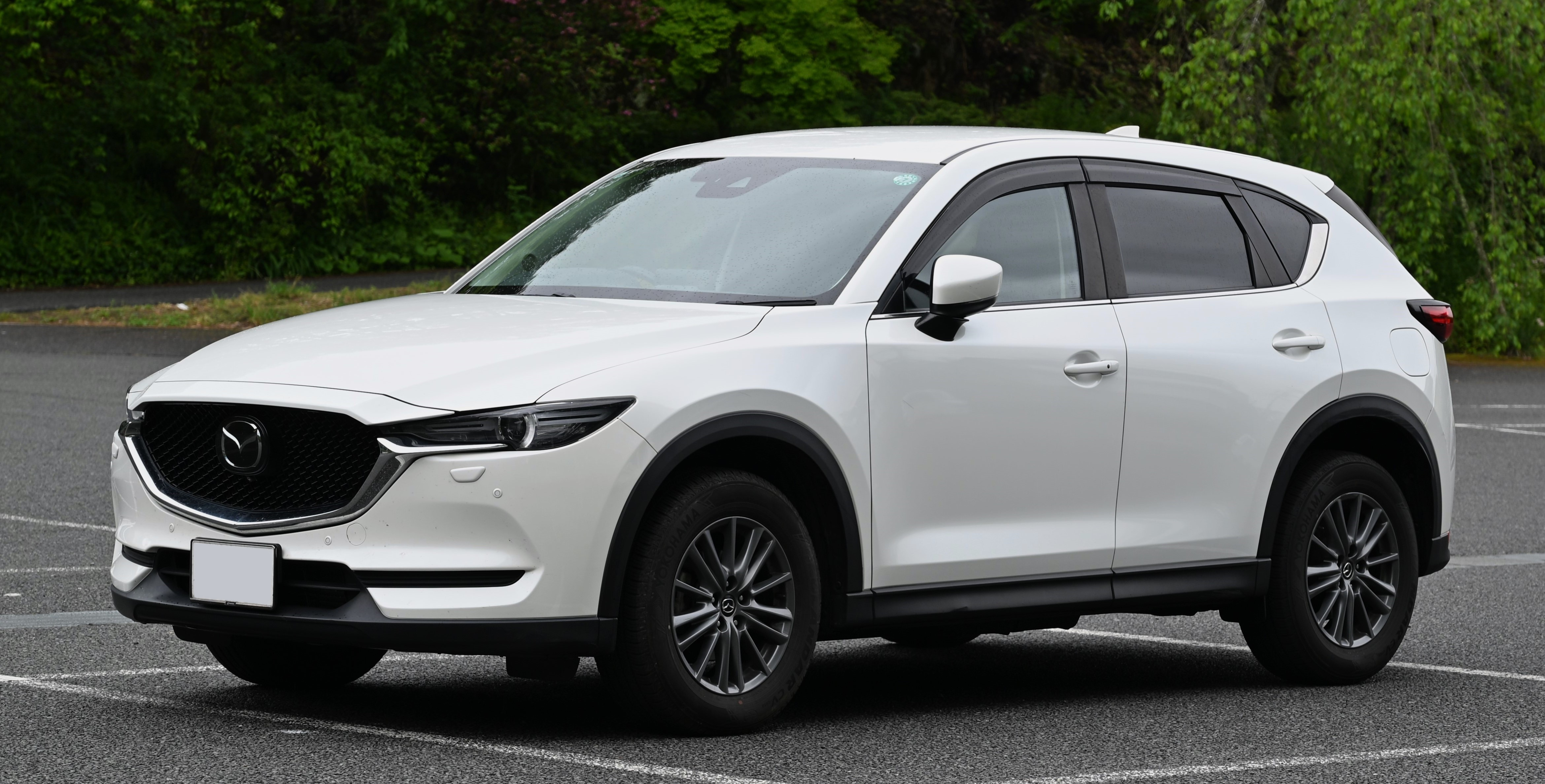
- 2020 Mazda CX-5 XD (pre-facelift)

Overview
- Model code: KF
- Production: November 2016 – 2025
- Model years: 2017–2025
- Assembly: Japan: Hiroshima (Ujina Plant No. 1, Ujina Plant No. 2); Hōfu (Hōfu Plant No. 2); Malaysia: Kulim (Inokom); China: Nanjing (Changan Mazda); Russia: Vladivostok (Mazda Sollers, until 2022); Vietnam: Chu Lai, Quảng Nam (THACO Auto)
- Designer: Ikuo Maeda (2012); Shinichi Isayama (2014)

Body and chassis
- Platform: Skyactiv-C/D
- Related: Mazda CX-8

Powertrain
- Engine: Petrol: 2.0 L Skyactiv-G PE-VPS I4; 2.5 L Skyactiv-G PY-VPS I4; 2.5 L Skyactiv-G PY-VPTS I4-T; Diesel: 2.2 L Skyactiv-D SH-VPTS I4
- Transmission: 6-speed Skyactiv-MT manual; 6-speed Skyactiv-Drive automatic

Dimensions
- Wheelbase: 2,700 mm (106.3 in)
- Length: 4,550 mm (179.1 in)
- Width: 1,840 mm (72.4 in)
- Height: 1,660–1,685 mm (65.4–66.3 in)
- Curb weight: 1,505–1,765 kg (3,318–3,891 lb)

The second-generation CX-5 was unveiled with an overhauled design and new technologies on 15 November 2016, at the Los Angeles Auto Show. The model is available with 2.0 Skyactiv-G petrol, 2.5 Skyactiv-G petrol and 2.2 Skyactiv-D diesel engines. New features include a new 'Soul Red Crystal' paint colour as well as a new remote-controlled powered tailgate.

In November 2018, Mazda added a new turbocharged petrol engine option from the CX-9 for the 2019 model year CX-5. It is a 2.5-litre Skyactiv-G turbocharged four-cylinder unit which produces 250 horsepower (190 kW; 250 PS) at 5,000 rpm on 93 AKI octane fuel and 227 hp on 87 AKI. Under U.S. fuel economy standards, Mazda claims the new engine delivers 22, 27 and 24 mpg_{‑US} (10.7, 8.7 and 9.8 L/100 km; 26, 32 and 29 mpg_{‑imp}) in city, highway and combined, respectively with AWD, regardless of octane.

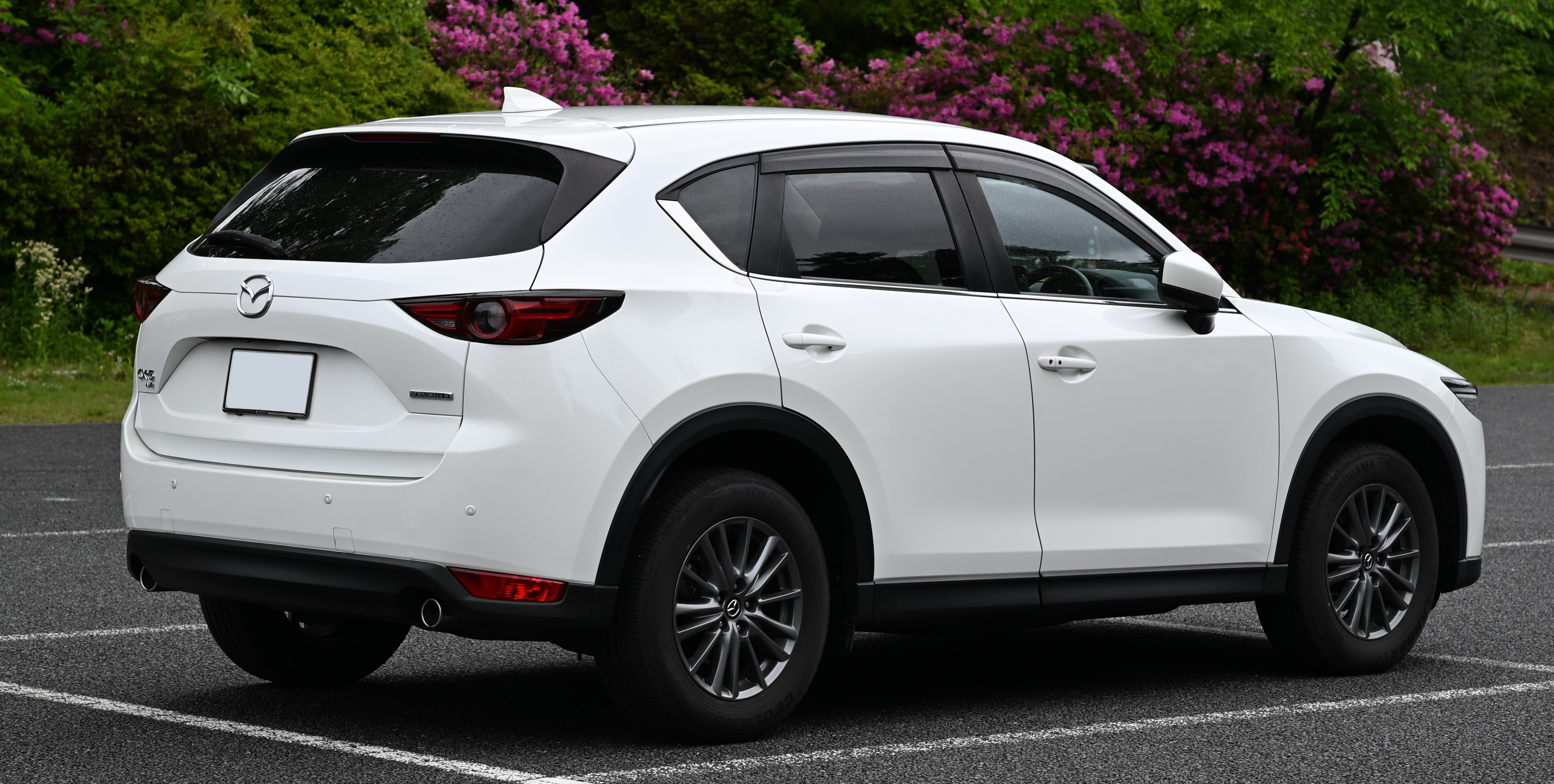
Rear view (pre-facelift)

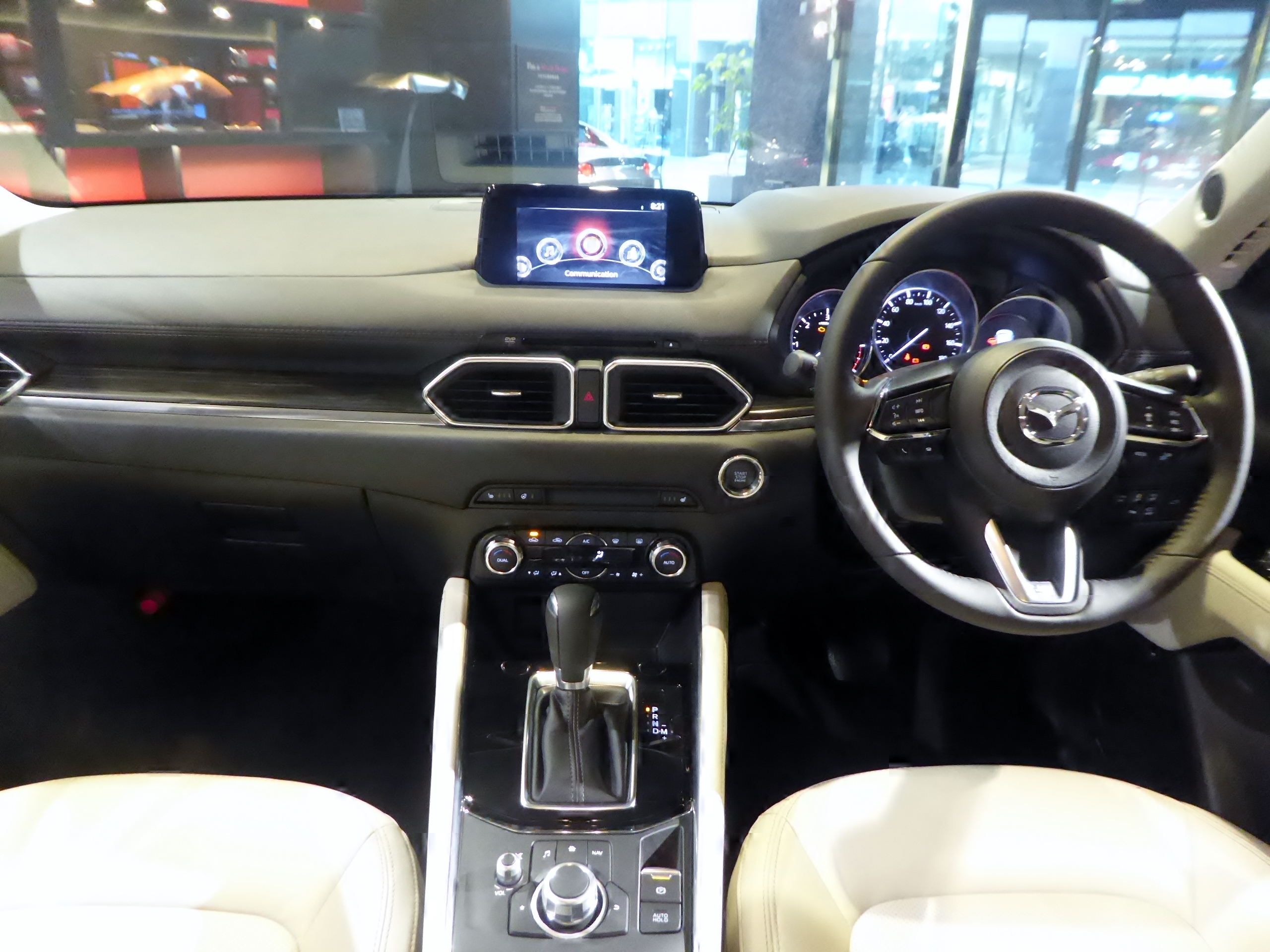
Interior

=== Facelift ===
In September 2021, Mazda revealed a facelift for the second-generation CX-5 with updated styling and kit. Highlights include restyled bumpers and tailgate with new headlights and tail lights, larger tailpipes, a new Mi-Drive drive selector control, updated seats, and wireless charging. It is also equipped with revised suspension. The dampening control structure was improved and frame rigidity was increased, helping to reduce vibrations and road noise.

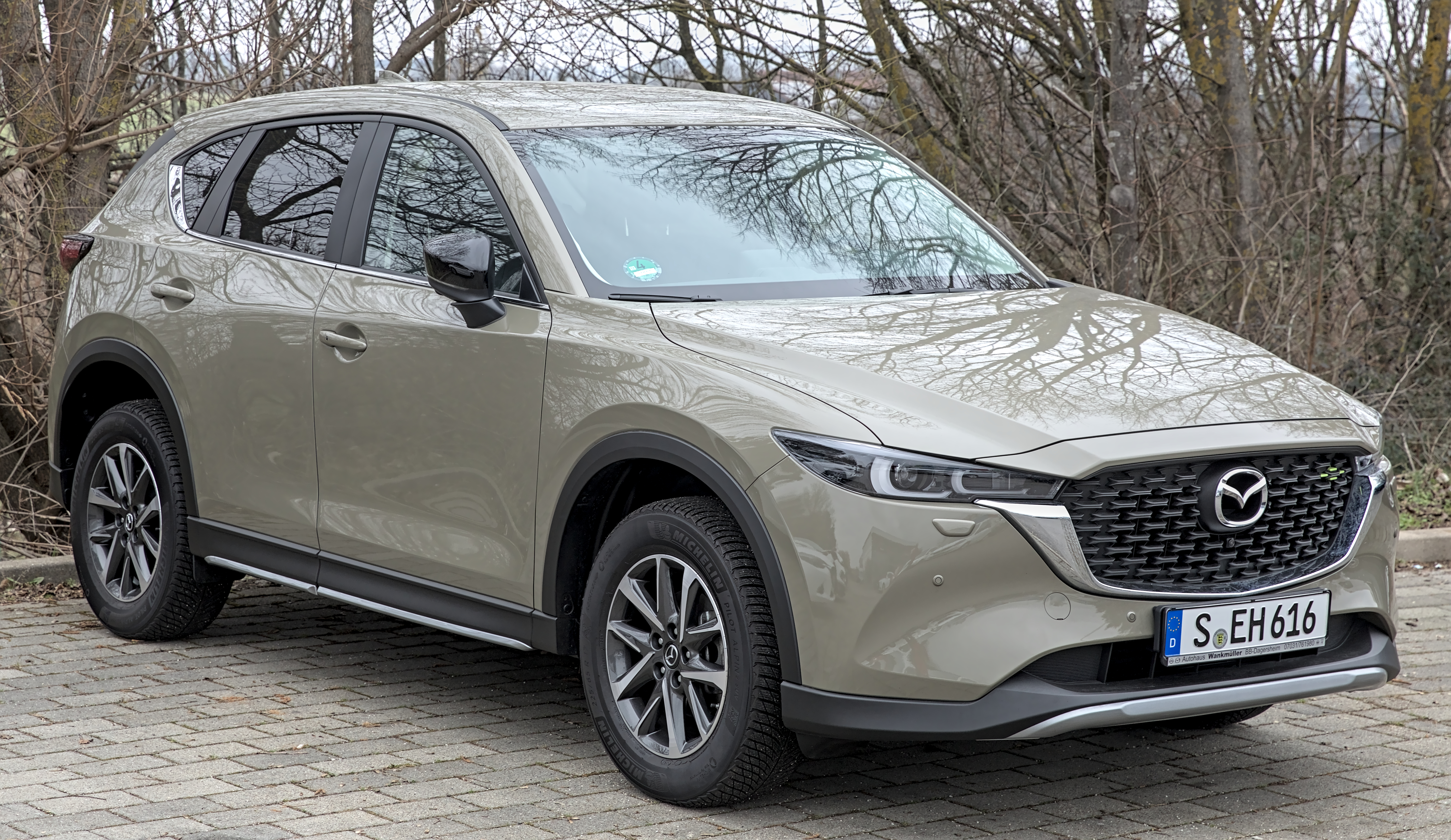
Mazda CX-5 (facelift)

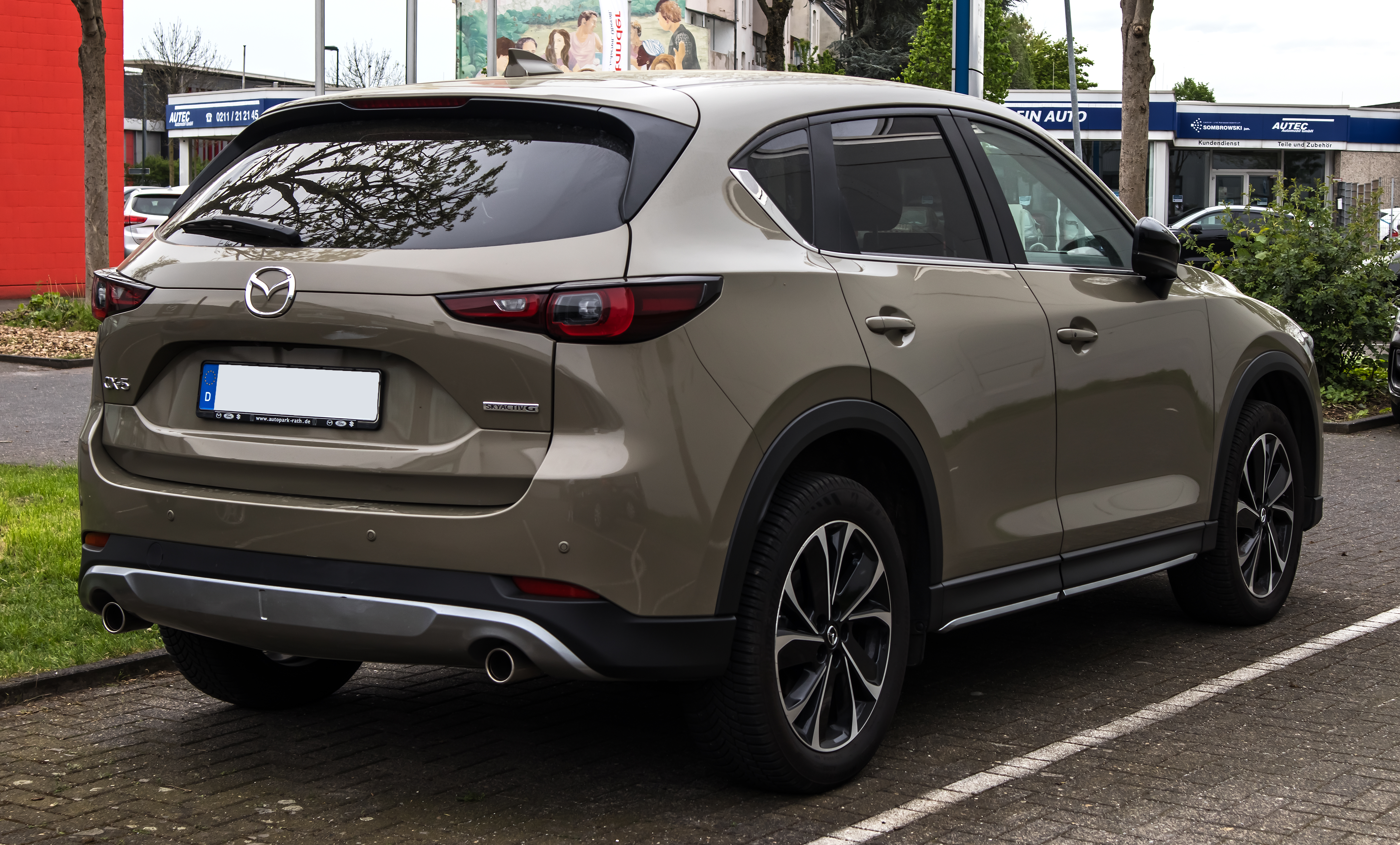
Rear view

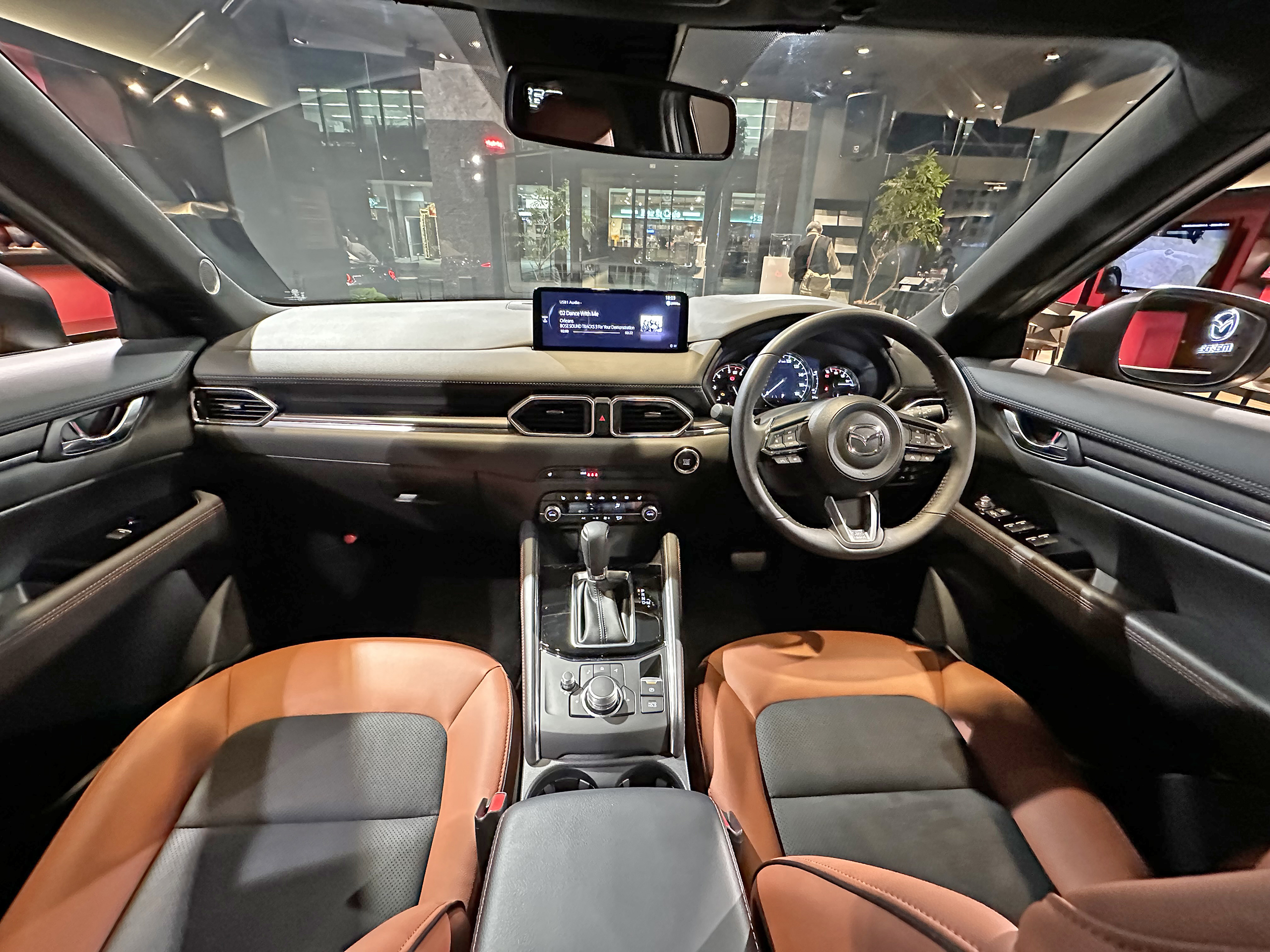
Interior

=== Markets ===
==== Americas ====
===== Mexico =====
The second-generation CX-5 was launched in Mexico in March 2017, with three trim levels: i, i Sport and Grand Touring. Two engine options were available: a 2.0 Skyactiv-G petrol and a 2.5 Skyactiv-G petrol. In November 2018, the 2.5T Skyactiv-G petrol was introduced in Mexico for the Signature trim.

The facelifted CX-5 debuted in Mexico on 13 January 2022 with variants remained unchanged from the pre-facelift model.

===== North America =====
In the U.S., the 2017 CX-5 was offered with front-wheel or all-wheel drive in Sport, Touring and Grand Touring trims. The Sport and Touring models came with 17-inch wheels, while the GT had 19-inch wheels. The 2.5-litre Skyactiv-G 16-valve DOHC 4-cylinder engine with VVT was the only choice offered for the 2017 model year.

Mazda announced the availability of a diesel engine for 2017; however, that engine did not arrive in the US until the 2019 model year. The diesel engine was only sold for the 2019 model year and was only offered on the Signature trim level. Mazda cited low consumer demand as well as emissions certification issues.

In 2017, for the 2018 model year, Mazda added standard cylinder deactivation and made the i-Activsense Package available on the Sport trim.

In 2018, for the 2019 model year, Mazda made available a new turbocharged SKYACTIV-G 2.5T engine and added new Grand Touring Reserve and Signature range-topping trims. A torque vectoring system marketed as G-Vectoring Control Plus was also added on all models.

Changes in 2019 for the 2020 model year included a new key fob design, an updated font used throughout the vehicle, a new Cylinder Deactivation System status display in the infotainment system. Mazda also made automatic headlights, i-Activsense safety features, and automatic rain-sensing windshield wipers standard and the Grand Touring trim received paddle shifters. Mazda claimed to have also improved road noise, vibration, and harshness across all trims. The Grand Touring Reserve trim received a new Engine Harmonics Enhancer to simulate engine noise, a new off-road traction assist system, and a new eight-inch infotainment system.

In 2020 for the 2021 model year, Mazda introduced a new standard 10.25-inch infotainment system with new Mazda Connect Software. A new Touring Preferred SV Package was offered as well as a new Carbon Edition trim, which offered exclusive exterior and interior styling elements. Models equipped with the 2.5 Turbo engine received a new turbo badge. Signature trims received new safety features such as reverse automatic braking and driver attention alert as well as improved clarity for the 360-degree camera.

In 2021 for the 2022 model year, Mazda introduced new 17-inch wheels for the S trim. All models became equipped with standard all-wheel drive and horsepower for the turbo engine was increased from 250 to 256 horsepower (186 to 191 kW; 253 to 260 PS) while using 93 octane fuel. Mazda also revised the naming of trims.

In 2022 for the 2023 model year, Mazda has introduced a new colour Rhodium White.

In 2023 for the 2024 model year, the Carbon Edition trim became available with the turbocharged engine. Models with the naturally aspirated 2.5L engine may lack cylinder deactivation and engine start/stop due to parts supply issues, and have EPA ratings of 23, 29 and 25 mpg_{‑US} (10.2, 8.1 and 9.4 L/100 km; 28, 35 and 30 mpg_{‑imp}) city, highway and combined respectively, instead of 26, 31 and 28 mpg_{‑US} (9.0, 7.6 and 8.4 L/100 km; 31, 37 and 34 mpg_{‑imp}), approximately a 12% increase in fuel usage.

==== Asia ====
===== Indonesia =====
The second-generation CX-5 was launched on 11 August 2017 at the 27th Gaikindo Indonesia International Auto Show, with two trim levels: GT and Elite, it is powered by a 2.5 Skyactiv-G petrol engine.

The facelifted CX-5 was launched in Indonesia on 1 April 2022, with two trim levels: Elite and Kuro Edition. Like the pre-facelift model, the facelifted is powered by a 2.5 Skyactiv-G petrol engine. In November 2023, the CX-5 line-up was updated which included the Kuro Edition trim received all-wheel drive as standard.

===== Japan =====
The second-generation CX-5 was released in Japan on 2 February 2017, with eight variants. Three engine options were available: a 2.0 Skyactiv-G petrol (20S), a 2.5 Skyactiv-G (25S) petrol and a 2.2 Skyactiv-D diesel (XD). An all-wheel drive option was available for the 25S and XD engines. In October 2018, the 2.5T Skyactiv-G petrol engine (25T) was first introduced in Japan.

The facelifted CX-5 was released in Japan on 8 November 2021. The facelift model saw the (25T) engine discontinued and, leaving only two gasoline models: 20S, and 25S. The XD grade has been consolidated into two grades: XD Proactive, and XD L Package.

On September 2023, some variants and manual transmission variant was discontinued, leaving only the automatic transmission.

===== Malaysia =====
The second-generation Mazda CX-5 was launched in Malaysia on 11 October 2017, with five variants at launch: 2.0 2WD GL, 2.0 2WD GLS, 2.5 2WD GLS, 2.2D 2WD GLS and 2.2D AWD GLS. All CX-5 variants are locally assembled in Inokom plant in the Kulim District, Kedah. In October 2019, the Mazda CX-5 line-up was updated, with five variants available. As part of the update, the variants were renamed: 2.0 2WD Mid, 2.0 2WD High, 2.5 2WD High, 2.2D 2WD High, and 2.5 Turbo 4WD High.

The facelifted CX-5 was launched in Malaysia on 29 January 2024, with variants remain unchanged from the pre-facelift model.

===== Philippines =====
The second-generation CX-5 made its ASEAN debut in the Philippines on 30 March 2017 at the 13th Manila International Auto Show, with three variants: 2.0 FWD Pro, 2.5 AWD Sport and 2.2D AWD Sport. In October 2019, the entry-level 2.0 FWD Sport variant was added. In February 2020, the 2.2D AWD Signature variant was added as the flagship variant.

The facelifted CX-5 debuted in the Philippines on 16 June 2022. The facelifted line-up saw the two diesel variants replaced by the 2.5 AWD Turbo variant and the Pro variants were dropped.

===== Singapore =====
The second-generation CX-5 was launched on 13 July 2017, with four trim levels: Standard Plus, Premium, Luxury and Super Luxury. Two engine options were available: a 2.0 Skyactiv-G petrol and a 2.5 Skyactiv-G petrol.

The facelifted CX-5 debuted in Singapore on 12 August 2022, with three trim levels: Elegance, Luxury and Luxury Sports. Only one engine option is available: a 2.0 Skyactiv-G petrol engine.

===== Taiwan =====
The second-generation CX-5 was launched in Taiwan on 10 April 2017, with five variants: Sky-G Premium, Sky-G Top-of-the-line, Sky-G Flagship, Sky-D Top-of-the-line and Sky-D AWD Flagship. Two engine options were available: a 2.0 Skyactiv-G petrol (Sky-G) and a 2.2 Skyactiv-D diesel (Sky-D).

The facelifted CX-5 was launched in Taiwan on 11 February 2022, with five variants: 20S Carbon Edition, 20S Carbon Edition Plus, 20S Premium, 25T 2WD Sport Edition and 25T AWD Signature. Two engine options were available: a 2.0 Skyactiv-G petrol (20S) and a 2.5T Skyactiv-G petrol engine (25T).

===== Thailand =====
The second-generation CX-5 was launched in Thailand on 13 November 2017, fully imported from Malaysia, with five variants available at launch: 2.0 C, 2.0 S, 2.0 SP, 2.2 XD and 2.2 XDL. Two engine options were available: a 2.0 Skyactiv-G petrol and a 2.2 Skyactiv-D diesel. In October 2019, the 2.5 turbo petrol AWD High Plus (SP) variant was added. In October 2021, the CX-5 line-up was updated in terms of equipment across all variants. The 2.0 S and 2.2 XD variants were discontinued.

The facelifted CX-5 was launched in Thailand on 11 November 2024 with variants remain unchanged from the pre-facelift model. The 2.5 Turbo SP variant was discontinued.

===== Vietnam =====
The second-generation CX-5 was launched in Vietnam on 18 November 2017, with three variants available at launch: 2.0 2WD, 2.5 2WD and 2.5 AWD. Two engine options were available: a 2.0 Skyactiv-G petrol and a 2.5 Skyactiv-G petrol. All CX-5 variants were locally assembled at the THACO Auto plant. In July 2019, the CX-5 range was updated and restructured into four variants: 2.0 Deluxe, 2.0 Luxury, 2.0 Premium and 2.5 Signature Premium.

The facelifted CX-5 was launched in Vietnam on 8 July 2023 and the range was restructured into three trim levels: Deluxe, Luxury and Premium. The Premium trim could be specified with Sport and Exclusive packages. For the facelift model, there was only one engine option: a 2.0 Skyactiv-G petrol engine. In September 2023, the 2.5 Skyactiv-G petrol engine option return to the line-up for the Signature trim, which can be specified with Sport and Exclusive packages.

==== Europe ====
The second-generation CX-5 made its European debut in May 2017. Two engine options were available at launch: a 2.0 Skyactiv-G petrol and a 2.2 Skyactiv-D diesel. The latter option was available with the all-wheel drive option. In November 2022, the 2.0 e-Skyactiv G petrol and 2.2 e-Skyactiv D engines equipped with Mazda's M Hybrid mild hybrid technology was made available for the CX-5 primarily for the European market.

==== Oceania ====
===== Australia =====
The second-generation CX-5 was launched in Australia on 31 March 2017, with five trim levels: Maxx, Maxx Sport, Touring, GT and Akera. Three engine options were available: a 2.0 Skyactiv-G petrol, a 2.5 Skyactiv-G petrol and a 2.2 Skyactiv-D diesel. All trim levels except the Maxx and Maxx Sport comes with all-wheel drive as standard. In November 2018, the 2.5T Skyactiv-G petrol engine was introduced in Australia for the GT and Akera trims. In February 2021, the sportier GT SP trim was added.

The facelifted CX-5 debuted in Australia on 4 January 2022, with the number of variants reduced from 16 to 12. The facelifted model saw the GT trim discontinued and the addition of the new Active trim. In October 2022, the manual gearbox option was dropped due to slow sales, as they represented only 1% of CX-5 total sales in Australia in the first half of 2021. In October 2023, the CX-5 line-up in Australia became petrol-only with diesel engines dropped due to slow sales. In July 2025, the CX-5 line-up was updated with trims received new features and the G25 Touring variant became available with the front-wheel drive option.

===== New Zealand =====
The second-generation CX-5 was launched in New Zealand in April 2017, with three trim levels: GLX, GSX and Limited. Three engine options are available: a 2.0 Skyactiv-G petrol, a 2.5 Skyactiv-G petrol and a 2.2 Skyactiv-D diesel.

The facelifted CX-5 debuted in New Zealand in April 2022, with the addition of the new Activ trim.

==== South Africa ====
The second-generation CX-5 was launched in South Africa on 1 June 2017, with four trim levels: Active, Dynamic, Individual and Akera. Three engine options were available: a 2.0 Skyactiv-G petrol, a 2.5 Skyactiv-G petrol and a 2.2 Skyactiv-D diesel. In January 2021, the Carbon Edition trim was added to the range powered by a 2.0 Skyactiv-G petrol engine.

The facelifted CX-5 debuted in South Africa on 18 March 2022, with the Dynamic manual variant was dropped for the facelift model.

=== Safety ===
Euro NCAP test results* Mazda CX-5 (2017)
Test	Points	%
Overall:	5 /5 stars	
Adult occupant:	36.5	95%
Child occupant:	39.4	80%
Pedestrian:	32.8	78%
Safety assist:	7.1	59%

IIHS scores (2018)
Small overlap front (driver)	Good	
Small overlap front (passenger)	Good	
Moderate overlap front (original test)	Good	
Side (original test)	Good	
Side (updated test)	Good	
Roof strength	Good	
Head restraints and seats	Good	
Headlights	Acceptable	Marginal
Front crash prevention: vehicle-to-vehicle (optional system)	Superior	
Front crash prevention: vehicle-to-vehicle (standard system)	Advanced	
Child seat anchors (LATCH) ease of use	Acceptable	

ANCAP test results* Mazda CX-5 (2016)
Test	Score
Overall	5 /5 stars
Frontal offset	14.10/16
Side impact	16/16
Pole	2/2
Seat belt reminders	3/3
Whiplash protection	Good
Pedestrian protection	Adequate
Electronic stability control	Standard

ANCAP test results* Mazda CX-5 (2017, aligned with Euro NCAP)
Test	Points	%
Overall:	5 /5 stars	
Adult occupant:	36.4	95%
Child occupant:	39.3	80%
Pedestrian:	32.7	78%
Safety assist:	7.1	59%

== Third generation (KM; 2025) ==
Third generation
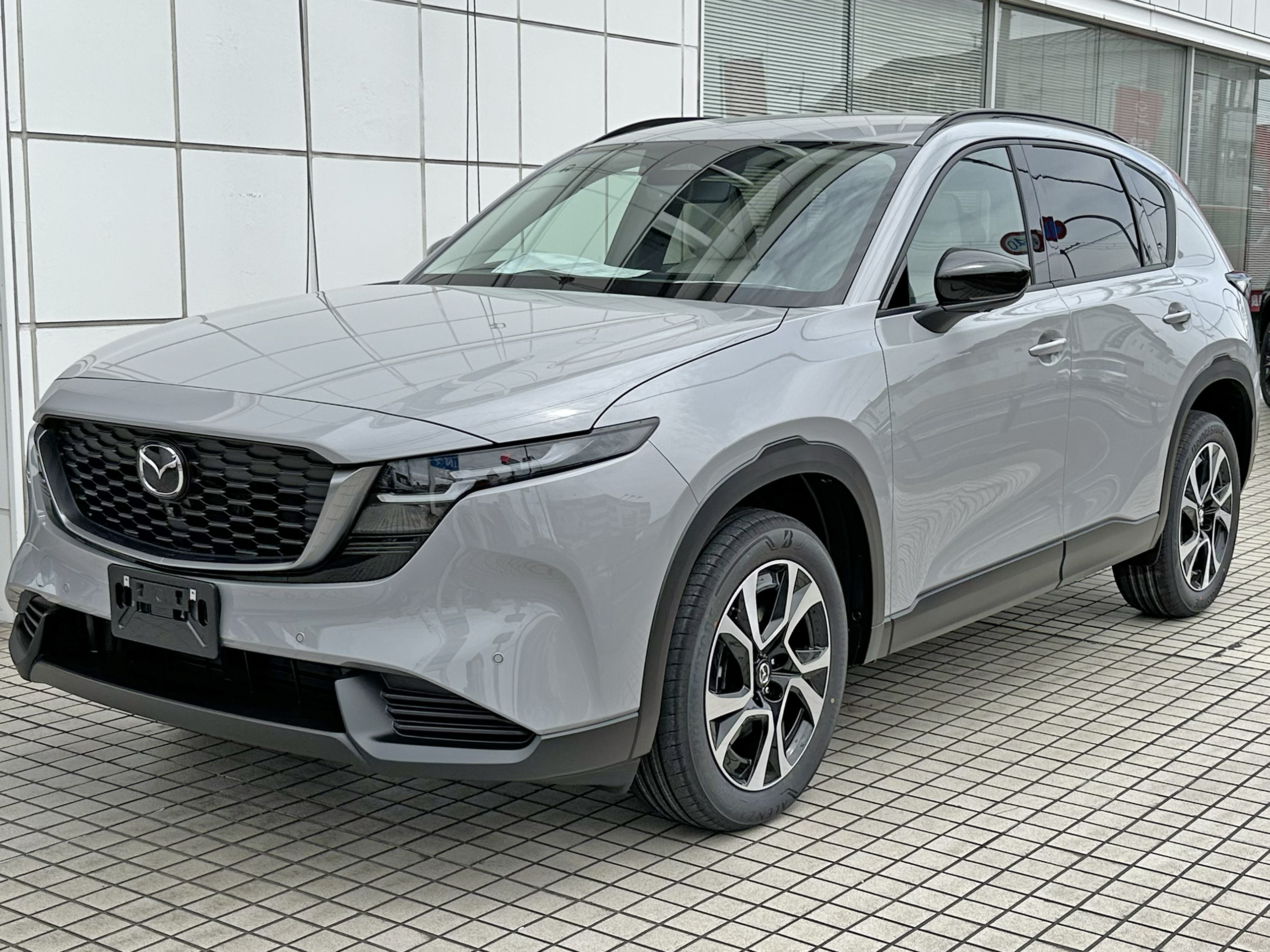

Overview
- Model code: KM
- Production: 2025–present
- Model years: 2026–present
- Designer: Takanori Tsubaki (as chief designer)

Body and chassis
- Related: Mazda CX-50

Powertrain
- Engine: Petrol: 2.5 L Skyactiv-G PY-VPS I4; 2.5 L Skyactiv-G PY-VPS I4 mild hybrid
- Transmission: 6-speed Skyactiv-Drive automatic
- Hybrid drivetrain: Mazda M Hybrid (mild hybrid)

Dimensions
- Wheelbase: 2,815 mm (110.8 in)
- Length: 4,690 mm (184.6 in)
- Width: 1,860 mm (73.2 in)
- Height: 1,695 mm (66.7 in)
- Curb weight: 1,629–1,770 kg (3,591–3,902 lb)

The third-generation CX-5 was revealed on 10 July 2025.

The wheelbase of the third-generation model was increased by 75 mm (3.0 in) for increased interior space and handling stability. The CX-5 has wider opening rear doors and is available with an optional panoramic sunroof. Compared to the previous model, the boot is 50 mm (2.0 in) longer and 25 mm (0.98 in) higher and the lower lift-in height was lowered by 13 mm (0.51 in).

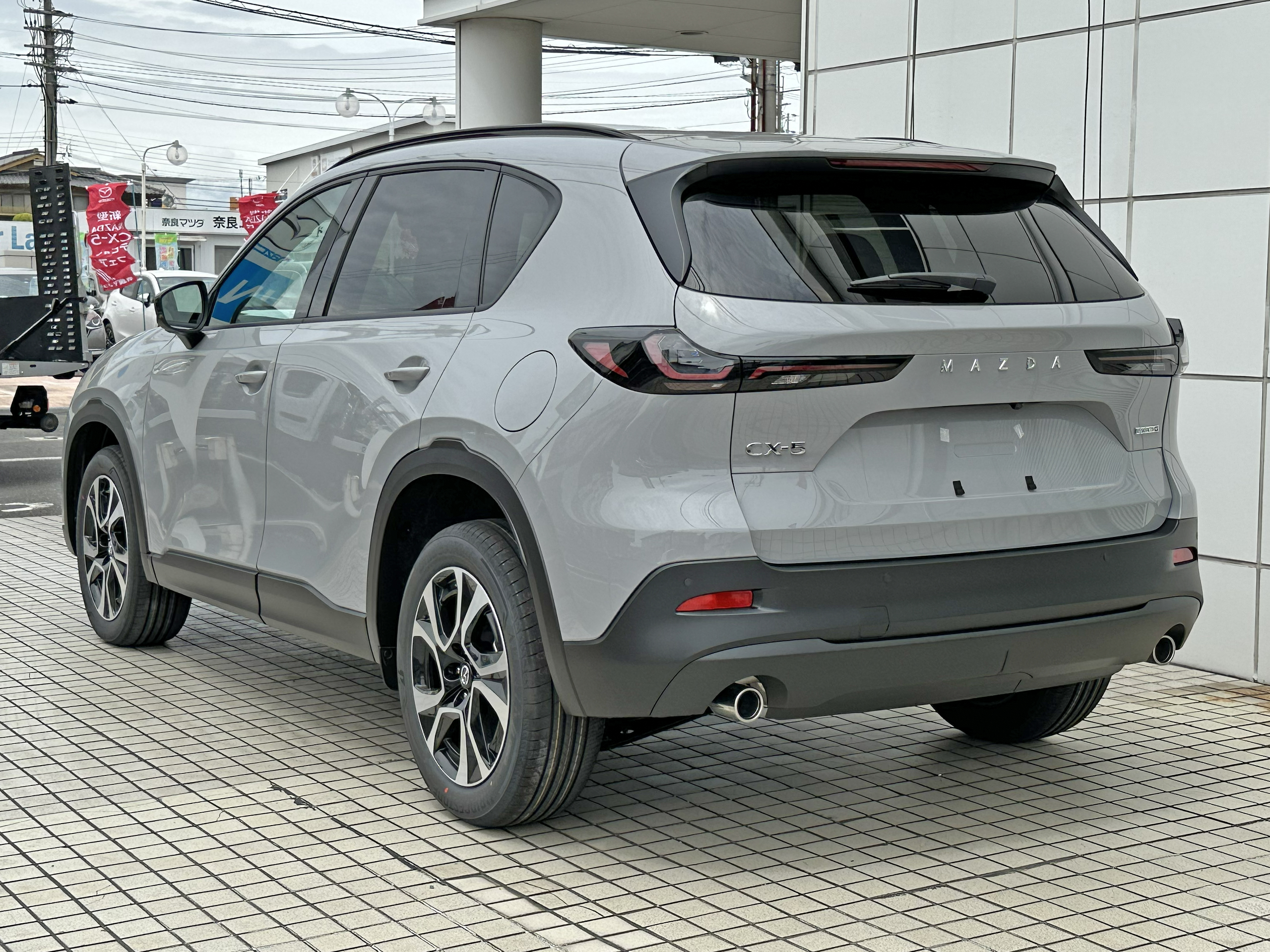
Rear view

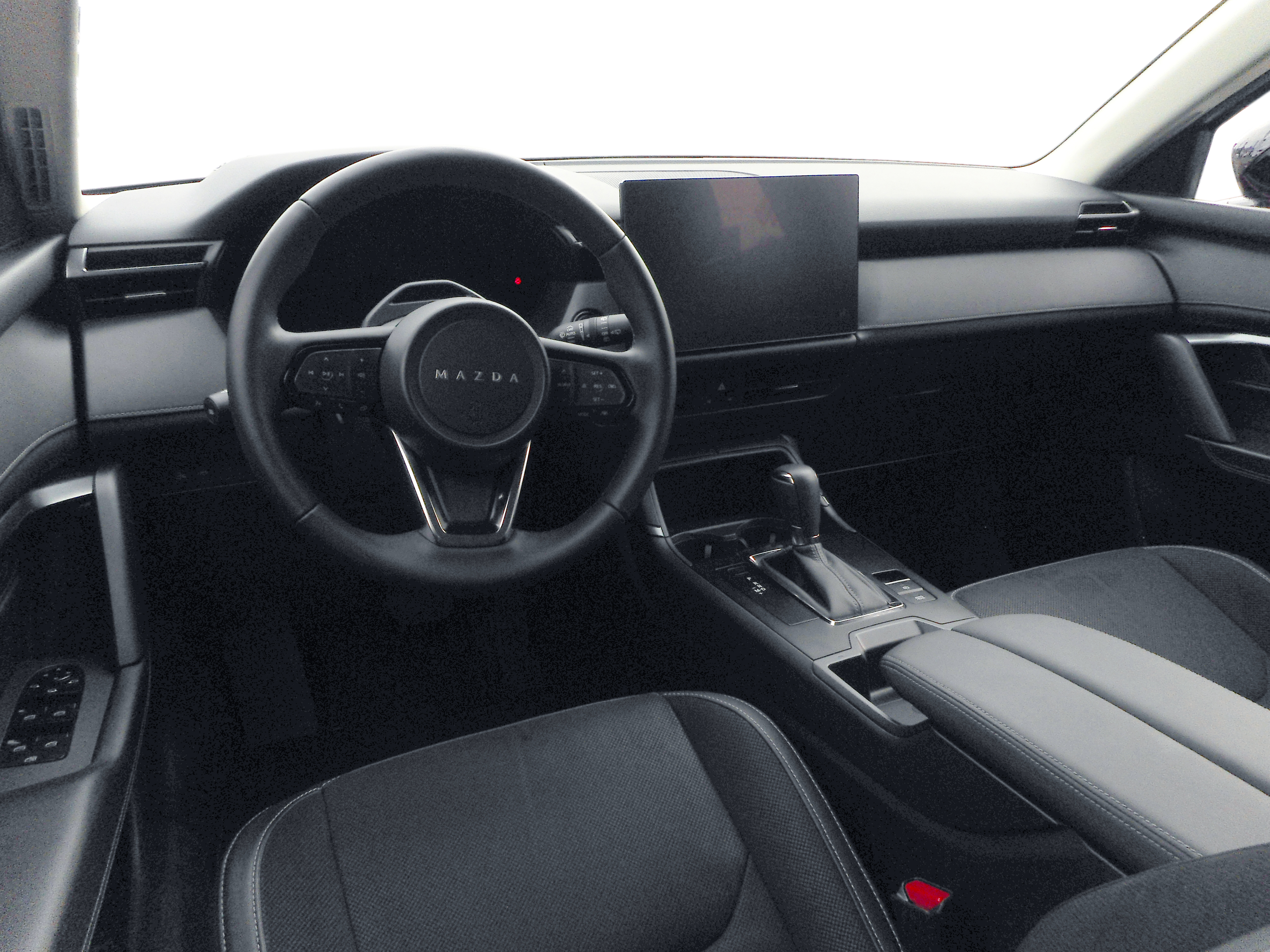
Interior

=== Exterior ===
The third-generation CX-5 features an updated version of Mazda's Kodo design language such as a new stacked headlight design, updated taillights, and Mazda lettering placed on the tailgate.

Mazda claims the front fascia is wider and more sculpted, with a wider front grille, slimmer headlights and new daytime running lights signature. For the side, the CX-5 features a core design element which is the cladding on the wheel arches and bottom of the car, modelled after a Japanese woodworking principle called "Kigumi." The CX-5 is also equipped with 19-inch alloy wheels, that Mazda claims the design that "embodies flexibility and approachability." The rear fascia has slimmer taillights inspired from the CX-90 model, the traditional Mazda logo was replaced with Mazda lettering used on the tailgate, and dual exhaust outlets.

Stefan Meisterfeld, VP of Strategic Planning for Mazda North America, explained to Motor1, "I would say the new CX-5 is a pioneer of a slightly evolved design language. Some elements of it you may see on future vehicles as well... It's our future direction. And yeah, you would see more of these elements in future vehicles."

=== Interior ===
The interior of the third-generation CX-5 has a driver-first concept approach with the use of fewer physical controls. There is a 10.25-inch digital instrument cluster, a 15.6-inch touchscreen (the largest sized touchscreen display offered in a Mazda product), ambient lighting system with seven colour choices, a redesigned three-spoke steering wheel with Mazda lettering, Cognac leather upholstery, Qi wireless charger in front of the gear selector, a split design for the front centre armrest, and the increased use of soft materials used on the major interior touchpoints.

For the infotainment, the CX-5 was the first Mazda product to use Google built-in services for the infotainment system. Entry-level variants feature a 12.9-inch touchscreen which is mounted higher on the dashboard and is operated by a rotary knob (unless the vehicle is stationary, it can also be operated through limited touchscreen inputs). Wireless compatibility for Android Auto and Apple CarPlay comes standard.

Tamara Mlynarczyk, manager of public affairs for Mazda North American Operations, explained to Motor1 about the decision to eliminate most traditional controls in the third-generation model was based on an internal study which showed customers preferred to have a large infotainment system:

"Based on customer feedback, we developed a new human-machine interface (HMI) that prioritises ease of use while maintaining Mazda's safe driving philosophy. The new CX-5 changes from a commander to a touchscreen centre display, which is the most suitable means to minimise the 'hands' away from the steering wheel while implementing:

• Advanced voice recognition allowing the driver to operate vehicle functions like the air conditioning, audio, and navigation systems;

• Human-centric steering wheel switches allowing the driver to operate the controls without placing a burden on human attention resources," said Mlynarczyk.

=== Powertrains ===
The 2.5-litre Skyactiv-G PY-VPS petrol engine carried over from the previous model, Mazda claims the engine was recalibrated "with an emphasis on offering both sharper response and also a more relaxed, quiet demeanour". In Europe, Japan and other markets, the 2.5-litre Skyactiv-G PY-VPS petrol engine features Mazda's M Hybrid 24-volt mild hybrid and a brake-by-wire system.

Unlike the previous model, the third-generation CX-5 is not available with the 2.0 Skyactiv-G petrol, turbocharged engines and diesel engines.

Mazda confirmed the Skyactiv-Z engine equipped with the Mazda Hybrid System developed in-house, is scheduled to debut in 2027.

=== Markets ===
==== Africa ====
===== South Africa =====
The CX-5 was launched in South Africa on 13 August 2026, with four trim levels: Active, Dynamic, Individual and Homura, it is powered by the 2.5-litre Skyactiv-G PY-VPS.

==== Asia ====
===== Brunei =====
The third-generation CX-5 was launched in Brunei on 2 October 2026 and it is available with two variants in front-wheel-drive and all-wheel-drive, all powered by the 2.5-litre Skyactiv-G PY-VPS naturally-aspirated engine.

===== Indonesia =====
The third-generation CX-5 was launched in Indonesia on 29 July 2026 at the 33rd Indonesia International Auto Show, alongside the CKD-built CX-30 and Mazda 6e, it is available with two trim levels: Sport and Kuro, powered by the 2.5-litre Skyactiv-G PY-VPS and comes standard with front-wheel drive.

===== Cambodia =====
The third-generation CX-5 was launched in Cambodia on 12 September 2026, with sole variants: 2.5 2WD, powered by the 2.5-litre Skyactiv-G PY-VPS.

===== Japan =====
The third-generation CX-5 was released in Japan on 21 May 2026. In Japan, it was available with three trim levels: S, G, and L. All Japanese-market CX-5 powered by the 2.5-litre Skyactiv-G PY-VPS M hybrid, with front-wheel and all-wheel drive variants. The G EX Package includes optional advanced safety features and a BOSE sound system.

On 23 June 2026, Mazda recorded over 10,000 orders for the third-generation Mazda CX-5 since sales commenced in the previous month.

===== Laos =====
The third-generation CX-5 was launched in Laos on 7 October 2026, with sole variants: 2.5 AWD, powered by the 2.5-litre Skyactiv-G PY-VPS.

===== Malaysia =====
The third-generation CX-5 was previewed in Malaysia on 11 June 2026 at the Kuala Lumpur International Mobility Show 2026, and launched on 8 October 2026, with two variants: 2.5 High and 2.5 High with Panoramic Sunroof, powered by the 2.5-litre Skyactiv-G PY-VPS.

===== Philippines =====
The third-generation CX-5 was launched in the Philippines on 20 August 2026, with a single variant: Premium Plus, powered by the 2.5-litre Skyactiv-G PY-VPS M hybrid and comes standard with all-wheel drive.

===== Taiwan =====
The third-generation CX-5 was launched in Taiwan on 18 August 2026, with four variants: 25S AWD Elite, 25S AWD Exclusive, 25S AWD Premium and 25S AWD Premium Plus, it is powered by the 2.5-litre Skyactiv-G PY-VPS.

==== Mexico ====
The third-generation CX-5 was launched in Mexico on 6 March 2026, with three trim levels: i Sport, i Grand Touring and Signature, it is powered by the 2.5-litre Skyactiv-G PY-VPS.

==== North America ====
The third-generation CX-5 was released in the North American market in January 2026 for the 2026 model year. In the US, it is available with five trim levels: Standard, Select, Preferred, Premium and Premium Plus. In Canada, it is available with three trim levels: GX, GS and GT (also available with the Panoramic Roof and Premium packages). For the North American market, all CX-5 variants are powered by the 2.5-litre Skyactiv-G petrol (2.5S).

==== Oceania ====
===== Australia =====
The third-generation CX-5 went on sale in Australia on 24 March 2026, with five trim levels: Pure, Evolve, Touring, GT SP and Akera. All Australian-market variants are powered by the 2.5-litre Skyactiv-G petrol (G25) produces 132 kW (177 hp; 179 PS) and 242 N⋅m (178 lb⋅ft) and with all-wheel drive is standard. Compared to the previous model, the 2.5-litre Skyactiv-G petrol (G25) produces 8 kW (11 hp; 11 PS) less power and 10 N⋅m (7.4 lb⋅ft) less torque, due to Australia's mandating emissions systems, aligned with the Euro 6d European emission standards. For the Australian market, Mazda chose to not offer the 2.5-litre Skyactiv-G petrol equipped with Mazda's M Hybrid mild hybrid technology because it was compromised for Australian customer needs and the New Vehicle Efficiency Standard (NVES) in Australia for CO2 emissions is different to the European legislation.

===== New Zealand =====
The third-generation CX-5 went on sale in New Zealand on 5 March 2026, with four trim levels: Touring, SP, Homura and Takami. For powertrains, all variants are powered by the 2.5-litre Skyactiv-G petrol.

=== Safety ===
ANCAP test results Mazda CX-5 (2025, aligned with Euro NCAP)
Test	Points	%
Overall:	5 /5 stars	
Adult occupant:	36.15	90%
Child occupant:	45.00	91%
Pedestrian:	58.63	93%
Safety assist:	15.72	87%

Euro NCAP test results Mazda CX-5 2.5L MHEV 'Core Plus' (LHD) (2025)
Test	Points	%
Overall:	5 /5 stars	
Adult occupant:	36.1	90%
Child occupant:	44.0	89%
Pedestrian:	58.6	93%
Safety assist:	15.0	83%

== Awards ==
In 2024, the CX-5 was one of five compact SUVs listed on Car and Driver's Editors' Choice.

== Sales and production ==
Year	Sales												Global production
Year	U.S.	Japan	Europe	Australia	China	Canada	Thailand	Vietnam	South Africa	Mexico	Malaysia (Note: Figures based on registration (Malaysia))	Indonesia	Global production
2012	43,319	35,438	26,664	15,861		11,301				906	1,218	2,841	164,003
2013	79,544	38,520	49,883	20,129	22,549	17,648				10,720	4,106	3,594	253,691
2014	99,122	29,466	57,289	21,571	51,585	19,920	5,634			12,246	5,763	3,659	282,481
2015	111,450	27,243	56,179	25,136	45,110	22,281	3,832			14,782	5,748	2,891	318,912
2016	112,235	21,078	55,345	24,564	49,147	25,123	3,323			11,703	4,925	1,391	313,047
2017	127,563	41,622	59,499	25,831	51,585	25,404	4,835			10,968	4,307	812	335,421
2018	150,622	38,290	69,956	26,173	22,549	26,587	8,184		4,702	11,955	10,759	1,796	392,747
2019	154,545	31,538	64,860	25,539	33,579	27,696	3,020	7,498	4,205	13,742	7,961	1,759	444,262
2020	146,420	24,222	31,703	21,979	33,317	30,583	1,623	11,803	3,154	8,807	7,258	709	361,051
2021	168,448	22,431	28,889	24,968	25,363	26,571	930	10,230	2,901	9,162	6,274	891	381,800
2022	151,594	31,399		27,062	17,358	23,954	824	12,700	2,297	14,605	9,436	1,654	365,135
2023	153,808	25,714		23,083	16,081	22,846	340	16,808	1,369	12,193	4,843	1,640	354,850
2024	134,088	19,418		22,835	31,519	24,644	477	14,781		16,835	6,246	1,322	345,209
2025	136,335	24,520		22,742	23,306	28,288		17,262		14,486	2,815	841	
