= List of Mazda facilities =

Mazda has many production and administrative facilities worldwide.

== Offices ==
- Main office – Aki, Hiroshima, Japan – Established in 1920
- Tokyo office – Chiyoda, Tokyo, Japan
- Osaka office – Kita, Osaka, Japan
- Mazda North American Operations – Irvine, California, USA – Established February 1971
- Mazda Canada – Richmond Hill, Ontario, Canada – Established January 1968
- Mazda Mexico – Santa Fe, Mexico – Established December 2004
- Mazda de Colombia – Bogotá, Colombia – Established May 2014
- Mazda Motor Europe – Leverkusen, Germany
- Mazda Motor Logistics Europe – Willebroek, Belgium
- Mazda Motors UK – Dartford, Kent, UK
- Mazda Automobiles France – St Germain en Laye, France
- Mazda Motors (Deutschland) GmbH - Leverkusen, Germany
- Mazda Suisse – Lancy, Switzerland
- Mazda Austria – Klagenfurt, Austria
- Mazda Automóviles España – Madrid, Spain
- Mazda Motor de Portugal – Lisbon, Portugal
- Mazda Motor Italia – Rome, Italy
- Mazda Motor Beijing – Chaoyang, China
- China FAW Group Corporation:
  - FAW HAIMA Automobile – Haikou, China
  - FAW Car Company – Changchun, China
- Mazda Motor Shanghai – Shanghai, China
- Mazda Motor Taiwan Co., Ltd. – Taipei, Taiwan, Republic of China
- Mazda Australia – Mulgrave, Victoria, Australia
- Mazda Motors of New Zealand – Auckland, New Zealand

== R&D ==
- Hiroshima R&D – Aki, Hiroshima, Japan
- Mazda R&D Center Yokohama – Kanagawa-ku, Yokohama, Kanagawa, Japan – Established June 1987
- Mazda Proving Grounds – listing of current known Mazda Proving facilities

== Production plants ==
The following table summarizes a list of Mazda production plants. The list includes manufacturing and assembly plants wholly owned or wholly operated by Mazda, in addition to joint-venture plants in which Mazda held equity stakes.

The list excludes multi-manufacturer contract assembly plants in which Mazda held no equity stake.

Current Mazda manufacturing, assembly and joint-venture plants
Name	WMI (Note: The first three characters of the vehicle identification number (VIN).)	Plant code (Note: The eleventh character of the vehicle identification number (VIN).)	Location	Commenced production	Notable milestones	Operational scale (Note: Legend Automobile manufacturing: This plant manufactures cars (includes body stamping). The majority of parts and components are sourced locally. This plant is highly automated. Automobile assembly: This plant assembles cars (does not include body stamping). The majority of parts and components are imported or sourced from knock-down (SKD or CKD) kits. This plant is not highly automated.)	Production	Markets served
Hiroshima Plant	JCx; JMx	0	Aki, Hiroshima, Japan	March 1931	1931: Head Office plant opened in Aki district	Automobile, engine, transmission manufacturing	Engines, transmissions	Worldwide
Hiroshima Plant	JCx; JMx	0	Aki, Hiroshima, Japan	March 1931	1964: Ujina Engine plant opened in Ujina district	Automobile, engine, transmission manufacturing	Engines	Worldwide
Hiroshima Plant	JCx; JMx	0	Aki, Hiroshima, Japan	March 1931	1966: Ujina U1 vehicle assembly plant opened in Ujina district	Automobile, engine, transmission manufacturing	CX-30, MX-5	Worldwide
Hiroshima Plant	JCx; JMx	0	Aki, Hiroshima, Japan	March 1931	1972: Ujina U2 vehicle assembly plant opened in Ujina district	Automobile, engine, transmission manufacturing	MX-30	Worldwide
Miyoshi Plant	–		Miyoshi, Hiroshima, Japan	May 1974	–	Engine manufacturing		Worldwide
Hofu Plant	–		Hōfu, Yamaguchi, Japan	September 1982	1981: Nakanoseki plant opened	Transmission manufacturing		Worldwide
Hofu Plant	JCx; JMx	1	Hōfu, Yamaguchi, Japan	September 1982	1982: Nishinoura H1 plant opened	Automobile manufacturing	Mazda2, Mazda3	Worldwide
Hofu Plant	JCx; JMx	1	Hōfu, Yamaguchi, Japan	September 1982	1992: Nishinoura H2 plant opened	Automobile manufacturing	CX-5, CX-60, CX-70, CX-80, CX-90	Worldwide
Rayong Plant; AutoAlliance Thailand (AAT)	MM0, MM6, MM7, MM8	–	Rayong, Thailand	May 1998	1995: AutoAlliance Thailand established as a 50:50 joint venture between Mazda and Ford	Automobile manufacturing	Mazda2, Mazda3, CX-3, CX-30	Worldwide
Nanjing Plant; Changan Mazda Automobile (CMA)	LVR	–	Nanjing, Jiangsu, China	2007	2006: Changan Ford Mazda Automobile established as a 50:35:15 joint venture between Changan, Ford, and Mazda	Automobile manufacturing	Mazda3, CX-30, CX-5, CX-50, EZ-6, EZ-60	Worldwide
Nanjing Plant; Changan Mazda Automobile (CMA)	LVR	–	Nanjing, Jiangsu, China	2007	2007: Production begins at the Nanjing plant	Automobile manufacturing	Mazda3, CX-30, CX-5, CX-50, EZ-6, EZ-60	Worldwide
Nanjing Plant; Changan Mazda Automobile (CMA)	LVR	–	Nanjing, Jiangsu, China	2007	2012: Changan Mazda Automobile established as a 50:50 joint venture between Mazda and Changan	Automobile manufacturing	Mazda3, CX-30, CX-5, CX-50, EZ-6, EZ-60	Worldwide
Nanjing Plant; Changan Mazda Automobile (CMA)	LVR	–	Nanjing, Jiangsu, China	2007	2021: Changan Mazda restructured so that Mazda & Changan now each hold 47.5% while FAW now holds 5%. FAW's 60% stake in FAW Mazda Motor Sales Co., Ltd. (FMSC) is now owned by Changan Mazda Automobile	Automobile manufacturing	Mazda3, CX-30, CX-5, CX-50, EZ-6, EZ-60	Worldwide
Nanjing Engine Plant; Changan Mazda Engine Co. (CME)	–		Nanjing, Jiangsu, China	2007	2005: Changan Ford Mazda Engine established as a 50:25:25 joint venture between Changan, Ford, and Mazda	Engine manufacturing		Worldwide
Nanjing Engine Plant; Changan Mazda Engine Co. (CME)	–		Nanjing, Jiangsu, China	2007	2007: Production begins at the Nanjing engine plant	Engine manufacturing		Worldwide
Nanjing Engine Plant; Changan Mazda Engine Co. (CME)	–		Nanjing, Jiangsu, China	2007	2019: Changan Mazda Engine established as a 50:50 joint venture between Mazda and Changan when Mazda buys out Ford's stake in the JV	Engine manufacturing		Worldwide
Nui Thanh Plant; Vina Mazda Automobile Manufacturing (VMAM)	–		Núi Thành, Vietnam	2011	2011: Vina Mazda Automobile Manufacturing established as a non-Mazda subsidiary	Automobile assembly	Mazda3, CX-5, CX-8	Vietnam
Kulim Plant; Mazda Malaysia Sdn. Bhd. (MMSB)	PP1	–	Kulim, Malaysia	2011	2011: Inokom commenced contract assembly for Mazda	Automobile assembly	CX-30, CX-5, CX-8	Southeast Asia
Kulim Plant; Mazda Malaysia Sdn. Bhd. (MMSB)	PP1	–	Kulim, Malaysia	2011	2012: Mazda Malaysia established as a 70:30 joint venture between Mazda and Bermaz	Automobile assembly	CX-30, CX-5, CX-8	Southeast Asia
Kulim Plant; Mazda Malaysia Sdn. Bhd. (MMSB)	PP1	–	Kulim, Malaysia	2011	2014: Mazda-exclusive assembly plant was built within Inokom complex	Automobile assembly	CX-30, CX-5, CX-8	Southeast Asia
Salamanca Plant; Mazda de Mexico Vehicle Operation (MMVO)	3MD (Mazda2) 3MV (CX-30) 3MZ (Mazda3) 3MY (Toyota)	M (Mazda) Y (Toyota)	Salamanca, Guanajuato, Mexico	January 2014	2011: Mazda de Mexico Vehicle Operation established as a 75:25 joint venture between Mazda and Sumitomo	Automobile, engine manufacturing	Mazda2, Mazda3, CX-3, CX-30	North America, South America, Europe
Salamanca Plant; Mazda de Mexico Vehicle Operation (MMVO)	3MD (Mazda2) 3MV (CX-30) 3MZ (Mazda3) 3MY (Toyota)	M (Mazda) Y (Toyota)	Salamanca, Guanajuato, Mexico	January 2014	2014: Production commenced (first with Mazda3 followed by Mazda2 hatchback). Engine machining plant opened	Automobile, engine manufacturing	Mazda2, Mazda3, CX-3, CX-30	North America, South America, Europe
Salamanca Plant; Mazda de Mexico Vehicle Operation (MMVO)	3MD (Mazda2) 3MV (CX-30) 3MZ (Mazda3) 3MY (Toyota)	M (Mazda) Y (Toyota)	Salamanca, Guanajuato, Mexico	January 2014	2015: Engine production begins (SKYACTIV-G 1.5, SKYACTIV-G 2.0, SKYACTIV-D 1.5). Production for Toyota begins	Automobile, engine manufacturing	Mazda2, Mazda3, CX-3, CX-30	North America, South America, Europe
Salamanca Plant; Mazda de Mexico Vehicle Operation (MMVO)	3MD (Mazda2) 3MV (CX-30) 3MZ (Mazda3) 3MY (Toyota)	M (Mazda) Y (Toyota)	Salamanca, Guanajuato, Mexico	January 2014	2017: SKYACTIV-G 2.5 engine production begins	Automobile, engine manufacturing	Mazda2, Mazda3, CX-3, CX-30	North America, South America, Europe
Salamanca Plant; Mazda de Mexico Vehicle Operation (MMVO)	3MD (Mazda2) 3MV (CX-30) 3MZ (Mazda3) 3MY (Toyota)	M (Mazda) Y (Toyota)	Salamanca, Guanajuato, Mexico	January 2014	2018: Mazda2 sedan production begins	Automobile, engine manufacturing	Mazda2, Mazda3, CX-3, CX-30	North America, South America, Europe
Salamanca Plant; Mazda de Mexico Vehicle Operation (MMVO)	3MD (Mazda2) 3MV (CX-30) 3MZ (Mazda3) 3MY (Toyota)	M (Mazda) Y (Toyota)	Salamanca, Guanajuato, Mexico	January 2014	2019: CX-30 production begins	Automobile, engine manufacturing	Mazda2, Mazda3, CX-3, CX-30	North America, South America, Europe
Salamanca Plant; Mazda de Mexico Vehicle Operation (MMVO)	3MD (Mazda2) 3MV (CX-30) 3MZ (Mazda3) 3MY (Toyota)	M (Mazda) Y (Toyota)	Salamanca, Guanajuato, Mexico	January 2014	2020: Mazda buys out Sumitomo and takes 100% ownership of Mazda de Mexico. Production for Toyota ends	Automobile, engine manufacturing	Mazda2, Mazda3, CX-3, CX-30	North America, South America, Europe
Salamanca Plant; Mazda de Mexico Vehicle Operation (MMVO)	3MD (Mazda2) 3MV (CX-30) 3MZ (Mazda3) 3MY (Toyota)	M (Mazda) Y (Toyota)	Salamanca, Guanajuato, Mexico	January 2014	2022: CX-3 production begins	Automobile, engine manufacturing	Mazda2, Mazda3, CX-3, CX-30	North America, South America, Europe
Chonburi Plant; Mazda Powertrain Manufacturing (Thailand) (MPMT)	–		Si Racha, Chonburi, Thailand	January 2015	2013: Mazda Powertrain Manufacturing (Thailand) established as a wholly owned subsidiary of Mazda	Engine, transmission manufacturing		Worldwide
Chonburi Plant; Mazda Powertrain Manufacturing (Thailand) (MPMT)	–		Si Racha, Chonburi, Thailand	January 2015	2018: Engine machining plant opened	Engine, transmission manufacturing		Worldwide
Alabama Plant; Mazda Toyota Manufacturing USA (MTMUS)	7MM (Mazda vehicles)	N (Mazda vehicles)	Huntsville, Alabama, United States	January 2022	2018: Mazda announces plans for a new American plant, built under a joint venture with Toyota	Automobile manufacturing	CX-50	North America
Alabama Plant; Mazda Toyota Manufacturing USA (MTMUS)	7MM (Mazda vehicles)	N (Mazda vehicles)	Huntsville, Alabama, United States	January 2022	2022: Production for Mazda begins with CX-50	Automobile manufacturing	CX-50	North America
Indonesia Plant; Eurokars Produksi Pratama (EPP)	–		Bogor, West Java, Indonesia	2026	2024: Eurokars Produksi Pratama established as a non-Mazda subsidiary	Automobile assembly	CX-30	Indonesia

Former Mazda manufacturing, assembly and joint-venture plants
Name	WMI	Plant code	Location	Years of operation	Notable milestones	Operational scale	Production	Markets served
Bogotá Plant; Compañía Colombiana Automotriz (CCA)	9FC	—N/a	Bogotá, Colombia	1983–2014	1982: Mazda purchased Compañía Colombiana Automotriz from Fiat; 1983: Mazda production commenced; 2014: Mazda production ceased	Automobile assembly		South America
Michigan Plant; Mazda Motor Manufacturing USA (MMM USA) AutoAlliance International (AAI)	1YV (Mazda vehicles)	5	Flat Rock, Michigan, United States	1987–1992 (MMM USA) 1992–2012 (AAI)	1987: Mazda Motor Manufacturing USA (MMM USA) established as a wholly owned subsidiary of Mazda. Mazda production commenced; 1992: Ford purchased a 50% stake in MMM USA. Renamed AutoAlliance International (AAI); 2012: Mazda production ceased. Ford purchased Mazda's 50% stake in AAI. AAI was renamed Flat Rock Assembly Plant	Automobile manufacturing		North America
Vladivostok Plant; Mazda Sollers Manufacturing Rus (MSMR)	—N/a		Vladivostok, Russia	2012–2022	2011: Mazda Sollers Manufacturing Rus established as a 50:50 joint venture between Mazda and Sollers; 2012: Production commenced; 2022: Production suspended due to Russian invasion of Ukraine. Sollers is buying back Mazda's 50% stake in the joint venture	Automobile assembly		Russia

== Other assembly locations ==
=== Active ===
- Astra Daihatsu Motor – Sunter, Jakarta, Indonesia
- Daihatsu Motor Co., Ltd. – Ōyamazaki, Kyoto, Japan
- FAW Group – Changchun, Jilin, China
- Isuzu – Fujisawa, Japan
- Isuzu Motors (Thailand) – Samut Prakan, Thailand
- Kenyan Vehicle Manufacturing – Thika, Kenya
- Suzuki Motor Corporation – Kosai, Shizuoka, Japan
- Suzuki Motor Corporation – Iwata, Shizuoka, Japan
- Toyota Motor Manufacturing France – Onnaing, France
- Toyota Auto Body – Inabe, Mie Prefecture, Japan
- Mazda Toyota Manufacturing USA Huntsville, Alabama

=== Defunct ===
- Asia Automobile Industries (AAI) – Petaling Jaya, Selangor, Malaysia
- Associated Motors Industries (Malaysia) – Batu Tiga, Selangor, Malaysia Ceased operations in 2008.
- Changan Ford Mazda – Chongqing, China
- Columbian Autocar Corporation – Parañaque, Philippines
- Ford Edison Assembly Plant – Edison, New Jersey, USA (closed in 2004)
- Ford Kansas City Assembly Plant – Kansas City, Missouri, USA
- Ford Louisville Assembly Plant – Louisville, Kentucky, USA
- Ford Twin Cities Assembly Plant – St. Paul, Minnesota, USA (closed in 2011)
- Ford Dagenham – Dagenham, England, U.K.
- Ford Lio Ho Motor – Zhongli District, Taoyuan City, Taiwan
- Ford Motor Company Philippines – Santa Rosa, Laguna, Philippines Closed in 2012
- Ford Valencia Assembly – Valencia, Carabobo, Venezuela
- Ford Valencia Body and Assembly – Almussafes, Valencian Community, Spain
- MARESA – Quito, Ecuador Ceased operations in 2015.
- Motor Holdings – Ōtāhuhu, New Zealand
- National Assemblers – Jakarta, Indonesia
- Nissan – Oppama plant, Yokosuka, Kanagawa, Japan
- Nissan Shatai – Shonan plant, Hiratsuka, Kanagawa, Japan
- Nissan Shatai – Kyoto, Kyoto Prefecture, Japan
- Sigma Motor Corporation & Samcor & Ford Motor Company of Southern Africa – Silverton, Pretoria, South Africa Mazda production ended in 2015-2016 fiscal year.
- Steel Motor Assemblies Ltd. – Christchurch, New Zealand
- Suzuki Indomobil Motor – Bekasi Regency, West Java, Indonesia
- Swaraj Mazda – Punjab, India. Closed in 2011
- Willowvale Mazda Motor Industries (WMMI) – Harare, Zimbabwe -mothballed since 2012 when operations became unprofitable due to the local political conditions
- Vehicles Assemblers of New Zealand (VANZ) – Wiri, New Zealand
- Vietnam Motors – Hanoi, Vietnam. Not currently producing cars, makes truck and buses.
- Bahman Group – Tehran, Iran Production seems to have ended by 2018
