= Mazda CX-50 =

Compact crossover SUV

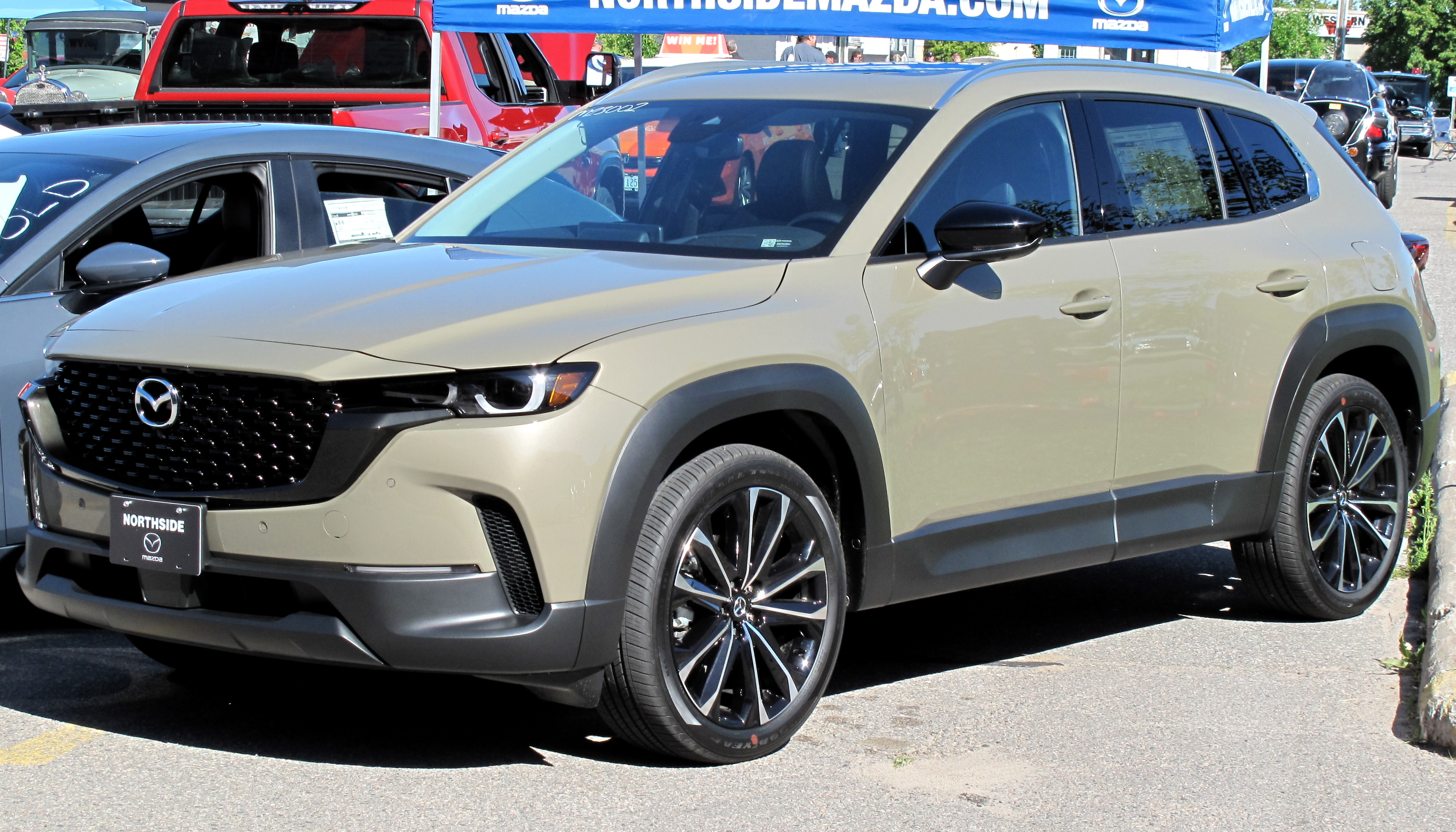
- 2023 Mazda CX-50 GT (Canada)

Overview
- Manufacturer: Mazda
- Model code: VA
- Production: January 2022 – present
- Model years: 2023–present
- Assembly: United States: Huntsville, Alabama (MTMUS); China: Nanjing (Changan Mazda)
- Designer: Eiji Kimoto, Takeshi Shinohara, Kouhei Kawakami, Young-Joon Suh, Ryousuke Nozaki, Yutaka Sukegawa, Heitetsu Takemoto, and Yasuyuki Murata

Body and chassis
- Class: Compact crossover SUV
- Body style: 5-door SUV
- Layout: Front-engine, all-wheel-drive
- Platform: Small Product Group
- Related: Mazda CX-5 (KM); Mazda3 (BP); Mazda CX-30

Powertrain
- Engine: Gasoline: 2.0 L Skyactiv-G PE-VPS I4 (China); 2.5 L Skyactiv-G PY-VPS I4; 2.5 L Skyactiv-G PY-VPTS turbo I4; Gasoline hybrid: 2.5 L Toyota A25A-FXS I4; 2.5 L Toyota A25D-FXS I4 (China)
- Power output: PE-VPS: 153 hp (155 PS); PY-VPS: 187 hp (190 PS); PY-VPTS: 227–256 hp (230–260 PS); HEV: 176 hp (178 PS)
- Transmission: 6-speed Skyactiv-Drive automatic; eCVT (HEV)

Dimensions
- Wheelbase: 110.8 in (2,814 mm)
- Length: 185.8 in (4,719 mm); 188.4 in (4,785 mm) (China)
- Width: 75.6 in (1,920 mm)
- Height: 63.5–63.9 in (1,613–1,623 mm)
- Curb weight: 3,706–3,907 lb (1,681–1,772 kg)

The Mazda CX-50 is a compact crossover SUV produced by the Japanese automobile manufacturer Mazda since 2022 for the 2023 model year, for the North American and Chinese markets. Based on the same transverse, front-wheel-drive platform as the fourth-generation Mazda3 and the CX-30, the vehicle is sold alongside the slightly smaller CX-5 and is positioned below the larger, rear-wheel-drive based CX-70.

== Design ==
The CX-50 was officially revealed on November 15, 2021 in the US market. Compared to the smaller CX-5, the vehicle is designed with emphasis in "active and outdoor lifestyles", by introducing squarer styling and larger body cladding. A more rugged off-road-styled variant named the Meridian Edition is also available. Mazda's i-Activ all-wheel drive technology and Mazda Intelligent Drive Select (Mi-Drive) are standard in the CX-50.

Compared to the CX-5, Mazda designed a lower roof for the CX-50 to grant easier access to the roof racks, despite the increased ground clearance. It is also the first Mazda ever to feature a panoramic sunroof as an option.

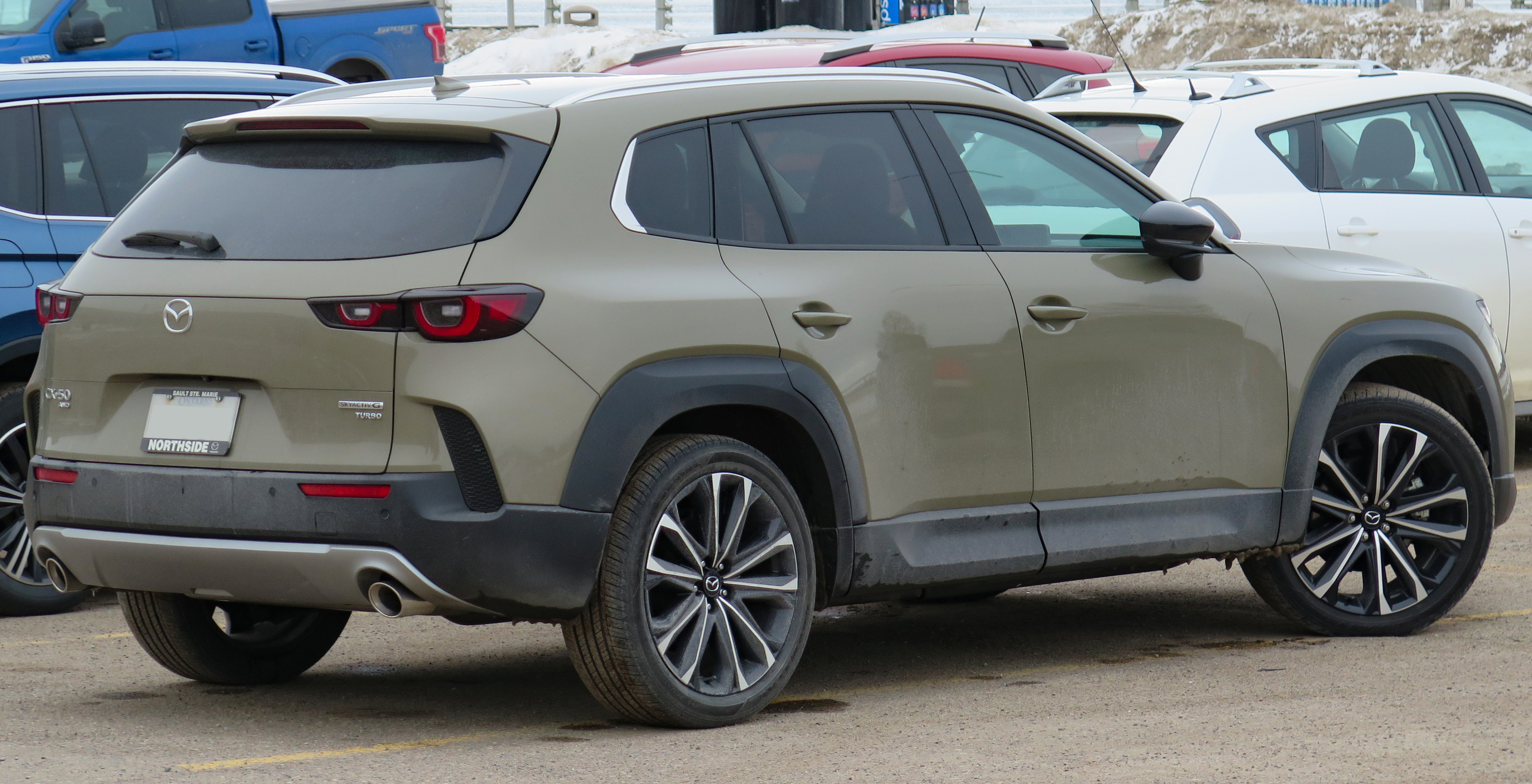
Rear view of CX-50 GT (Canada)

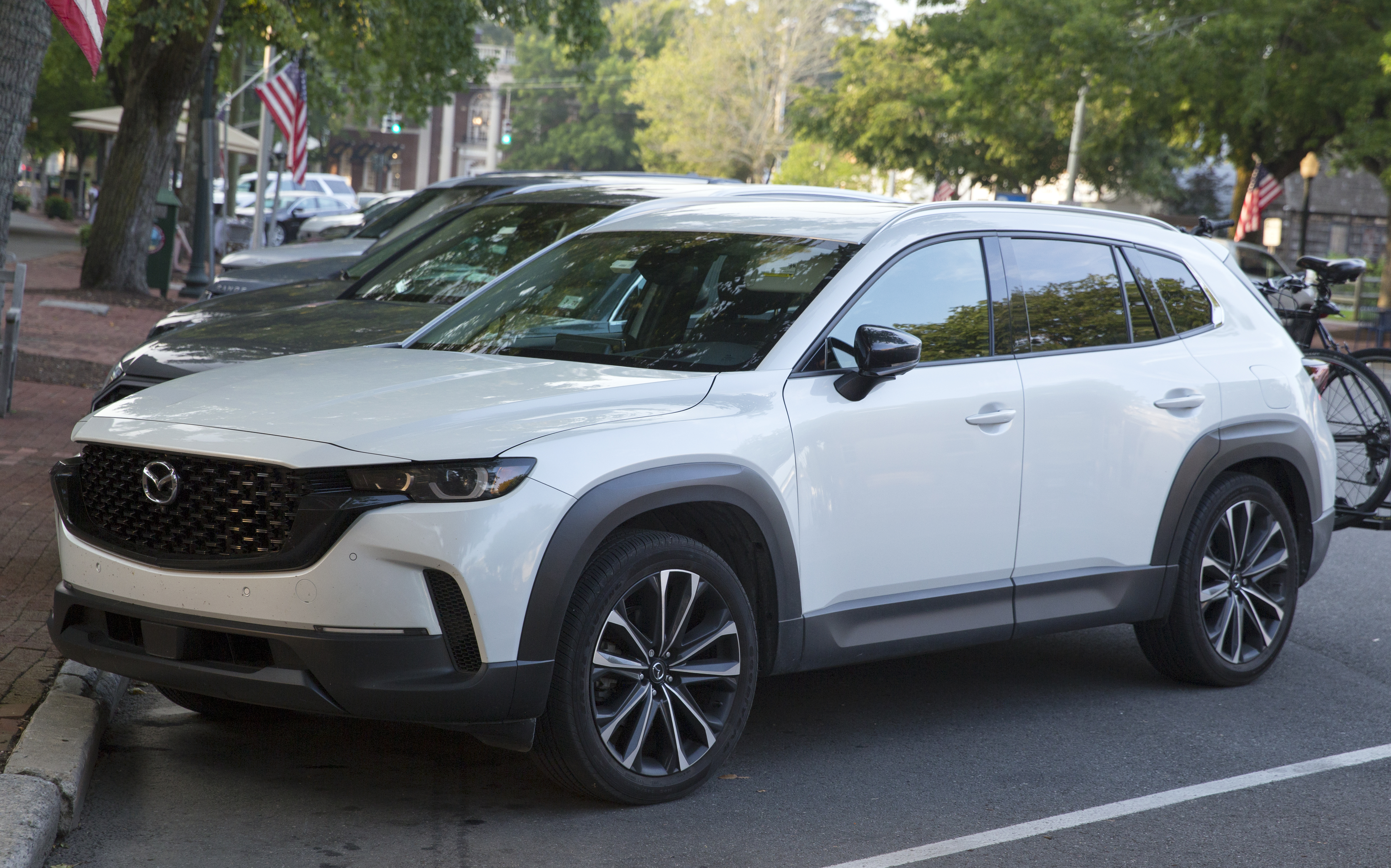
CX-50 Premium (front view; US)

== Production and markets ==
The CX-50 began production at the Mazda Toyota Manufacturing USA plant in Huntsville, Alabama, United States alongside the unrelated Toyota Corolla Cross on January 26, 2022, marking Mazda's return to production in the United States after 10 years when American assembly of the Mazda6 sedan ceased in 2012.

In international markets, the CX-50 is also marketed in Colombia since December 2022 and Mexico since March 2023. It is also produced and marketed in China by Changan Mazda, where production started since March 2023. The Chinese model is slightly modified with a longer rear bumper, and a 55 millimetres (2.2 in) larger rear legroom.

The CX-50 was initially introduced to the Canadian market for the 2023 model year, followed by the CX-50 Hybrid for the 2025 model year, with all units imported from the Mazda Toyota Manufacturing plant in Huntsville, Alabama. However, following a March 2025 cross-border trade dispute that resulted in Canada enacting a retaliatory 25% surtax on non-CUSMA-compliant, U.S.-assembled passenger vehicles, Mazda Canada officially suspended all factory imports of the vehicle effective May 12, 2025. Because the CX-50 relied heavily on international components and fell below the strict 75% Regional Value Content threshold required for free trade exemptions, Mazda reallocated 100% of the Alabama plant's Canadian production volume to the United States domestic market, leaving the vehicle effectively withdrawn from the Canadian market once remaining dealer inventory was depleted.

== Powertrain ==
The CX-50 is powered by the 2.5-litre Skyactiv-G inline-four engine offered in its standard naturally-aspirated (PY-VPS) form, which produces 187 horsepower (190 PS) and 186 pound-feet (252 N⋅m; 26 kg⋅m) of torque, and a turbocharged (PY-VPTS) variant that outputs 227 horsepower (230 PS) (with 87 AKI octane fuel) or 256 horsepower (260 PS) (with 93 AKI octane fuel) and 320 pound-feet (434 N⋅m; 44 kg⋅m) of torque.

In November 2023, the CX-50 HEV went on sale in China. It is powered by a 2.5-litre A25D-FXS engine and the Toyota Hybrid System, paired with an eCVT gearbox.

== Trim levels ==
The CX-50 in the United States is available in Select, Preferred, Preferred Plus, Premium, and Premium Plus trims. The turbocharged engine option is reserved for Base (Turbo), Premium, and Premium Plus trims. In addition, Mazda also offers a more rugged "Meridian Edition" trim for the turbocharged model, which adds 18-inch wheels with all-terrain tires, side rocker garnish, model-specific front hood graphics, and other outdoor-oriented accessories.

The CX-50 was updated on July 9, 2024 for the 2025 model year in the United States. The hybrid powertrain option became available for the Preferred, Premium and Premium Plus trims, while the base Turbo trim is no longer offered.

== Safety ==
The 2023 CX-50 was awarded the "Top Safety Pick +" by the Insurance Institute for Highway Safety. It received overall Good and Superior ratings on all categories except the non-turbo models, which received an Acceptable rating on headlights, as only the turbo models are offered with adaptive headlights.

IIHS scores
| Small overlap front (Driver) | Good |
| Small overlap front (Passenger) | Good |
| Moderate overlap front | Good |
| Side (original test) | Good |
| Roof strength | Good |
| Head restraints and seats | Good |
| Headlights (all turbo trims) | Good |
| Headlights (all non-turbo trims) | Acceptable |
| Front crash prevention (Vehicle-to-Vehicle) | Superior |
| Front crash prevention (Vehicle-to-Pedestrian, day) | Superior |
| Child seat anchors (LATCH) ease of use | Good+ |

== Awards ==
In 2024, the CX-50 was one of five compact SUVs listed on Car and Driver's Editors' Choice.

== Sales ==
| Calendar year | U.S. | Canada | Mexico | China |
|---|---|---|---|---|
| 2022 | 21,329 | 2,365 | | |
| 2023 | 44,595 | 5,711 | 1,901 | 8,754 |
| 2024 | 81,441 | 10,759 | | 7,668 |
| 2025 | 110,345 | 8,044 | | 3,952 |
