= Mazda Proving Grounds =

Mazda uses a number of different Proving Grounds to test their vehicles.

== Miyoshi Proving Ground – Hiroshima, Japan ==
Miyoshi Proving Ground is Mazda's primary testing facility, located in Miyoshi, Hiroshima, Japan and is owned by the company. The facility covers 1,667,000 square metres (412 acres) of land and opened in June, 1965. Facilities include a banked high speed test track, wind tunnel, crash test facility, and durability testing. In addition, a diesel engine assembly plant is located on the site.

Latitude and Longitude: 34°47′52″N 132°52′1″E

== Mine Proving Grounds (MPG) – Nagao, Japan ==
The site was acquired by Mazda Corporation from CQ Motors Corporation, Tokyo in February–March 2006, after the previous company withdrew from the racing circuit business. The current setup includes: a 3.3-kilometre (2.1 mi) circuit course, control tower, gymkhana space, pit area, paddocks, and viewing stands. Mazda added high speed straights for slalom performance testing, a European style mid-range handling road and a high speed hillclimb/low friction road for brake system assessment.

Gross Area: 601,683 square metres (149 acres). Total floor area: 6,128 square metres (65,961 sq ft) (includes all office buildings and other equipment on the land).

Location: 1173-1 Nagao, Nishiatsu-cho, Mine City, Yamaguchi Prefecture. Latitude and Longitude: 34°8′35″N 131°6′18″E

== Kenbuchi Proving Ground – Kamikawa, Hokkaido, Japan ==
Kenbuchi Proving Ground is an automobile testing facility in Kamikawa, Hokkaido, Japan owned by Mazda Motor Corporation. The facility is primarily used for cold-weather testing including systems such as AWD, ABS, TCS, and DSC. The facility was established in January 1990. It includes 4,700,000 square metres (1,161 acres) of land.

Latitude and Longitude: 44.12915°N 142.28787°E

== Nakasatsunai Proving Ground – Kasai, Hokkaido, Japan ==
Nakasatsunai Proving Ground is an automobile testing facility in Kasai, Hokkaido, Japan owned by Mazda Motor Corporation. The facility, opened in January 2002, is primarily used for cold-weather testing. It includes 260,000 square metres (64 acres) of land.

Latitude and Longitude: 42.6540°N 142.9946°E

== Arizona Proving Grounds - Wittmann, Arizona, USA ==
Mazda uses Ford's Arizona Proving Grounds in Wittmann, Arizona, United States on a contract basis for hot weather durability testing, sun exposure testing, climate control validation, and dust intrusion testing.

Latitude and Longitude: 33.7943°N 112.4993°W

== See also ==
- List of Mazda facilities
