= Mazda Toyota Manufacturing USA =

Automobile plant in Huntsville, Alabama, US

Coordinates: 34.682°N 86.846°W

Mazda Toyota Manufacturing, U.S.A., Inc.
- Industry: Automotive
- Founded: September 30, 2021; 5 years ago
- Headquarters: 9000 Greenbrier Pkwy NW, Madison, Alabama, United States
- Key people: Mitsunobu Mukaida
- Products: Mazda CX-50; Toyota Corolla Cross
- Owner: Mazda (50%); Toyota (50%)
- Number of employees: 4,000
- Website: mazdatoyota.com

Mazda Toyota Manufacturing USA (MTMUS) is an automobile manufacturing plant in Madison, Alabama, United States. It is operated as a joint venture between Japanese automakers Mazda and Toyota. The facility marks Mazda's return to U.S. production after the company ended operations at the Flat Rock Assembly Plant in 2012.

The project was announced on January 10, 2018, with an initial investment of US$1.6 billion, later increased to US$2.3 billion. Construction began on a Tennessee Valley Authority-certified megasite in Limestone County on November 16, 2018. At full capacity, the facility is expected to employ 4,000 people and produce up to 300,000 vehicles annually.

Production began on September 30, 2021, with the Toyota Corolla Cross compact crossover SUV assembled on the "Apollo" line. Production of the Mazda CX-50 began on January 26, 2022, on the "Discovery" line.

== Products ==
- Toyota Corolla Cross (2021–present) — Apollo line
- Mazda CX-50 (2022–present) — Discovery line

== See also ==
- List of Mazda facilities
- List of Toyota factories
- Toyota Motor Manufacturing Alabama – engine plant located in nearby Huntsville, Alabama
