= Miyoshi (Mazda factory) =

Factory complex in Hiroshima Prefecture, Japan

Miyoshi Plant is an automobile engine manufacturing complex in Miyoshi, Hiroshima, Japan, operated by Mazda. The complex produces piston engines and opened in May, 1974. It includes 1,670,000 square meters (18,000,000 ft^{2}) of space. The plant builds Mazda's F and J engines.

== See also ==
- List of Mazda facilities
