= Mazda Capella =

Mid-size car manufactured by Mazda (1970–2002)

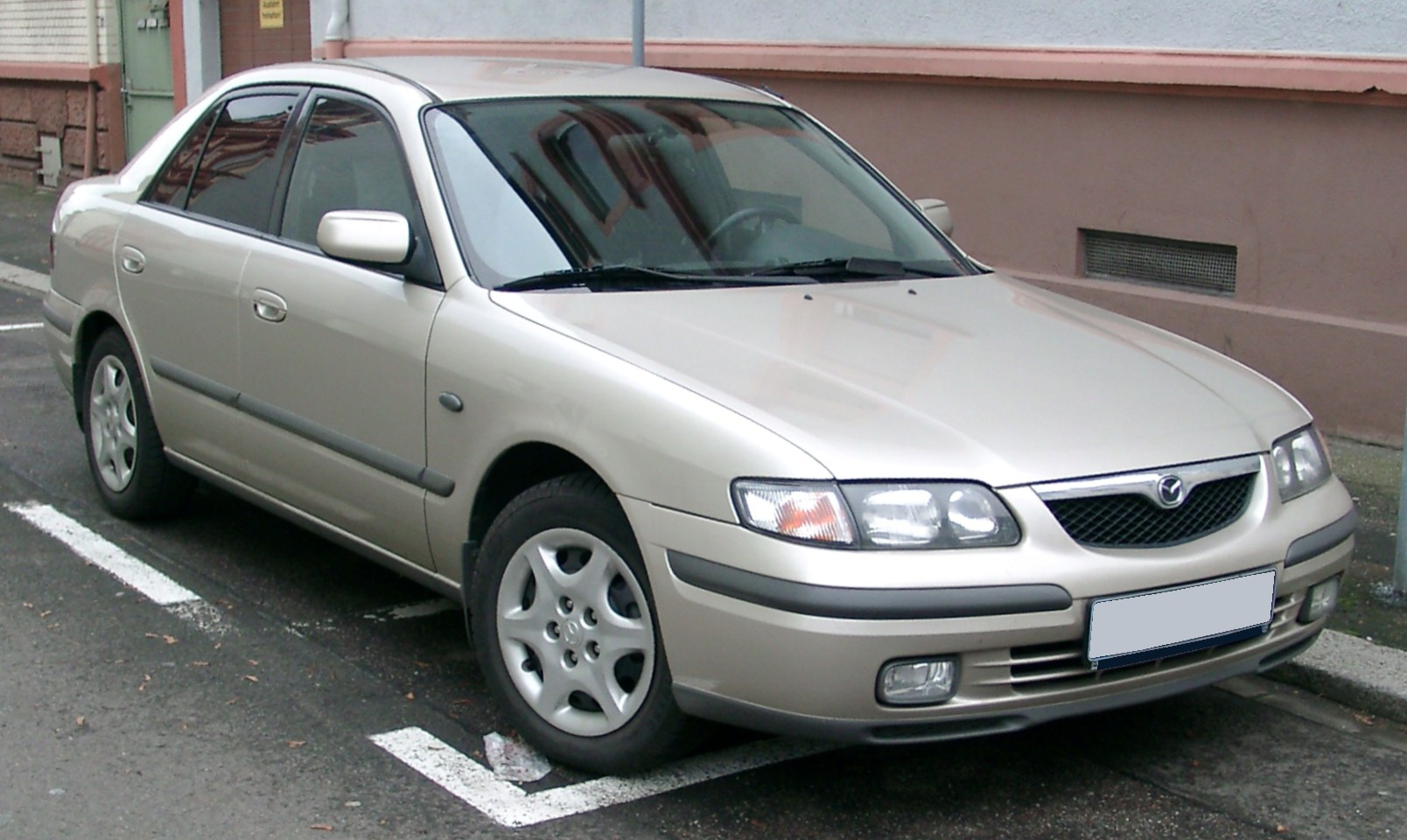
- Sixth-generation Mazda 626 sedan

Overview
- Manufacturer: Mazda
- Production: 1970–2002

Body and chassis
- Class: Compact (1970–1987); Mid-size (1987–2002)
- Layout: FR layout (1970–1982); FF layout (1983–2005); 4WD layout (1991–2005)

Chronology
- Successor: Mazda Atenza/Mazda6

The Mazda Capella, also known as the Mazda 626 in Europe, North America and Southeast Asia, is a mid-size car that was manufactured by Mazda from 1970 until 2002. Ford, Mazda's partner at the time, also used the Capella platform to create the Ford Telstar and Ford Probe. 4,345,279 of the 626 and Telstar models were sold worldwide.

Designed to compete against Japanese mid-size stalwarts such as the Honda Accord, Toyota Corona, and Nissan Bluebird, the Capella was succeeded by the Mazda6 (Atenza) in 2002.

The car was named after Capella, the brightest star in the constellation Auriga, the sixth-brightest in the night sky and the third-brightest in the northern celestial hemisphere, after Arcturus and Vega.

== First generation (1970–1978) ==
SNA, S122A, CB12, CB1V
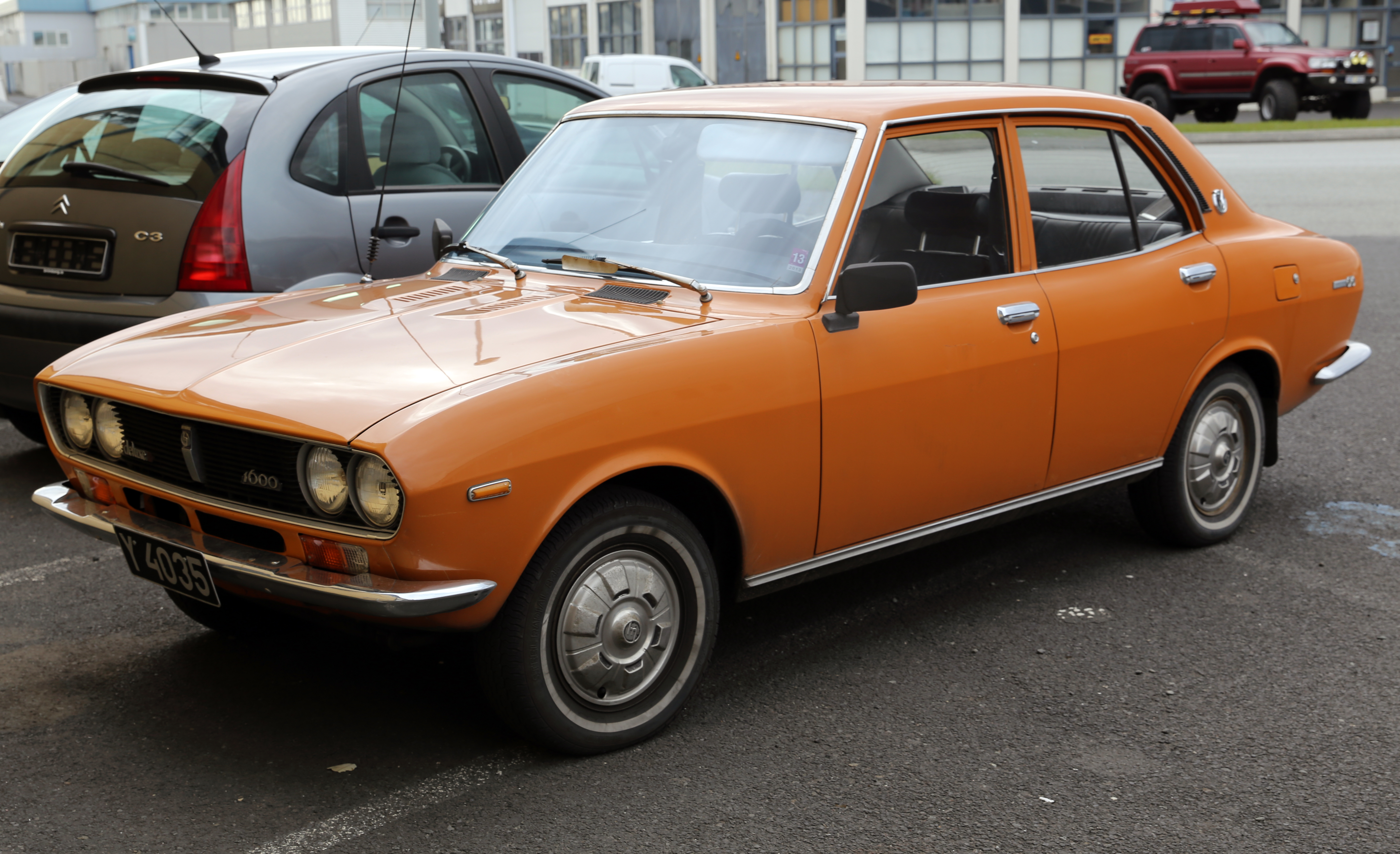
- First-facelift Mazda 616 sedan (Europe), 1973–1974

Overview
- Also called: Mazda 616/618; Mazda RX-2
- Production: 1970–1978
- Assembly: Japan: Hiroshima; South Africa: Durban; Indonesia

Body and chassis
- Body style: 2-door coupé 4-door sedan
- Layout: Longitudinal front-engine, rear-wheel drive

Powertrain
- Engine: 1490 cc UB I4 (SU2A); 1586 cc NA I4 (SNA); 1769 cc VC I4 (CB1V); 1796 cc VB I4 (USA only); 1146 cc Wankel 12A rotary (S122A); 1146 cc Wankel 12B rotary (CB12)
- Transmission: 4/5-speed manual 3-speed automatic

Dimensions
- Wheelbase: 2,470 mm (97.2 in)
- Length: 4,150 mm (163.4 in) (1970–1974); 4,260 mm (167.7 in) (1974–1978)
- Width: 1,580 mm (62.2 in)
- Height: 1,375–1,430 mm (54.1–56.3 in)

The first Capella was introduced in May 1970 and lasted until 1978, and was introduced as an intermediate alternative to the smaller Mazda Familia and the larger Mazda Luce. It was powered by four-cylinder SOHC valve engines displacing either 1.5 or 1.6 litres. Output is 92 or 100 PS (68 or 74 kW), respectively; and 144 N⋅m (106 lb⋅ft) of torque for the larger displacement version. The first models all had rectangular headlights, while the rotary-engined models received round twin headlamps beginning in October 1971. From 1972 all models received the double headlamps. The taillight design was changed repeatedly over the production run. This generation was sold in export markets as the Mazda 616 in sedan and, for some markets, coupé configurations. There was also a Mazda 618 briefly sold in the United States.

An optional Mazda Wankel engine was offered and known as the Capella Rotary in Japan or the Mazda RX-2 for export. In addition to the 1.6, a Capella 1500 was added in October 1970. The Capella received a fairly thorough facelift in February 1974. This facelift included a restyled front end (lengthened by 110 mm) and a redesigned dashboard. This model received an optional 1.8-litre (1769 cc) engine for some markets and in Japan it was sold with the "AP" suffix, for "Anti-Pollution". The 1500 was no longer available. The facelift rotary version received the CB12S chassis code rather than S122A.

In Japan, the installation of a rotary engine gave Japanese buyers a financial advantage when it came time to pay the annual road tax in that they bought a car that was more powerful than a traditional inline engine, but without having the penalty for having an engine in the higher 1.5-litre tax bracket. This was the only generation that had the rotary engine offered.

The RX-2 was assembled under contract in New Zealand from 1972 for Mazda New Zealand by Motor Industries International in Otahuhu, South Auckland. It was the first and only rotary-engined car ever to be assembled in the country and was made as both a sedan, with manual or automatic transmission and a manual-only coupé. The 616 was also built but was much less popular. In South Africa, where the Capella was assembled first by Illings and then by Sigma, it was available with the 1600 or 1800 reciprocal engines as well as the rotary. The rotary claimed 97 kW (132 PS; 130 hp) SAE in South Africa. The facelift version arrived two years late there, in mid-1976. At the end of that year, the Capella RS was introduced—this lowered version with Rostyle wheels was limited to 20 cars per month. South African production of the Capella Rotary continued into 1979, since Sigma had taken the decision not to build the second-generation Capella there but to focus on the Colt Galant instead.

The Mazda 616 was a major component of Mazda's United States expansion in 1971, having been preceded by its rotary brother, the RX-2, the previous year. It featured the 1.6-litre (1586 cc) engine, which was later used in the 808. The American Capella was updated and renamed the next year: the 1972 Mazda 618 had a larger 1.8-litre (1796 cc) VB engine which was only used in the US and not related to the similarly sized "VC" used in the rest of the world. Lasting just one year, the 618 nameplate was not used again in the United States and the only federalized version of the Capella for 1973 was the RX-2.

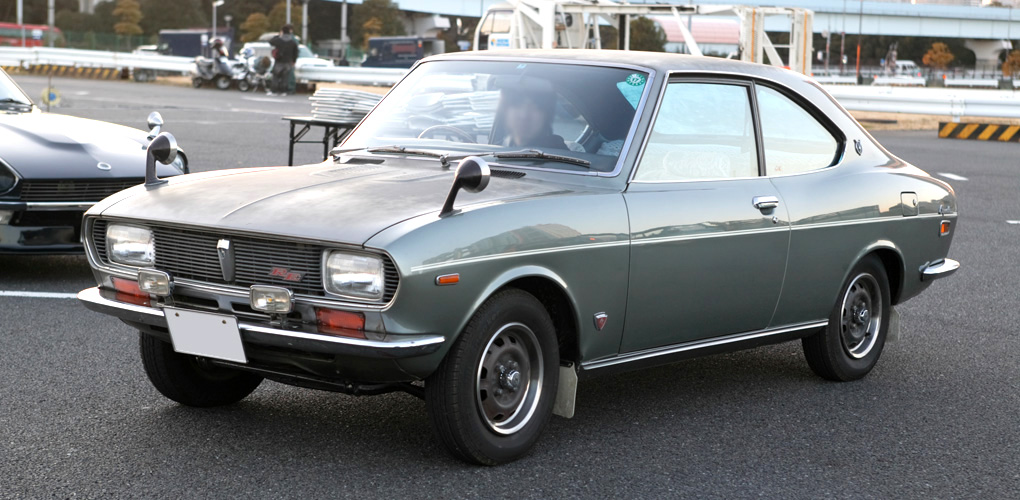
Pre-facelift Mazda Capella Rotary coupe (Japan), 1970–1971

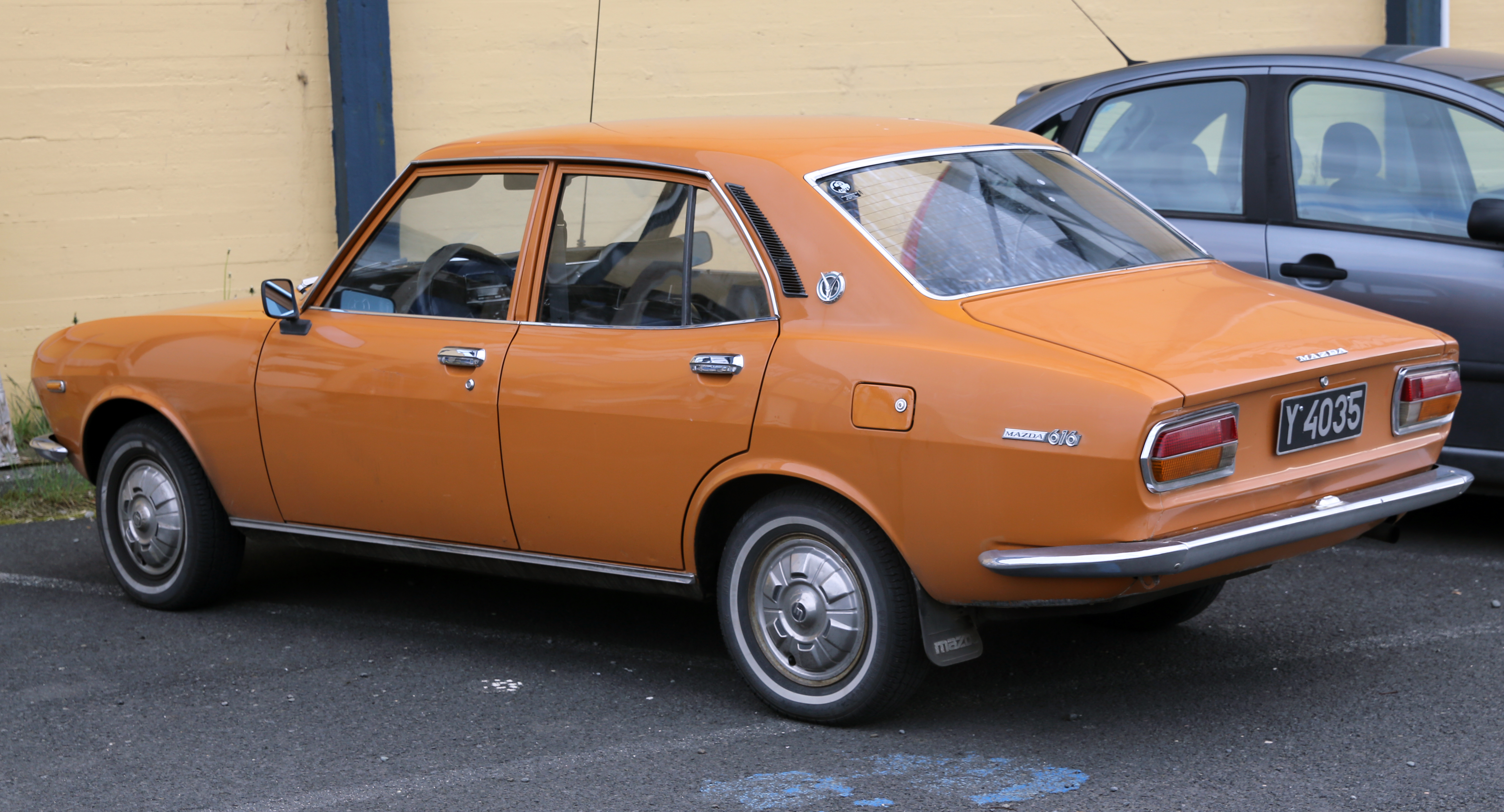
First-facelift Mazda 616 sedan (Europe), 1973–1974

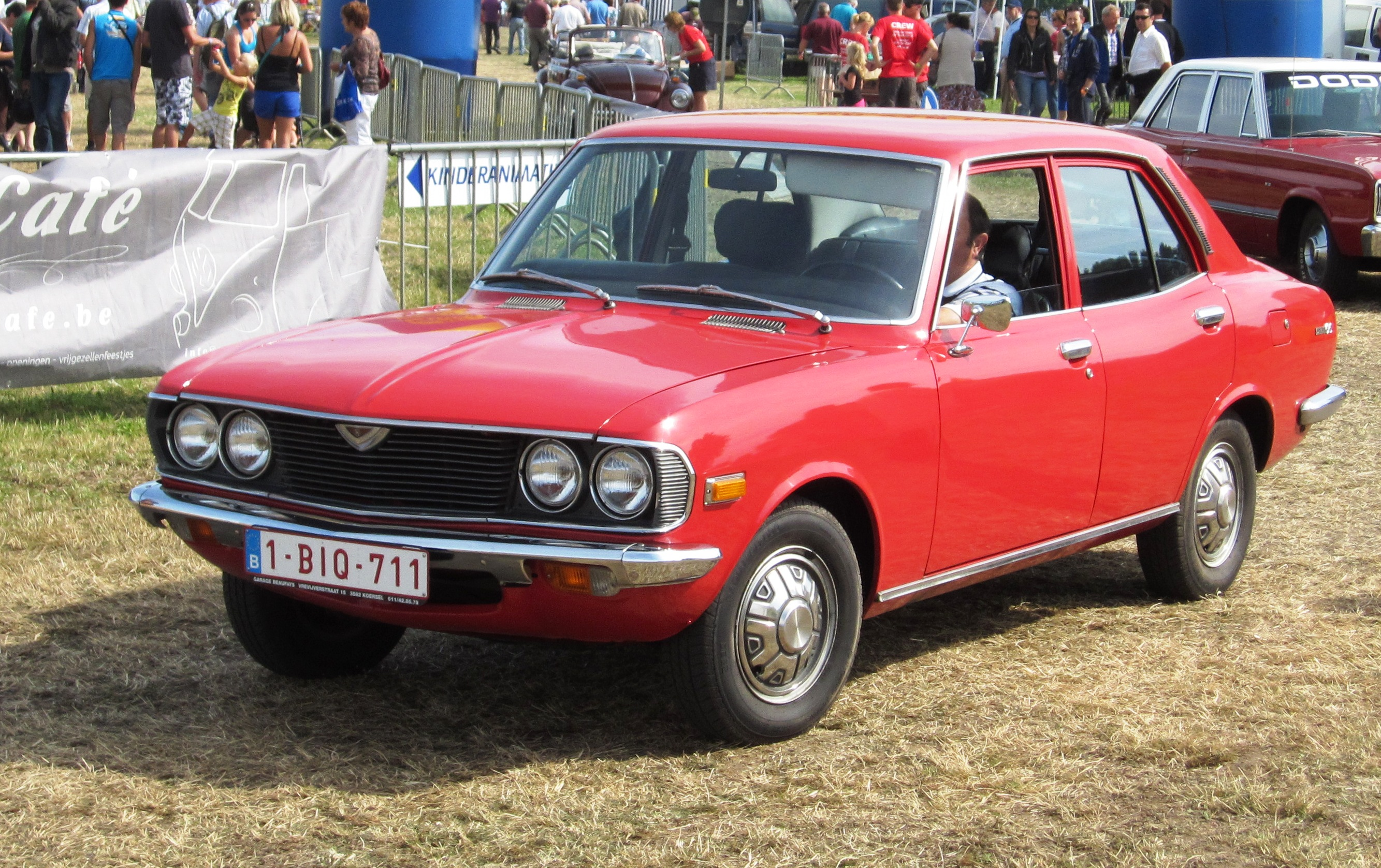
Second-facelift Mazda 616 sedan (Europe), 1974–1978

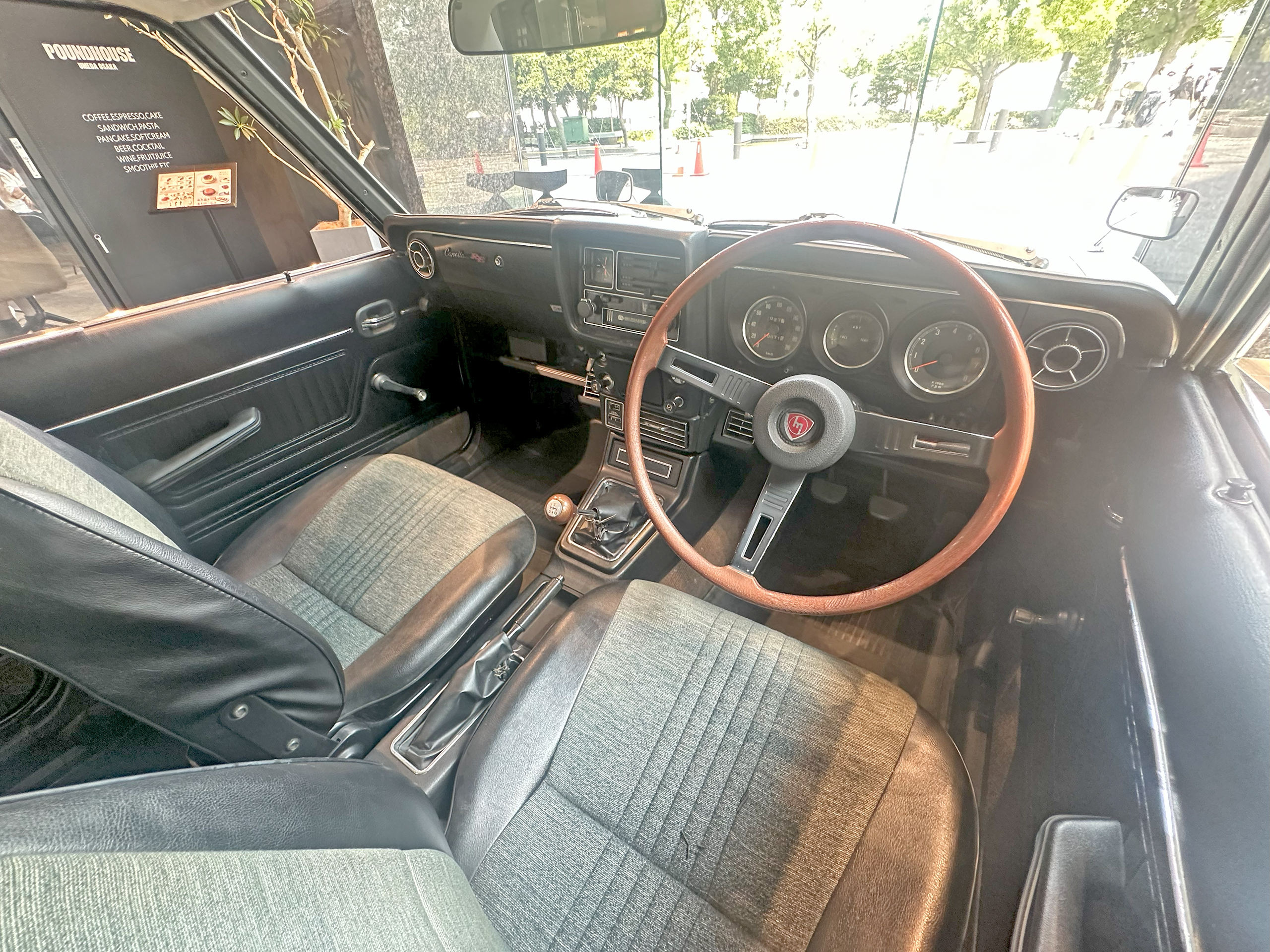
Capella Rotary sedan GR interior

== Second generation (CB; 1978–1982) ==
CB
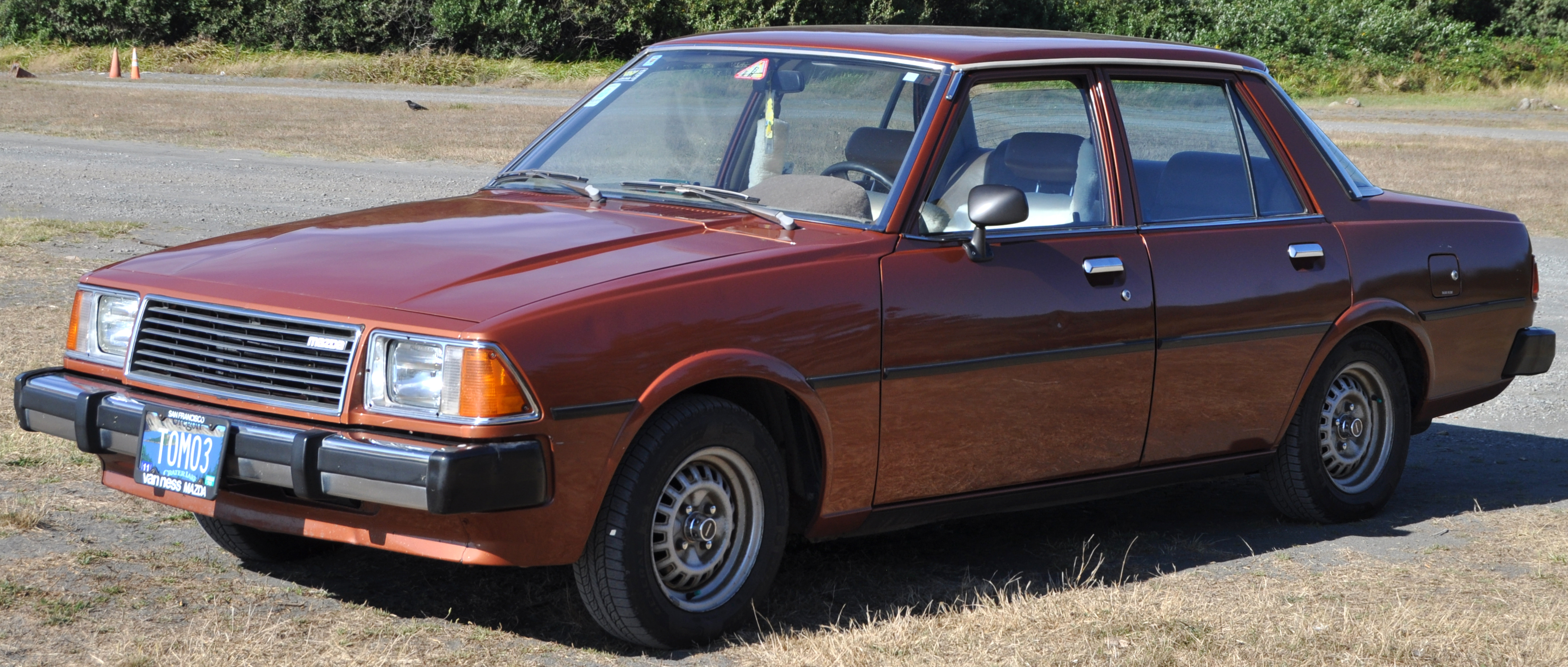
- Pre-facelift Sedan

Overview
- Model code: CB
- Also called: Mazda 626; Mazda Montrose (UK); Mazda Rx626
- Production: 1978–1982
- Assembly: Japan: Hiroshima; New Zealand: Auckland; Indonesia: Bekasi (PT. National Motors)

Body and chassis
- Body style: 2-door coupé 4-door sedan
- Layout: Longitudinal front-engine, rear-wheel drive

Powertrain
- Engine: 1.6 L NA I4; 1.8 L VC I4; 2.0 L MA I4
- Transmission: 4-speed manual 5-speed manual 3-speed Jatco automatic

Dimensions
- Wheelbase: 2,510 mm (98.8 in)
- Length: 4,260–4,300 mm (167.7–169.3 in)
- Width: 1,580–1,660 mm (62.2–65.4 in)
- Height: 1,395 mm (54.9 in) (coupe); 1,420 mm (55.9 in) (sedan)
- Curb weight: 975–1,080 kg (2,150–2,381 lb)

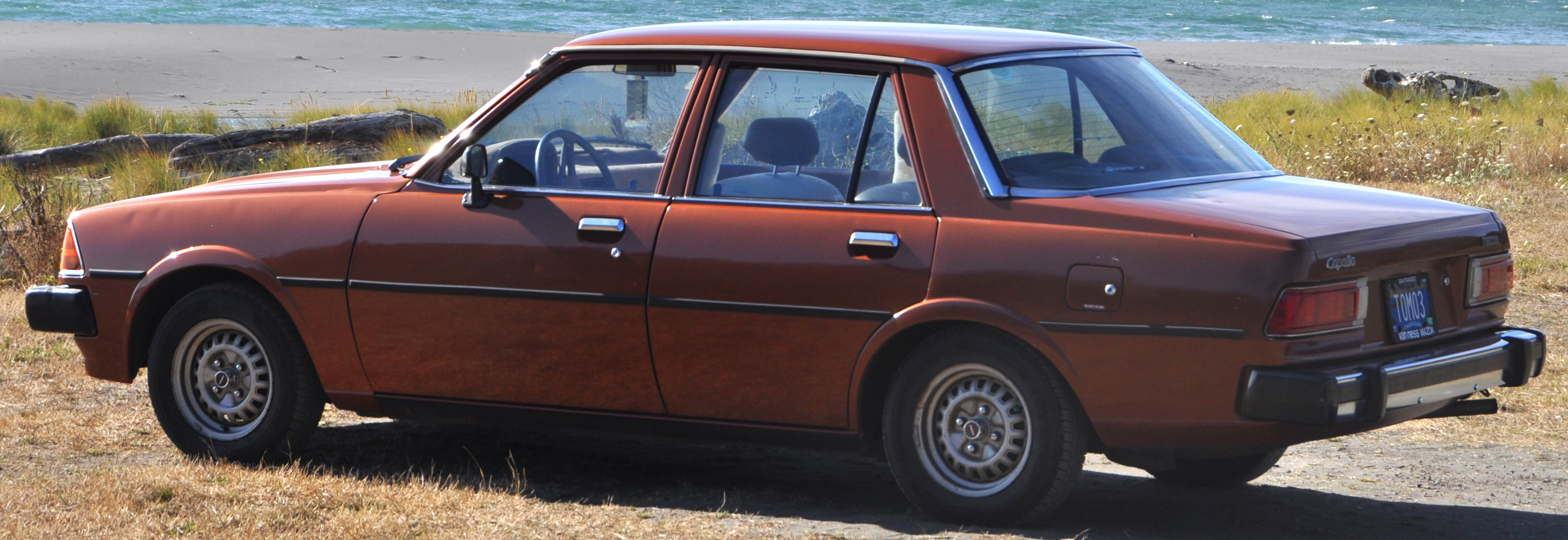
Pre-facelift Sedan (United States)

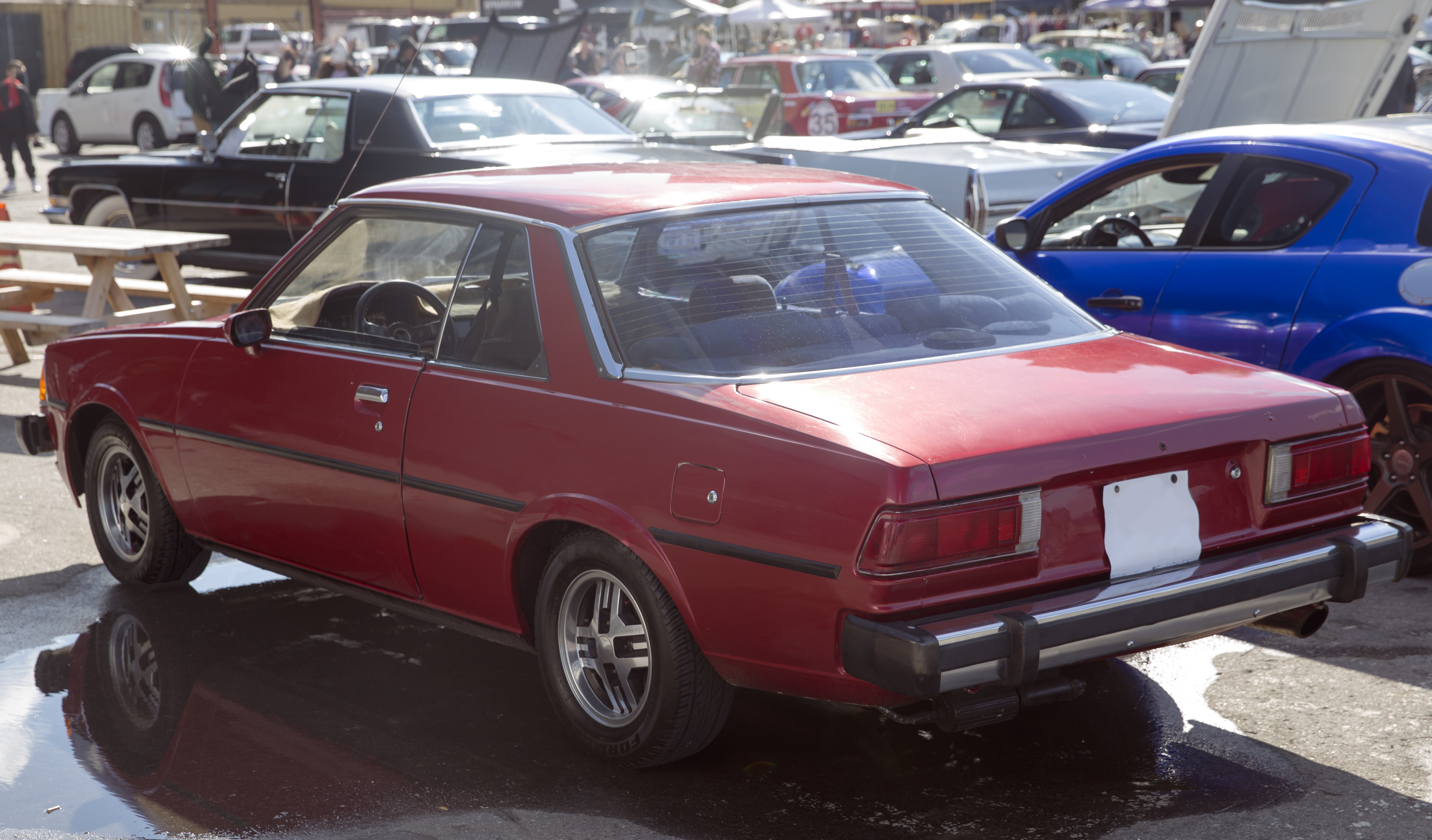
Pre-facelift Coupe (United States)

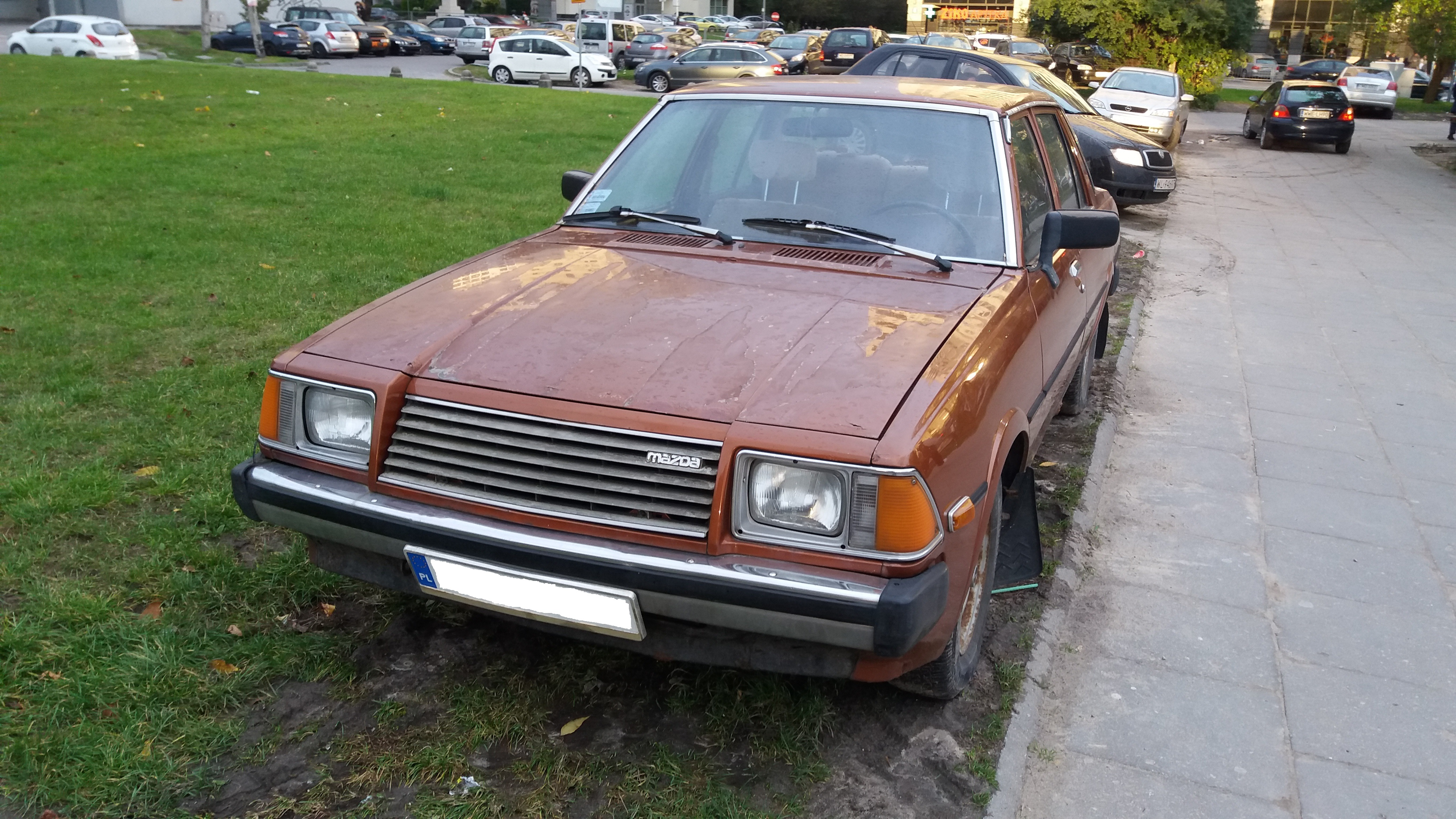
Pre-facelift Sedan (Europe), equipped with 1.6- or 1.8-liter engine

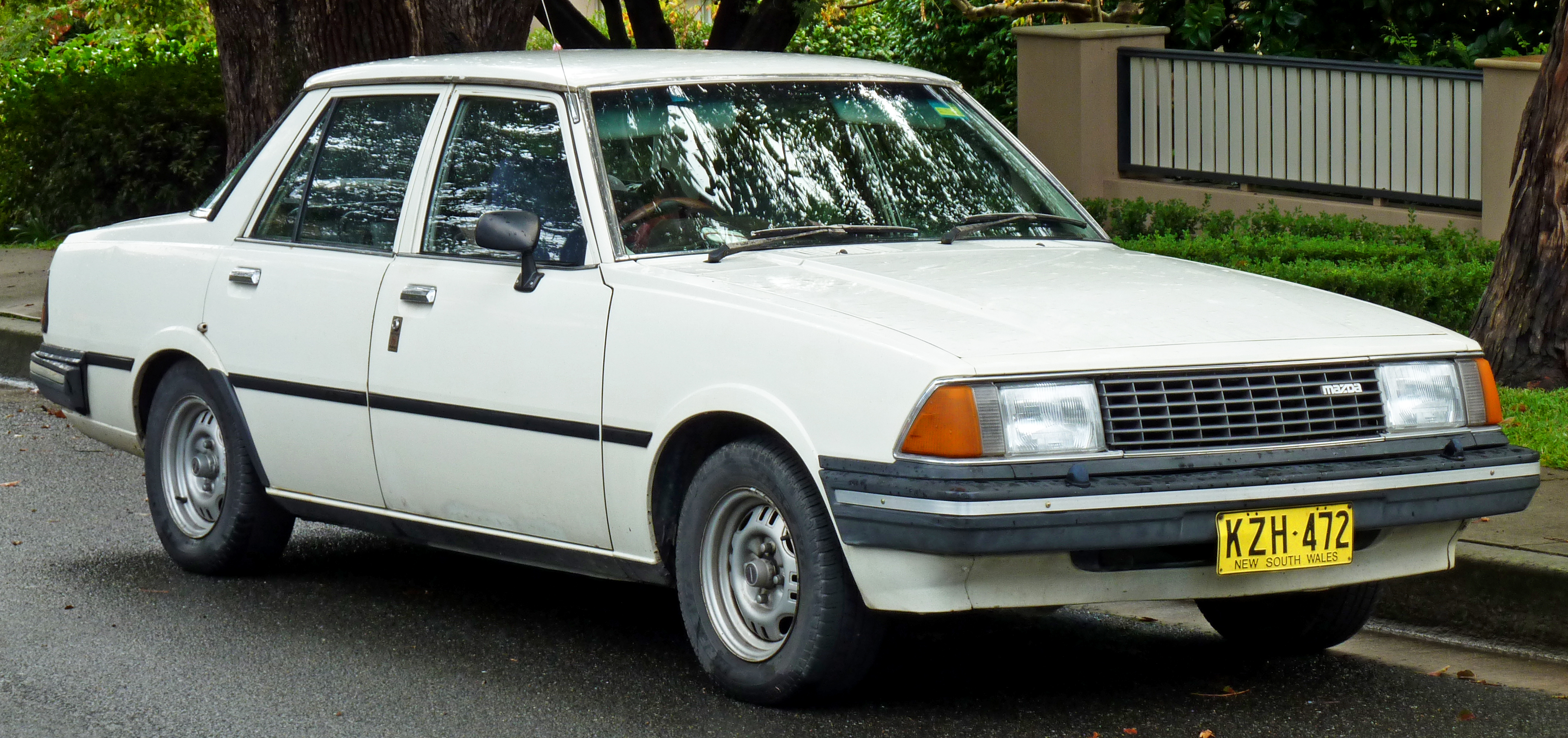

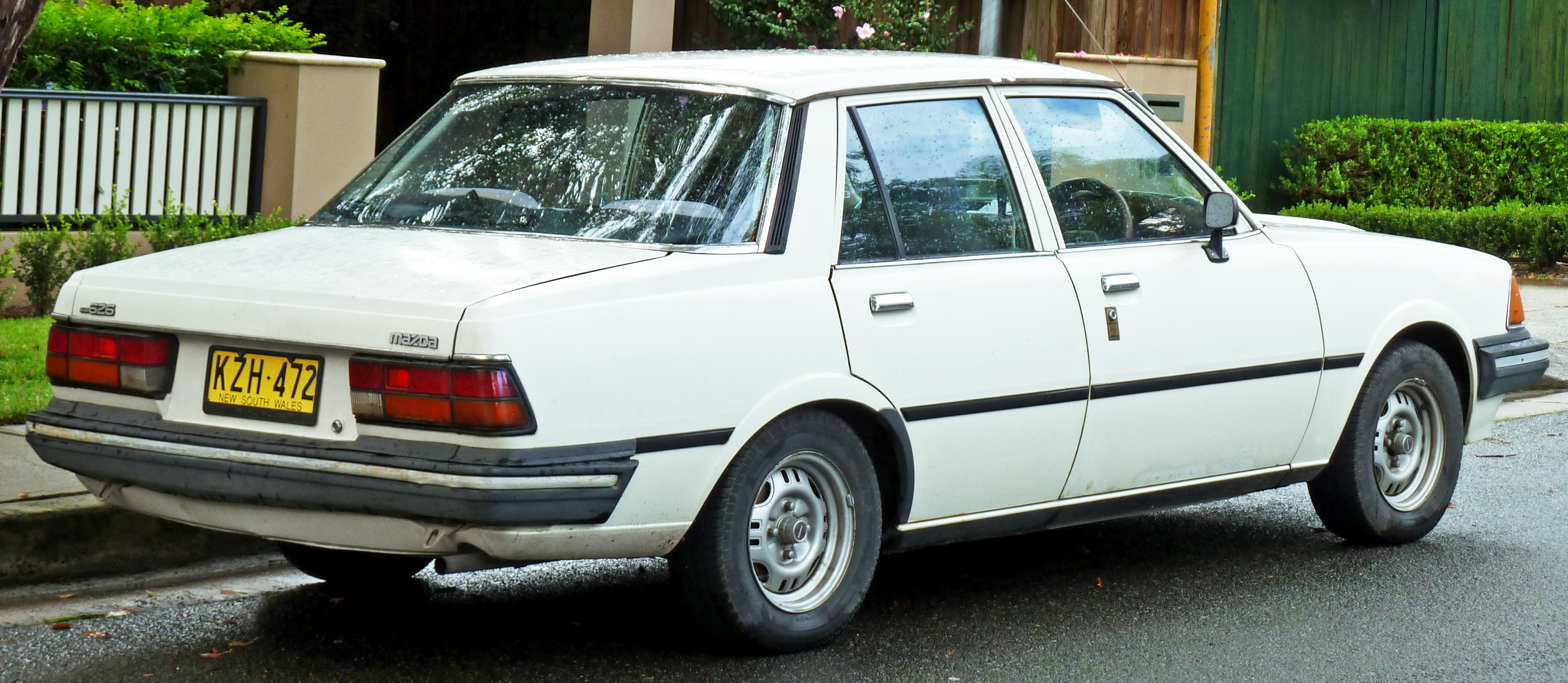
Facelift Sedan (Australia)

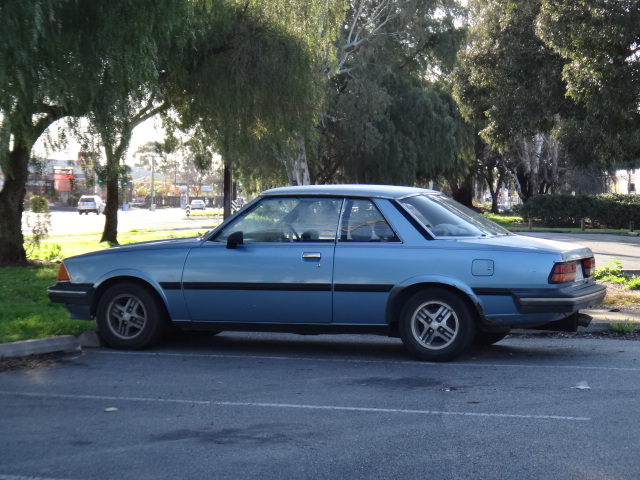
Facelift Coupe (Australia)

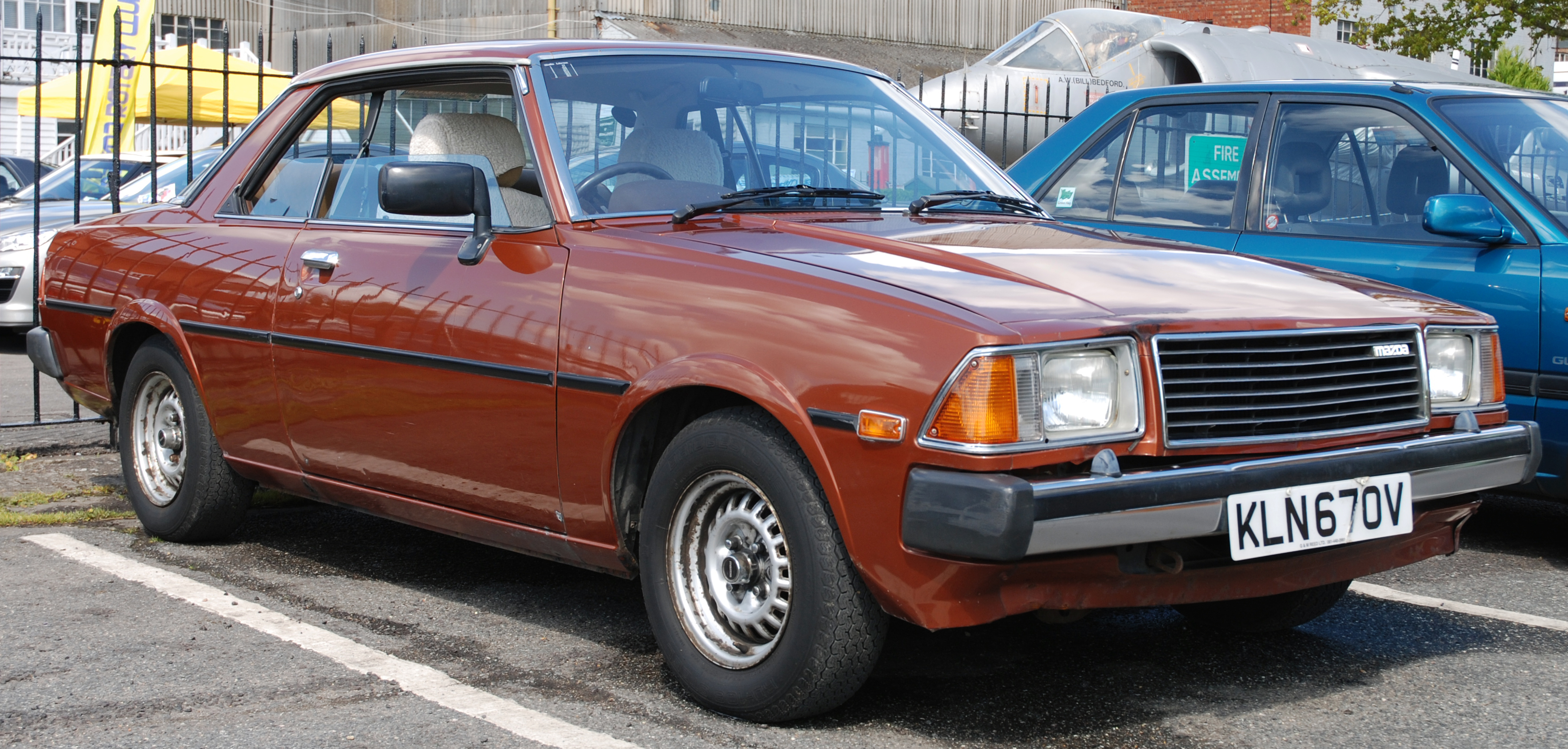
1980 Mazda Montrose 2.0 Coupé

The second-generation rear-wheel drive Capella was available between October 1977 and 1982, in both sedan and coupé forms. It was marketed in export markets as the 626, with the exception of the United Kingdom, where it was marketed as the Mazda Montrose, the name honoring the local Mazda dealership in Montrose. The Montrose was offered as an alternative to the Ford Cortina, which was popular at the time. It was released in 1978, although the model's introduction to most markets was delayed until 1979. Early models had two slightly different frontal treatments. Models equipped with 1.6 or 1.8-litre engines came with a more pronounced sloping grille and models with the 2-litre engine came with a more flush grille. The 626 received a front and rear facelift in September 1980 but this model was not marketed in the UK, where the Montrose's styling remained unchanged. It was, however, offered in the rest of Europe and this and later generations were particularly popular in Germany. This Capella achieved an aerodynamic Cx value of 0.38.

The coupé and sedan were mechanically identical, with front MacPherson struts and a coil sprung solid axle at the back mounted on four links with a transverse Panhard rod providing addition location. Either a five-speed manual or three-speed automatic transmission and recirculating ball steering completed the mechanical specification. The CB also featured a split-folding rear seat. In Japan, the Capella came with 1.6-, 1.8-, or 2.0-litre engines (the 2.0 only being introduced in the end of March 1979). All had twin-barrel carburettors and produced 90, 100, and 110 PS JIS (66, 74, or 81 kW). The higher equipped versions received the larger US bumpers and were thus somewhat longer overall.

The Mazda 626 badge was used for the first time in some markets, replacing the earlier "616". The 626 was typically fitted with the 1.6- or 2.0-litre version of the Mazda F/MA, which produced from 75 to 90 PS (55 to 66 kW), though only the 2.0-litre was available in the United States. The 626 was facelifted in November 1980, with the update bringing flush-fitting headlamps and a new grille insert. Other changes included redesigned tail-lights, a revised dash, new trim and improved dynamics. The grille was lengthened slightly to remove the body-coloured gap between the headlamps and grille on the original model. It was also reduced in height so that the grille and headlamps formed a single "band" across the front-end.

In the United States, the facelift appeared for the 1981 model year and meant more black trim (including the bumpers) and a new grille and headlights. The engine also received new emissions equipment, consisting of two catalytic converters, an air pump, and an air control valve, which robbed the 2.0 four of some power. Also new for 1981 was the "Luxury" model, which featured ample equipment. The entire range received softer suspension settings for increased comfort, but these were tightened up again during the 1982 model year.

Sedans of this generation were also assembled in New Zealand in three versions – four-speed manual base, three-speed automatic mid range and five-speed manual "Limited." Facelift models were much the same but some had velour upholstery and tinted glass. In 1982, Mazda New Zealand offered a locally assembled limited-edition model called the Anniversary to mark 10 years of local build. Based on the Limited, this model had larger US-style bumpers, additional driving lights in the grille, a standard AM radio (this was a year before FM stereo radio was introduced in NZ) plus alloy wheels and unique velour upholstery. This was also the first locally built Mazda to have a laminated windscreen as standard.

In Australia, the CB series was launched in December 1978. It was available as a four-door sedan in three trim levels (Standard, Deluxe and Super Deluxe) and as a two-door Super Deluxe hardtop. The engine was the 2.0-litre 63 kW (84 hp) inline-four engine available with three transmissions (four-speed and five-speed manual or three-speed automatic). The Deluxe model added cloth-inserted seats, push button radio, bumper rubber inserts, rubber body side protection mouldings, intermittent wipers, chrome wheel rings, map reading lights, and seat back map pockets. The Super Deluxe added halogen headlamps, window tint, FM radio, bumper overriders, and electronic safety check panel. For the facelift model from 1980 in Australia, the base "Standard" model was renamed "Special", while the sedan and hardtop Super Deluxe trims each received unique (to trim level and body variant) wheel trims. A rear folding armrest, central locking and sunroof were added to the Super Deluxe sedan. Another minor update in 1981 changed the wheel designs for the Super Deluxe.

Model	Engine	Power	Torque
World	1,586 cc NA I4	75 PS (55 kW)	12.2 kg⋅m (120 N⋅m; 88 lb⋅ft)
World	1,970 cc MA I4	90 PS (66 kW)	15.9 kg⋅m (156 N⋅m; 115 lb⋅ft)
Japan	1,586 cc NA I4	90 PS (66 kW)	13.0 kg⋅m (127 N⋅m; 94 lb⋅ft)
Japan	1,769 cc VC I4	100 PS (74 kW)	15.2 kg⋅m (149 N⋅m; 110 lb⋅ft)
Japan	1,970 cc MA I4	110 PS (81 kW)	17.0 kg⋅m (167 N⋅m; 123 lb⋅ft)
North America	1,970 cc MA I4	80 hp (60 kW); 74 hp (55 kW)	105 lb⋅ft (142 N⋅m; 14.5 kg⋅m)

== Third generation (GC; 1982–1987) ==
GC
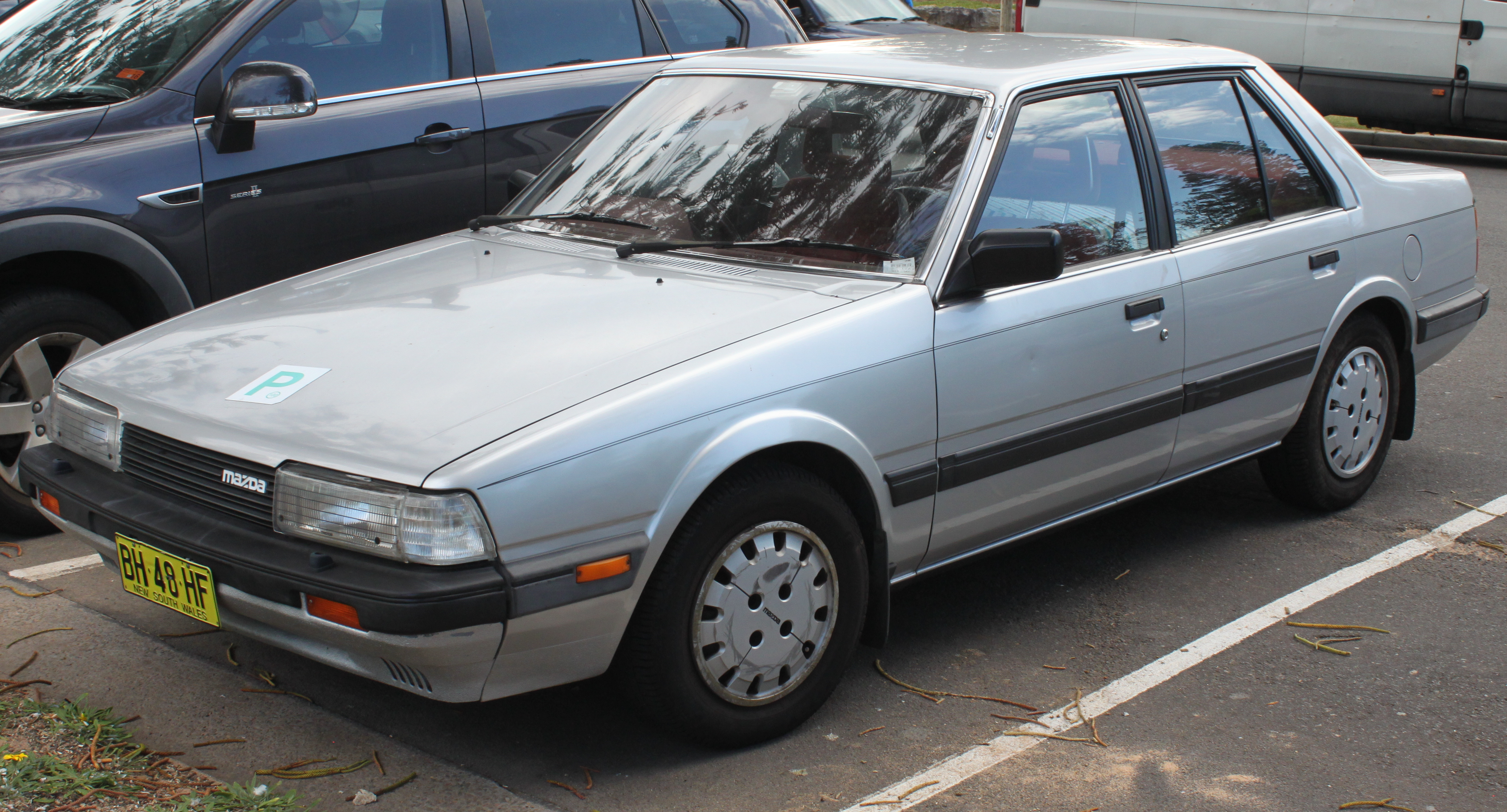

Overview
- Model code: GC
- Also called: Mazda 626; Ford Telstar
- Production: 1982–1987
- Assembly: Japan: Hofu; Colombia: Bogotá (CCA); New Zealand: Auckland Indonesia: Bekasi (PT. National Motors)

Body and chassis
- Body style: 2-door coupé 4-door sedan 5-door hatchback
- Layout: Transverse front-engine, front-wheel drive
- Related: Ford Telstar; Kia Concord/Capital

Powertrain
- Engine: Petrol: 1.6 L F6 I4; 1.8 L F8 I4; 2.0 L FE I4; 2.0 L FET turbo I4; Diesel: 2.0 L RF I4
- Transmission: 5-speed manual 3/4-speed automatic

Dimensions
- Wheelbase: 2,510 mm (98.8 in)
- Length: 4,520 mm (177.8 in)
- Width: 1,690 mm (66.5 in)
- Height: 1,410 mm (55.5 in)
- Curb weight: 1,050 kg (2,315 lb)

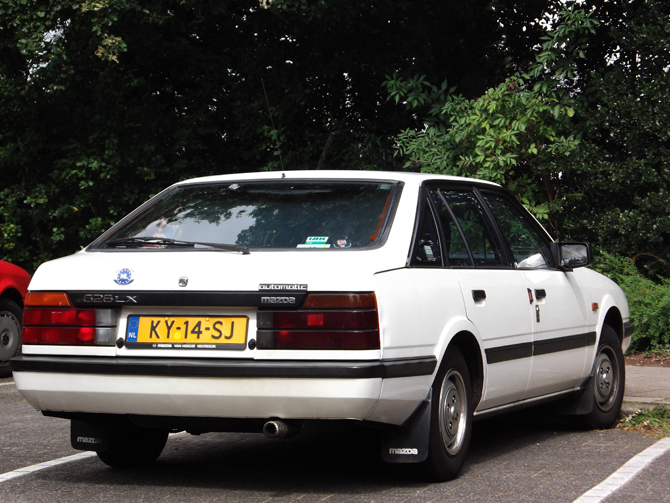
Hatchback (pre-facelift)

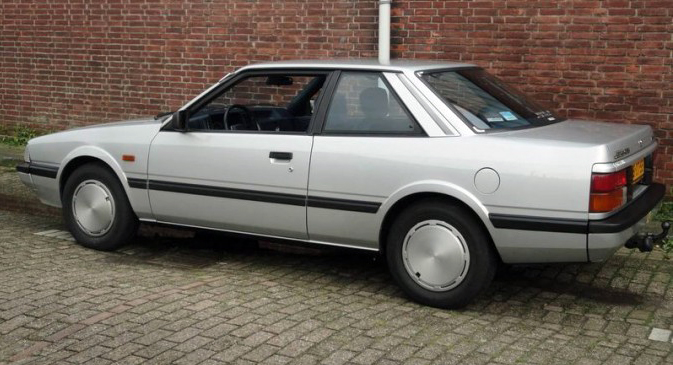
Coupé (pre-facelift)

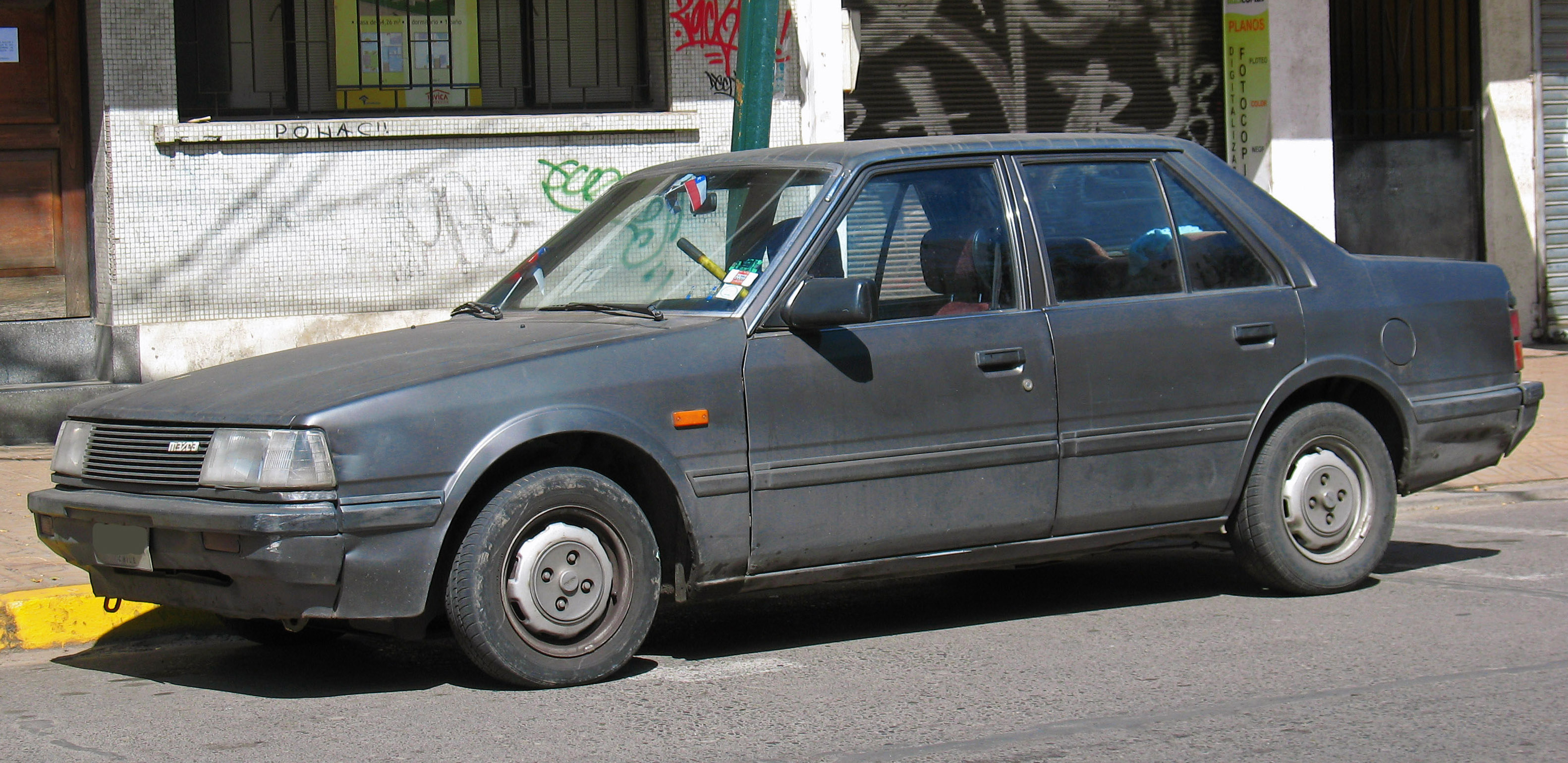
Short-nosed sedan (pre-facelift, Colombian assembly)

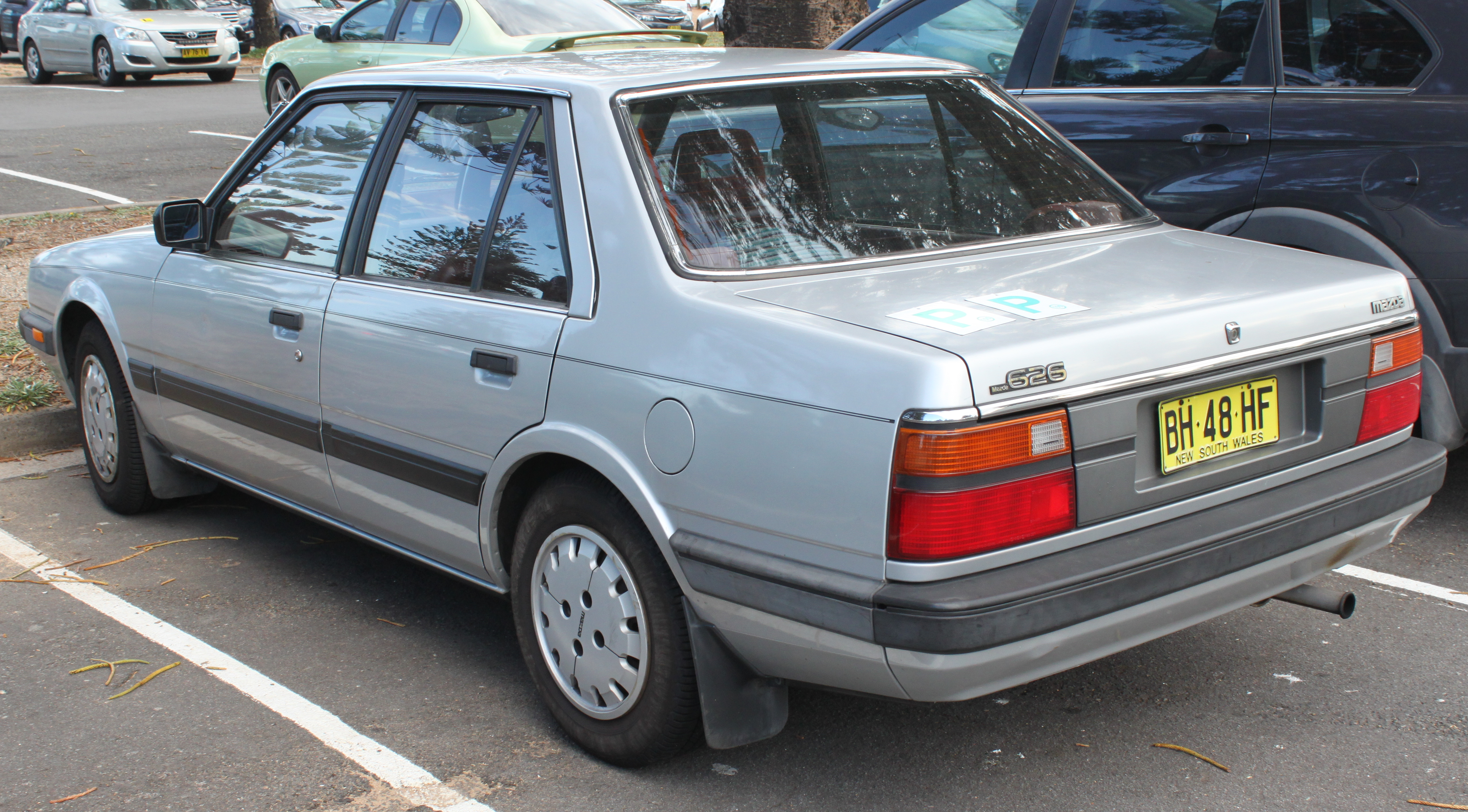
Sedan (facelift)

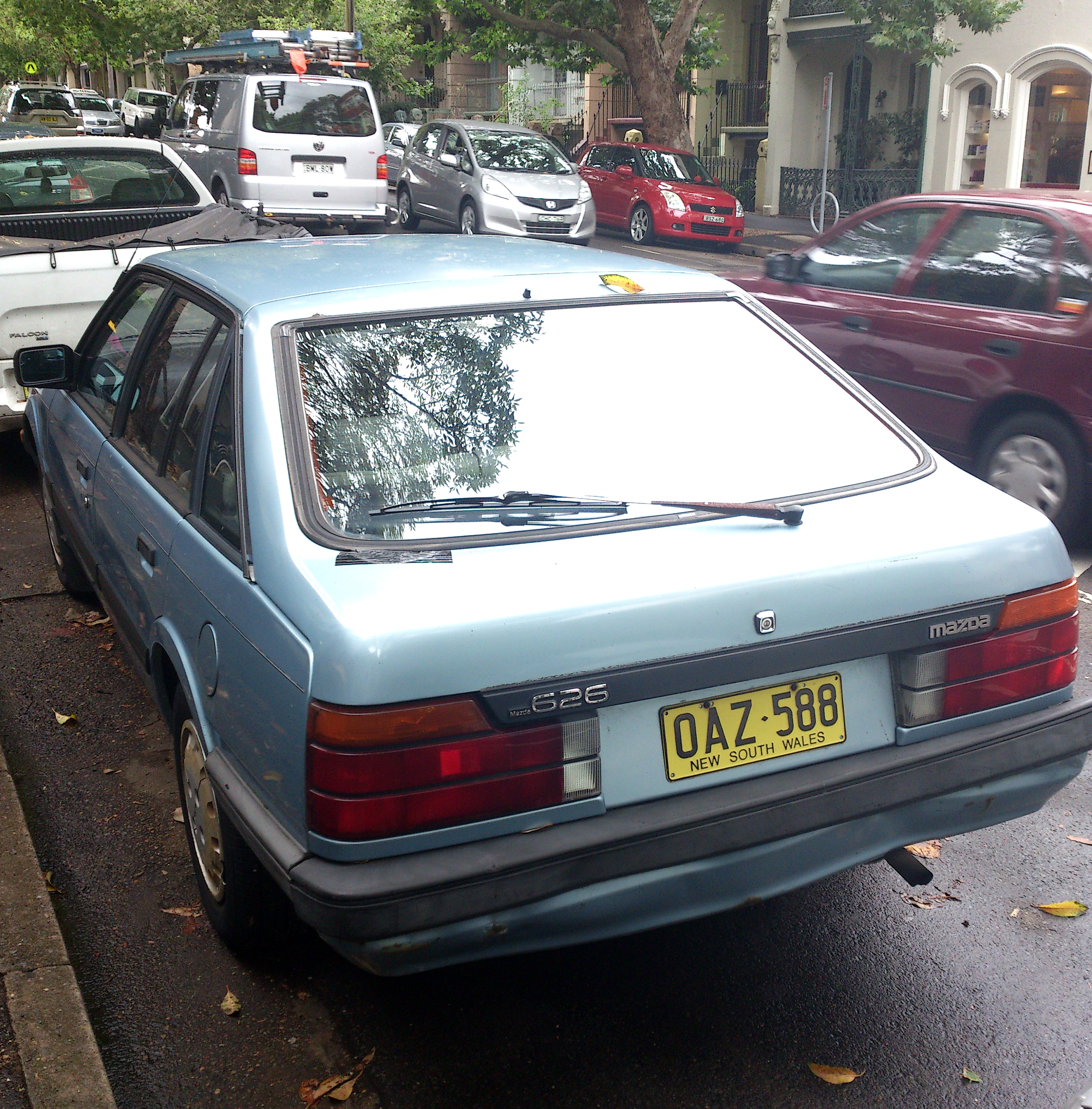
Hatchback (facelift)

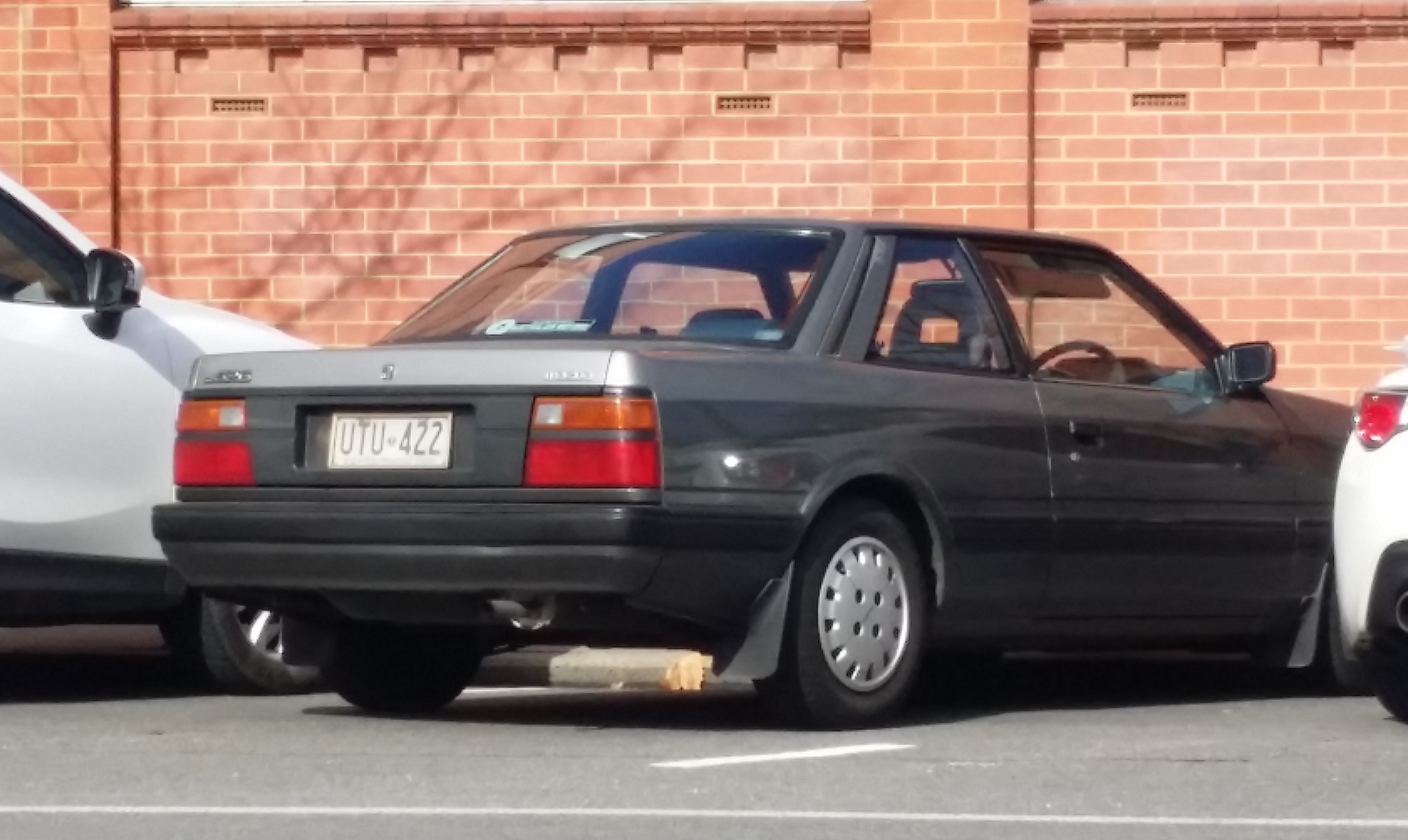
Coupé (facelift)

In September 1982, the third-generation Capella was released using the new front-wheel-drive Mazda GC platform. As before, the international version was named the 626, with this version being named Import Car of the Year by Motor Trend magazine, the Car of the Year Japan award in 1982, and Car of the Year by Wheels magazine for 1983. It came in fifth in the 1984 European Car of the Year, the highest finish up to that date for a Japanese car. It immediately sold very well across Europe.

Sedan and coupé bodystyles were offered as before, with – due to demand – a five-door hatchback variant added. Inline-four engines displacing 1.6, 1.8, and 2.0 litres were offered, with the 2.0-litre also available with a turbo and 145 PS (107 kW). In September 1983 a 2.0-litre diesel was added to the lineup. In other regions including Finland, the 626 offered 101 PS (74 kW) with a twin barrel carburetor. The Swiss market only received a 95 PS (70 kW) 2-litre version, with the lower power a result of different emissions standards. In addition to the commonly seen model, there was also a short-nosed version with smaller headlamps and a larger grille, which necessitated a different bonnet as well. This model was sold in Southeast Asia and Oceania and possibly other markets including the GCC countries. A dealer optional model with the front end and pop-up headlights from the Mazda 929/Cosmo (HB) was also available to special customers in Indonesia.

The rear suspension was now independent, and though the wheelbase remained the same as the previous model, it was an entirely different car. A SOHC non-turbo diesel 2.0-litre RF 66 PS (49 kW) engine was made available. The diesel also benefitted from ventilated brakes up front and a variable ratio steering rack, to minimize the effects of the (slight) additional weight. European markets also received a 1.6-litre F6 80 PS (59 kW) engine. The placement of the power window controls was on the centre console, ahead of the gear shift/automatic transmission gear selector, as opposed to the traditional installation of the window switches on the respective doors.

=== North America ===
The new 2.0-litre FE engine was up to 83 hp (62 kW) for the North American market, where the car received larger bumpers and sealed-beam headlights as per federal regulations. A 626 GT (also called the Turbo in Canada) was introduced in 1986 using the 120 hp (89 kW) and 150 lb⋅ft (203 N⋅m) FET engine. The rest of the line got a new front clip with dual (rather than quad) headlights and an entirely new interior, and fuel injection on the base engine meant 93 hp (69 kW). A new four-speed automatic, some trim changes, and five new colours were introduced for 1987, the last model year of this series.

=== Australasia ===
In Australia, the 626 was fitted with the 2-litre FE engine, producing 70 kW (95 PS; 94 hp) at 5,000 rpm. Twenty diesel-engined examples were also imported officially into Australia beginning in 1983. Until the mid-1985 facelift when the bodystyles were unified, the sedan received the shorter nose design, while hatchbacks and coupés had the more common, longer nose. The 1985 facelift also brought with it altered taillights and grilles, as well as minor differences to the side trim, hubcaps, etcetera. On the inside, the gauges were replaced with redesigned, round units (except for the SE which upgraded its digital instrumentation from vacuum fluorescent to liquid-crystal display), and modified trim and seats. Under the skin, NVH was improved through revised engine mounts and changes to insulation material, and suspension and bushing modifications. The power steering was updated to use a variable ratio rack. All Australian models now received disc brakes all around.

Ford Asia Pacific (FASPAC) also sold the 626 as the Ford Telstar from 1983 (complete with slightly different styling and dashboard) in place of the European-sourced Ford Sierra, although Ford New Zealand did offer the Sierra wagon after the long best-selling Cortina estate car was discontinued, on account of the Mazda's lack of an equivalent model. Available in both 1.6- and 2.0-litre versions, the Sierra wagon was released in May 1984.

Mazda New Zealand initially assembled 626 "short nose" 1.8-litre four-door sedan and a "long nose" 2.0-litre five-door model with a higher trim level including a digital instrument panel. A small number of two-door coupés were imported built-up from Japan. Laminated windscreens were now standard. A midlife facelift for the 1985 model year brought a completely new dashboard with orange digital LCD electronic displays in top models (in place of the earlier luminescent green) and the sedan now had the long nose and 2.0-litre engine. Ford's Telstar received similar changes.

=== Africa ===
The GC, locally assembled by Sigma, was released in South Africa in 1983. Due to a local content programme then in force, a facelifted version continued in production by Samcor until 1993. This featured the front end of the GD coupé, but with amber lens indicators and a blanked-off grille, as well as the rear lights from the Ford Telstar, which was not sold locally, Ford still offering the Sierra. The GD was not sold in South Africa, although it was assembled in neighbouring Zimbabwe by Willowvale Motor Industries in both sedan and wagon versions.

=== Colombia ===
The 626 L entered production in Colombia with CCA (Compañía Colombiana Automotriz) in May 1984, as a four-door sedan equipped with the 92 PS 1.8-litre engine. The LX (five-door) and GLX (coupé) versions followed in 1985, with the GLX coupé receiving the 102 PS 2.0-litre engine and more luxurious equipment including power steering and windows, as well as digital instrumentation. In the first quarter of 1986 the range was facelifted: the taillights were revised and the hatchback and coupé received new, larger bumpers. The L (sedan) was the only model left with the 1.8 engine as the LX (hatchback) was now a 2-litre, closer to the coupé in its specifications. The GC-series continued to be available until the beginning of 1988, when the next generation 626 replaced it.

=== Engines ===
Market	Model	Years	Engine	Power	Torque	Notes
North America	Base	1983–1985	2.0 L FE I4	62 kW; 84 PS (83 hp)	149 N⋅m (110 lb⋅ft)	
North America	Base	1986–1987	2.0 L FE I4	69 kW; 94 PS (93 hp)	156 N⋅m (115 lb⋅ft)	EGi (Electronic Gasoline Injection)
North America	GT/Turbo	1986–1987	2.0 L FET I4	89 kW; 122 PS (120 hp)	203 N⋅m (150 lb⋅ft)	
Rest of the world	1.6	1983–1985	1.6 L F6 I4	60 kW (82 PS; 80 hp)	120 N⋅m (89 lb⋅ft)	
Rest of the world	1.6	1985–1987	1.6 L F6 I4	59 kW (80 PS; 79 hp)	119 N⋅m (88 lb⋅ft)	
Rest of the world	1.8	1983–1987	1.8 L F8 I4	67.5 kW (92 PS; 91 hp)	136.5 N⋅m (101 lb⋅ft)	Not in Europe
Rest of the world	2.0	1983–1987	2.0 L FE I4	75 kW (102 PS; 101 hp)	159 N⋅m (117 lb⋅ft)	
Rest of the world	2.0	1983–1987	2.0 L FE I4	66 kW (90 PS; 89 hp)	153 N⋅m (113 lb⋅ft)	Sweden
Rest of the world	2.0	1983–1986	2.0 L FE I4	70 kW (95 PS; 94 hp)	158 N⋅m (117 lb⋅ft)	Switzerland, Australia
Rest of the world	2.0	1986–1987	2.0 L FE I4	68 kW (92 PS; 91 hp)	150 N⋅m (111 lb⋅ft)	two-way catalytic converter
Rest of the world	2.0	1985–1987	2.0 L FE I4	68 kW (92 PS; 91 hp)	153 N⋅m (113 lb⋅ft)	EGi, three-way catalytic converter
Rest of the world	2.0	1985–1986	2.0 L FE I4	81 kW (110 PS; 109 hp)	171 N⋅m (126 lb⋅ft)	EGi, Switzerland
Rest of the world	2.0	1985–1987	2.0 L FE I4	88 kW (120 PS; 118 hp)	169 N⋅m (125 lb⋅ft)	EGi, GT trim level
Rest of the world	Diesel	1984–1987	2.0 L RF I4	47 kW (64 PS; 63 hp)	120 N⋅m (89 lb⋅ft)	62–67 PS depending on market/year

== Fourth generation (GD/GV; 1987–1992) ==
GD/GV
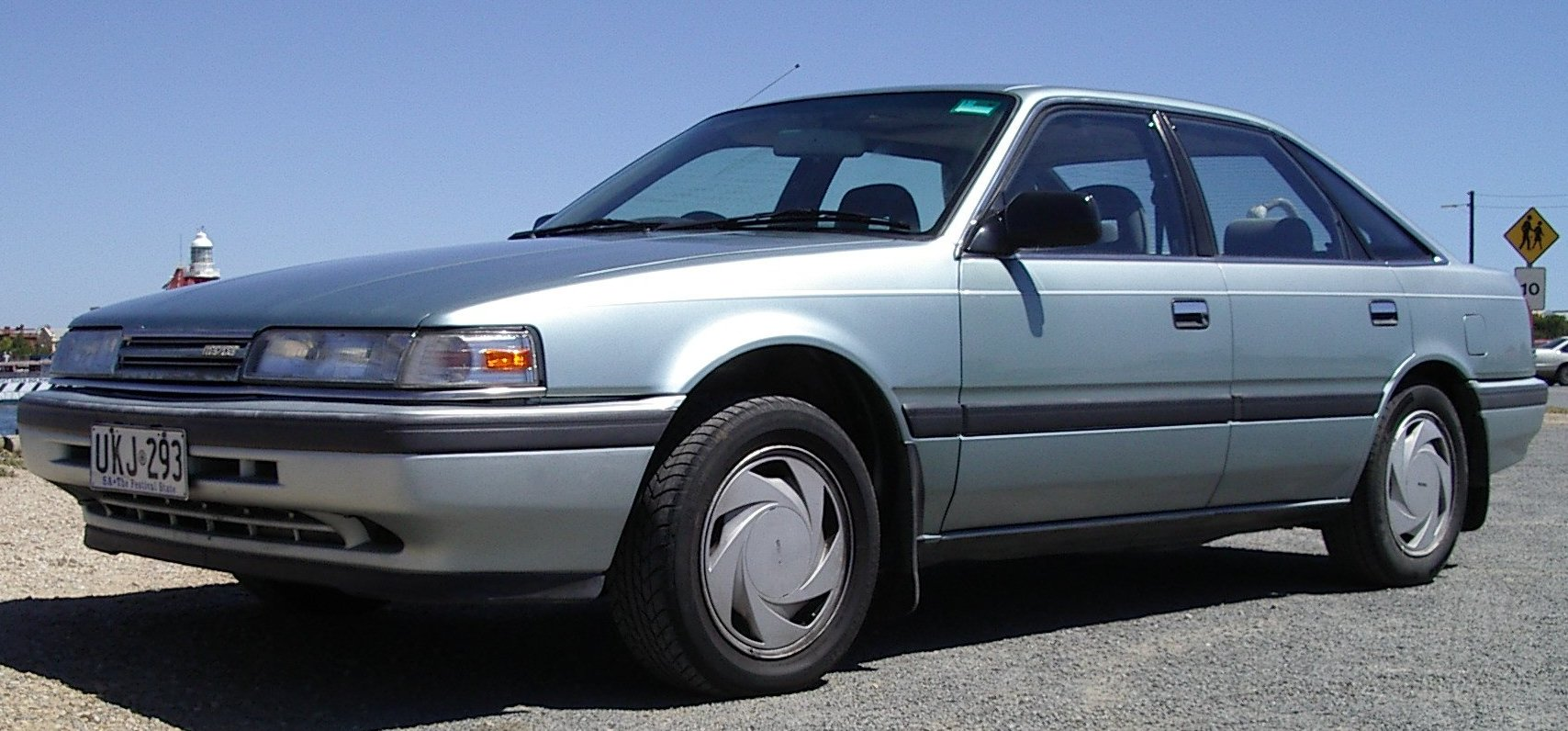
- 1988 Mazda 626 Turbo hatchback

Overview
- Model code: GD / GV
- Also called: Mazda 626; Mazda MX-6; Ford Telstar
- Production: 1987–1991; 1988–1999 (van); 1988–1997 (wagon)
- Assembly: Japan: Hofu; Colombia: Bogotá; United States: Flat Rock, Michigan (AAI); Zimbabwe: Willowvale (Willowvale Mazda Motor Industries); Indonesia: Bekasi (PT. National Motors)
- Designer: Hiroshi Yamamoto (1984)

Body and chassis
- Body style: 2-door coupé 4-door sedan 5-door hatchback 5-door station wagon (GV platform)
- Layout: Transverse front-engine, front-wheel drive Transverse front-engine, four-wheel drive
- Related: Mazda Persona; Ford Probe

Powertrain
- Engine: petrol: 1.6 L F6 I4 (export); 1.6 L B6 I4; 1.8 L F8 I4; 1.8 L F8 DOHC I4; 2.0 L FE I4; 2.0 L FE3 DOHC I4; 2.2 L F2 I4 2.2 L F2T turbo I4 (North America); diesel: 2.0 L RF I4; 2.0 L RF-CX Comprex I4
- Transmission: 4-speed manual 5-speed manual 4-speed automatic

Dimensions
- Wheelbase: 2,575 mm (101.4 in); 2,515 mm (99.0 in) (coupé)
- Length: 4,515–4,610 mm (177.8–181.5 in)
- Width: 1,689 mm (66.5 in)
- Height: 1,374 mm (54.1 in) (hatchback); 1,410 mm (55.5 in) (sedan)

The fourth-generation Capella was released in May 1987. It used the updated GD platform and some versions remained in production in Japan until 1996. Engines were new, though they still emphasized torque rather than outright power. Most of the world received 1.6, 1.8, 2.0, and 2.2 (non-turbo) engines. The GT model had a 2.0-litre FE-DOHC engine that produced 148 (without a catalytic converter) or 140 PS (with a catalytic converter). Some models were available with a new 2.0 diesel RF-CX engine, notable for its use of a pressure wave supercharger (Comprex), that previously could be found in the Mazda Bongo commercial. Diesel models were also exported to Europe, usually with the naturally aspirated engine. By 1990, the 1.6 had been discontinued in most markets, although JDM models intended for commercial use still used the little B6 engine.

The 626 was released in the US for the 1988 model year in three trims: DX, LX, and Turbo. Standard equipment included velour upholstery with front bucket seats, Mazda's Twin Trapezoidal Link independent rear suspension, and a fuel injected 2.2-litre SOHC 4-cylinder motor. The LX trim offered power door locks, mirrors and windows, cruise control, oscillating vents, and an upgraded sound system with a subwoofer among other things. The Turbo was equipped in similar fashion to the LX, adding an intercooler turbocharger system, adjustable dampening, and 15-inch alloy wheels.

The 626/Capella was available globally as a sedan, station wagon (estate), five-door hatchback, and as a coupé – although the coupé was renamed MX-6 for the North American and Australian markets, and the wagon was not offered in North America. In Japan, the five-door was sold as the "Capella CG" (for City Gear) and the coupé as the "Capella C^{2}" (Composite Coupé). There was also a four-door hardtop sedan with unique bodywork, sold only in Japan, called the Mazda Persona.

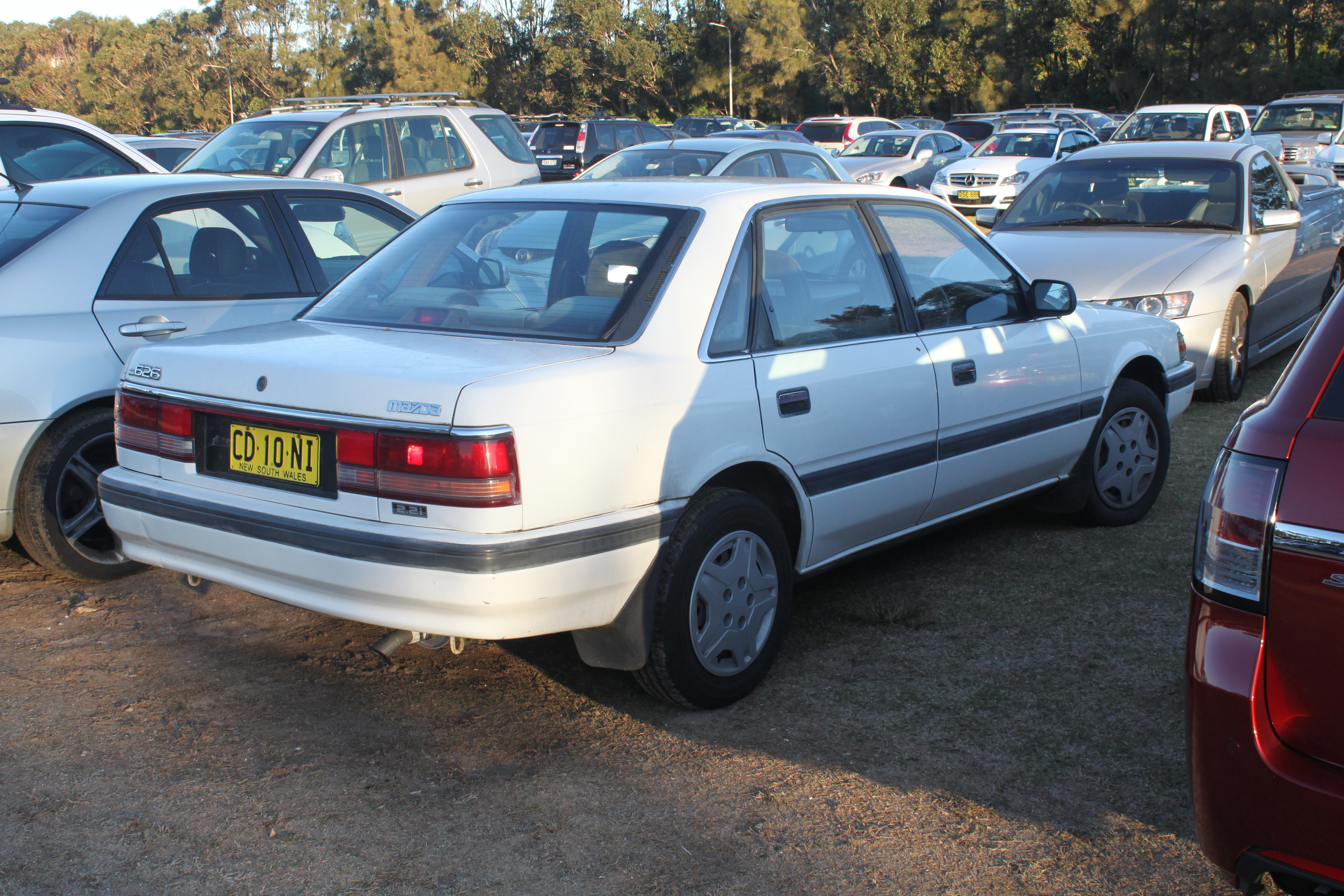
Sedan (pre-facelift)

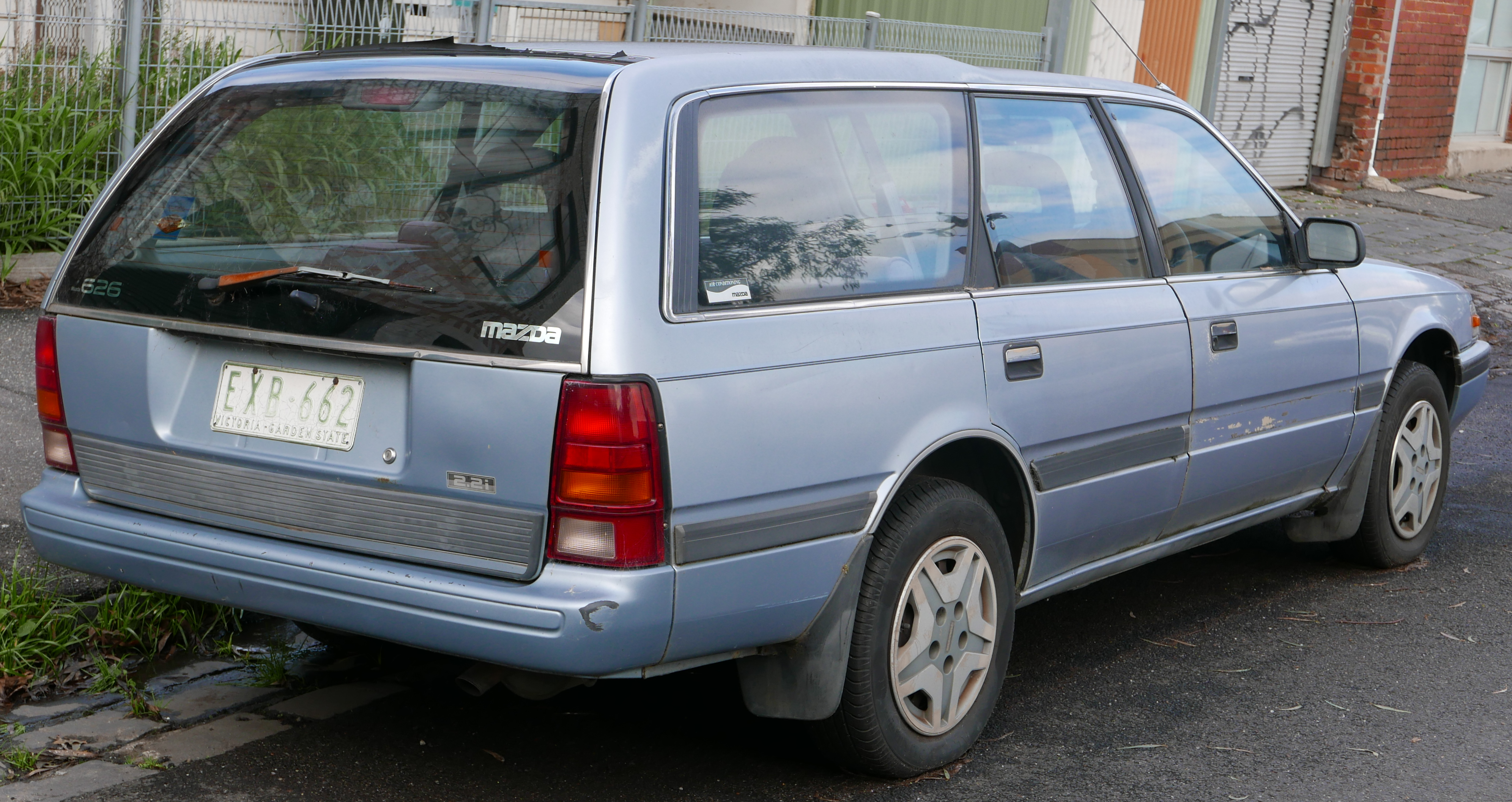
Wagon (pre-facelift)

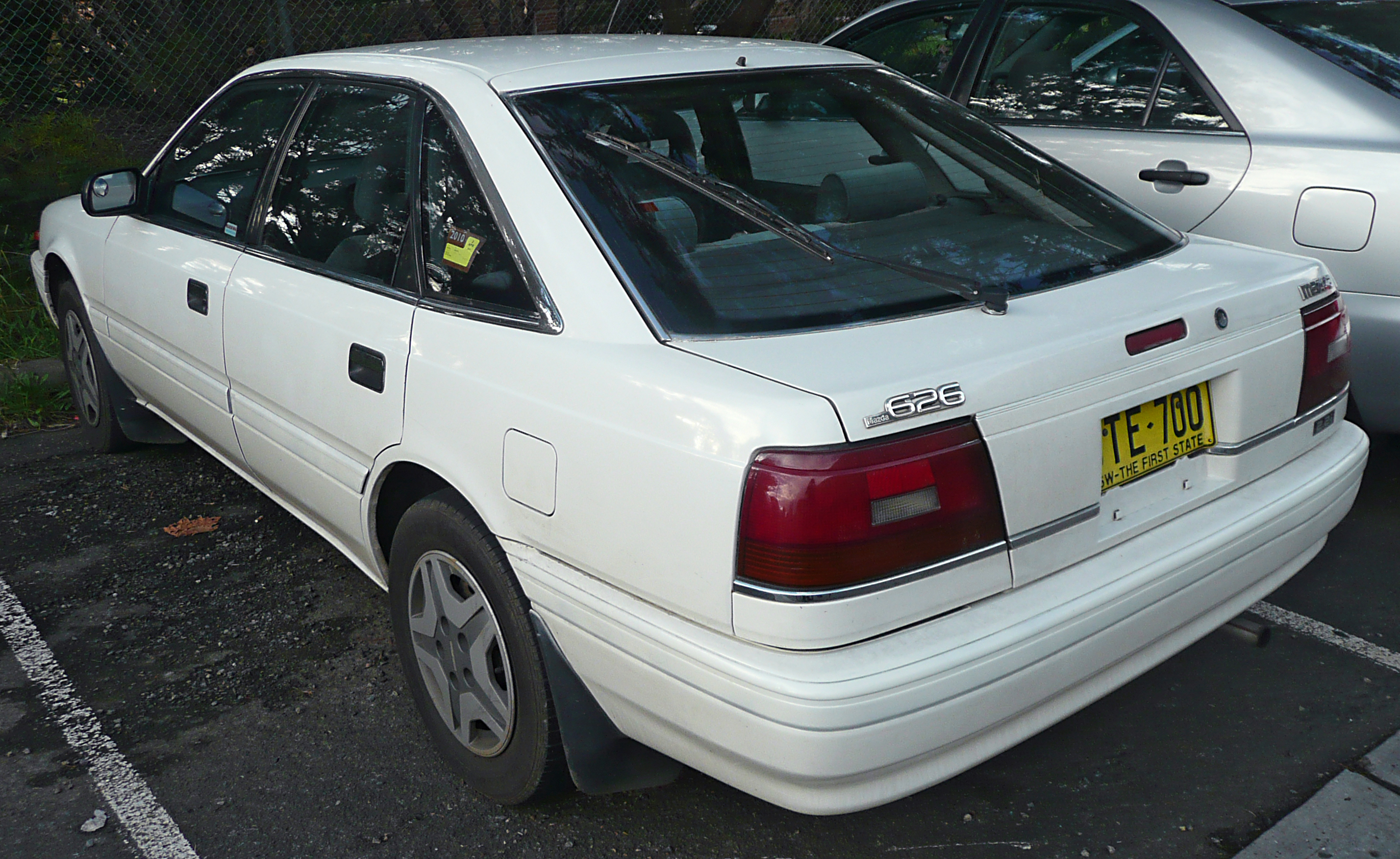
Hatchback (pre-facelift)

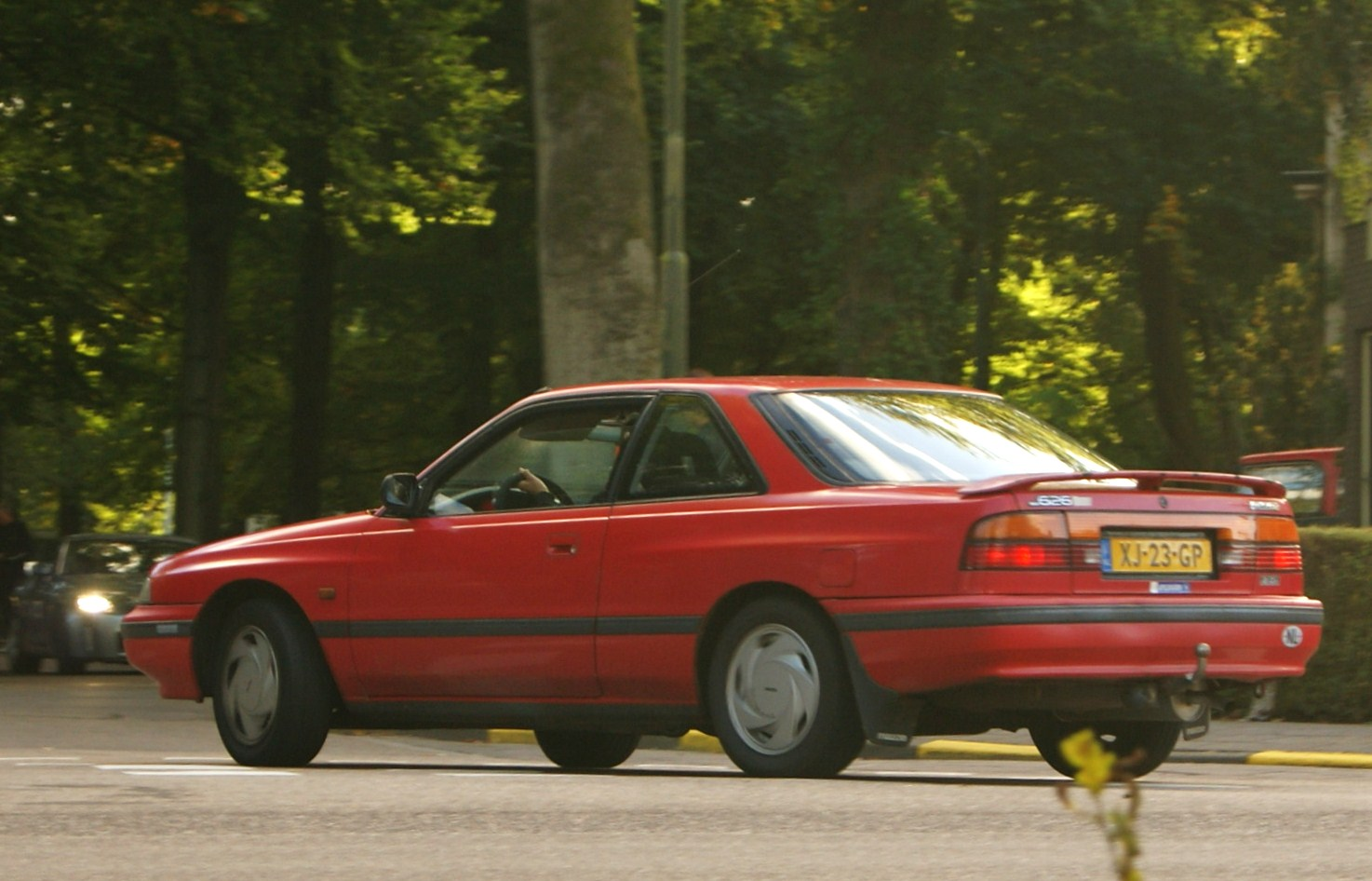
Coupe (pre-facelift)

The station wagon version, intended as a true load carrier, was introduced in the northern-hemisphere spring of 1988 on a slightly modified platform (called the GV). The station wagon also had a seven-seat option in some markets, only available on the front-wheel drive model. Five-speed manuals and four-speed automatics were offered, with a few export markets also receiving a four-speed manual. Four-wheel drive was introduced in July 1987 for some versions, although it was never made available in the coupé nor in the North American market. The four-wheel drive system featured a central differential as well as a viscous limited-slip differential at the rear axle. Another new option was 4-wheel-steering, introduced in February 1988, with Mazda's system being electronic and more complex than the 4WS system introduced by Honda on their 1988 Prelude. This system was only available in the five-door and the coupé. While not particularly successful in the marketplace, Japanese consumers could choose this option for longer than could export customers. All of the body styles also had optional ABS. The final facelift made a driver's side airbag an option for the buyer.

The 626 line was facelifted for 1990, although mainstream Japanese production ended in 1991. Ford kept building a manual-only GD series sedan, called the Telstar Classic, aimed at fleet customers. The Capella station wagon was still available up until November 1997 (1996 in export markets). As part of a Japanese trend at the time, it was also developed into an "RV", a sporting model with off-road pretensions. The Capella Van version, for commercial use only, actually continued in production until April 1999. It was equipped with the 1.6-litre B6 engine or the naturally aspirated diesel. When the new CG Capella was introduced in August 1994, the "Capella Cargo" received a facelift with a bigger grille and headlights and its name was changed to "Capella Wagon". The last addition to the Japanese lineup was a two-wheel-drive version of the 2.0 GT engine which arrived in June 1996.

UK trim levels were LX (1.8-litre 8v), GLX (1.8-litre 8v /2.0-litre 12v), GLX Executive (2.0-litre 12v) and GT (2.0-litre 16v) GLX Executive 4x4 (2.2-litre 12v) Some early 2.0GT models had four-wheel steering. There was also an estate model with either the 2.0-litre engine in GLX or GT trim, or the GLX Executive 4x4 2.2. The 2.0GT was also available in two-door coupe form. Most European markets received similar lineups, albeit with diesel options in many countries.

The MX-6 was built in Michigan alongside its platform-mate, the Ford Probe at AutoAlliance International, while North American market 626s were still imported from Japan. 626 hatchbacks disappeared after 1991 from the US Mazda model range. The base model now used Mazda's 110 hp (82 kW), 2.2-litre 3-valve SOHC F2 producing just 10 hp (7.5 kW) shy of the old turbocharged engine, and the new turbo was up to 145 hp (108 kW). The 1988 introduction of four-wheel steering to the 626 Turbo liftback, along with Honda's Prelude 4WS, marked the first 4WS systems for the US market. It was later also made available to the MX-6. In 1990, the 626 gained motorized seat belts for the US market only. Consumer response was strong.

As for the previous generation, Colombian-built versions were the L (sedan), LX (liftback), and GLX (coupé). They entered local production in the first half of 1988. The L used the 1.8 with 90 PS while the LX and GLX received the 102 PS two-litre - both engines still carburetted, with automatic chokes. This generation is known as "Asahi" in Colombia. The gearing was shorter than for the GC versions, to better suit the mountainous nature of the country.

Mazda New Zealand again assembled a range of four-door sedan and five-door hatchback models, supplemented by the newly available wagon, and imported the four-door sedan in GT Spec with 2.0-litre FE-DOHC. The imported coupe and top five-door version, both with electronically controlled rear-wheel steering. Ford New Zealand's Telstar line was similar, including the wagon and imported rear-wheel steering models (TBC, 4WS was never on the Telstar), but without the coupe. The wagon's arrival enabled Ford to drop the UK-sourced Sierra wagon from local assembly, simplifying model sourcing. The NZ-specification cars, though imported CKD, shared much of their specifications with uncatalyzed European models including the modified tail lamp assemblies with the mandatory-for-Europe fog light lenses though the bulbs and wiring were not included. This and later generations would also be imported used from Japan in later years, greatly widening the choice of models and specifications available in this market.

After the introduction of the next generation 626 (a rebadged Mazda Cronos), the station wagon continued to be assembled (alongside its slightly lower priced sister, the Telstar GL). Only a 2.0-litre GLX was offered, with the 81 kW (110 PS; 109 hp) uncatalyzed 12-valve engine.

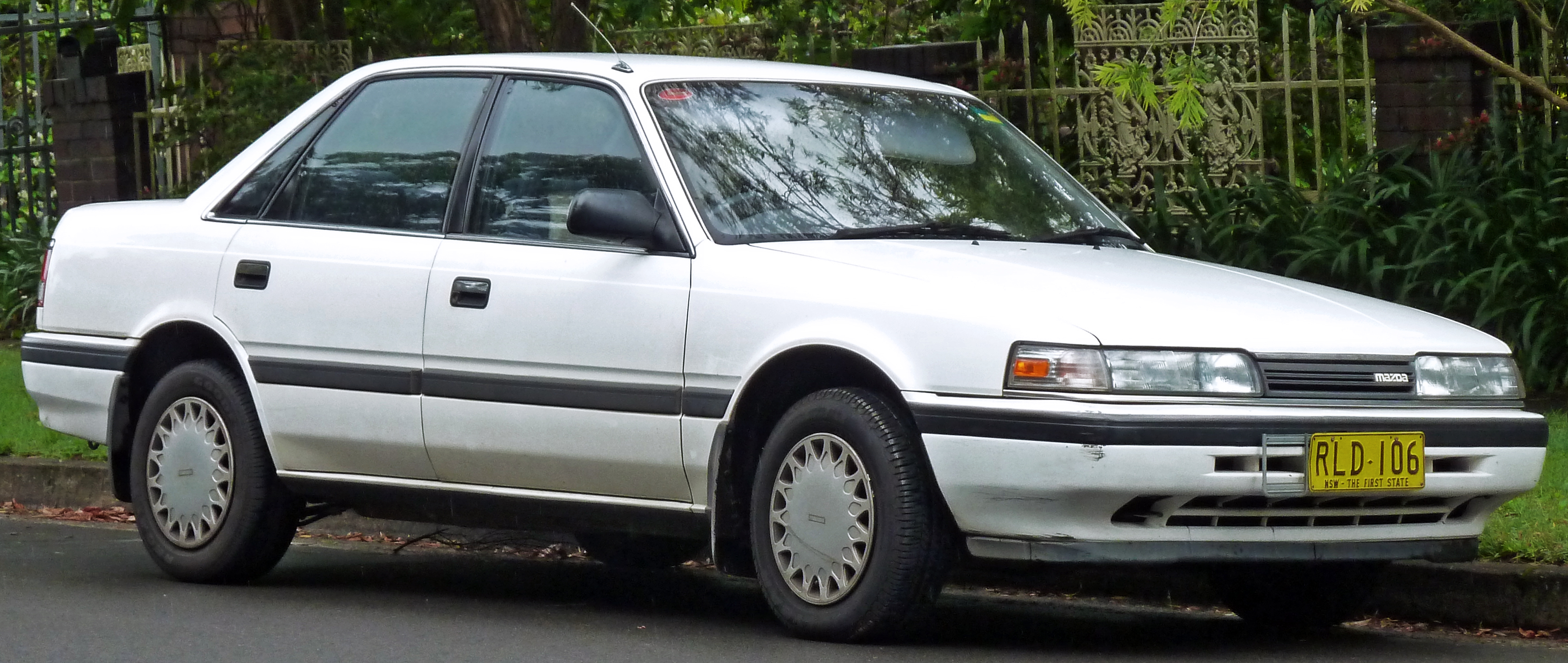
Sedan (facelift)

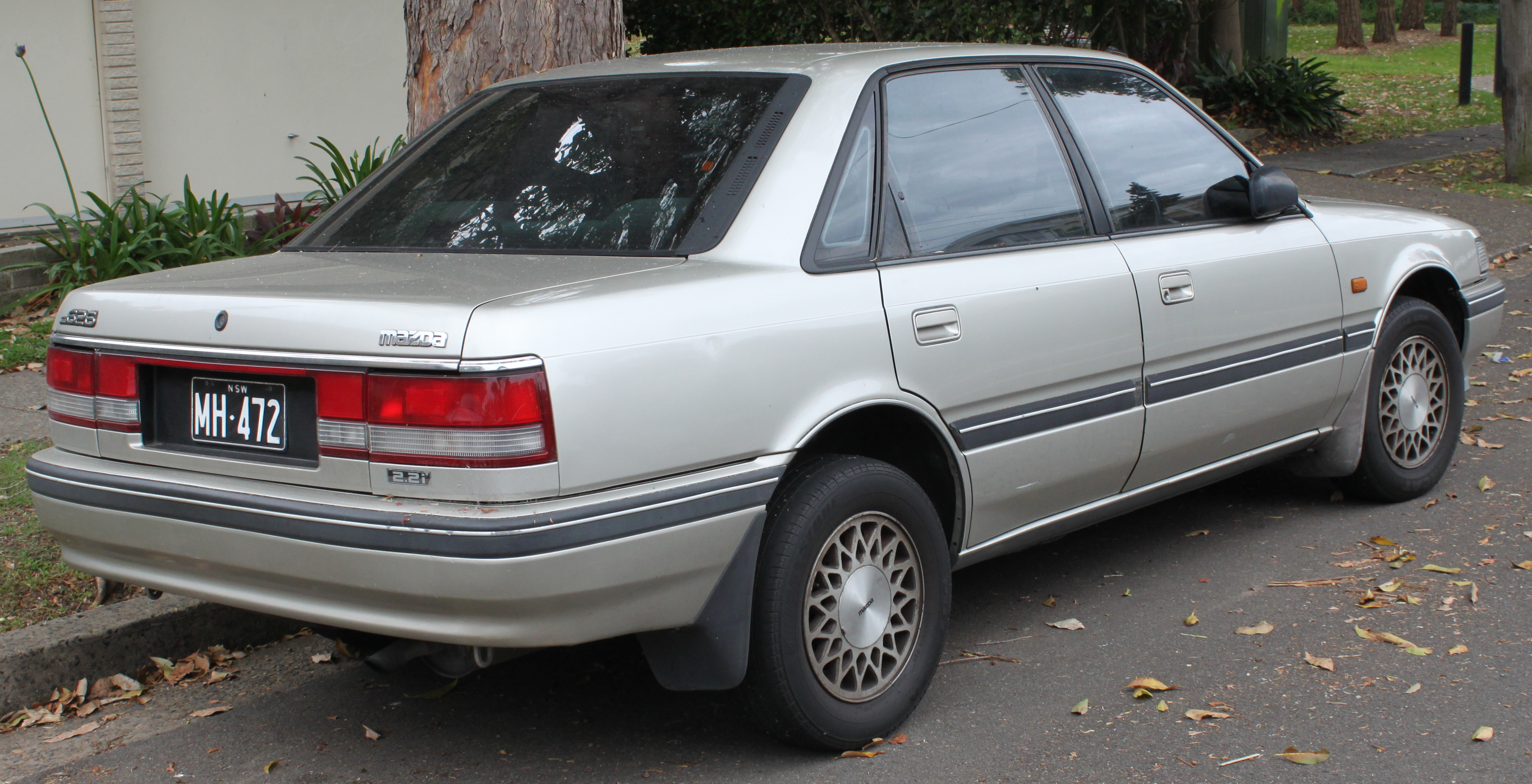
Sedan (facelift)

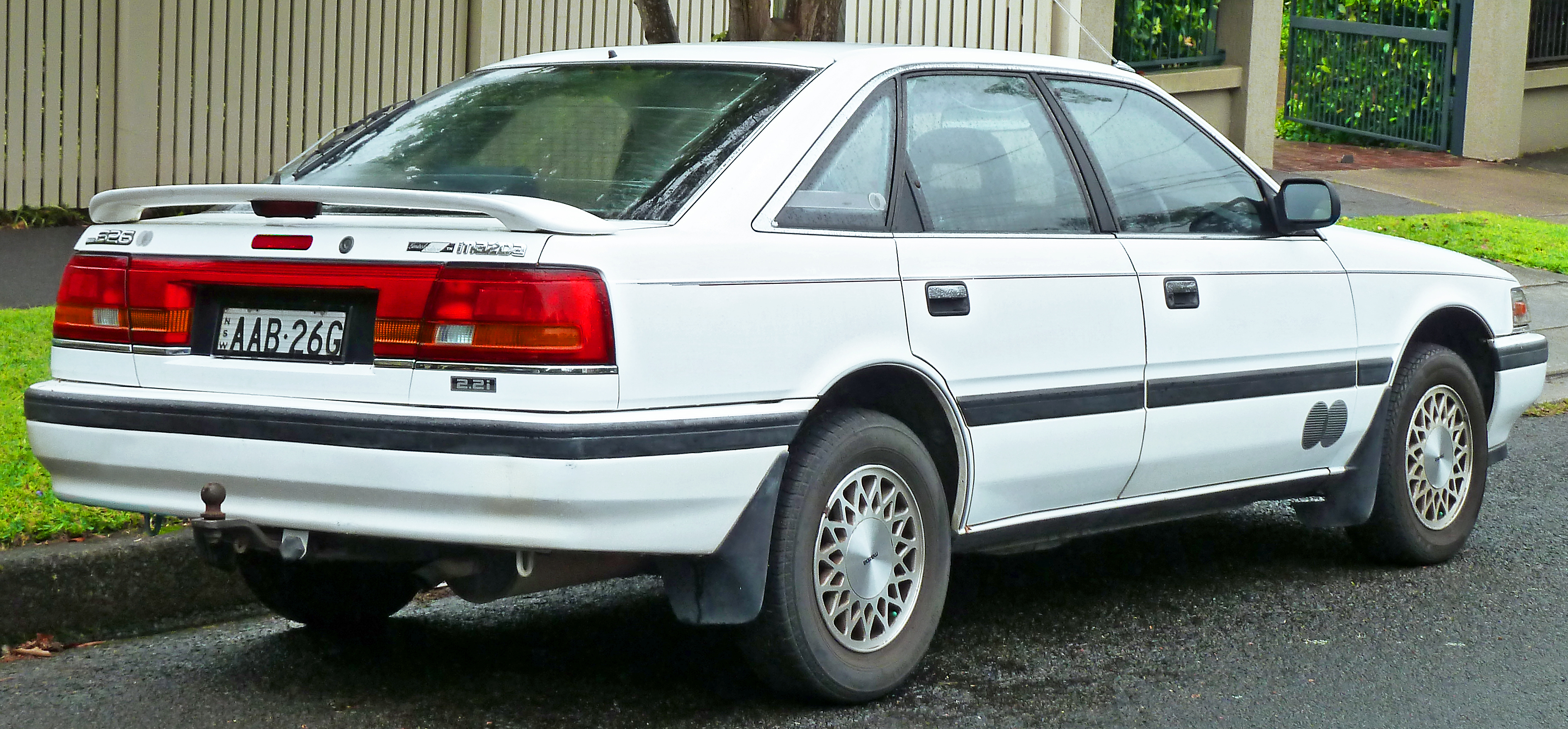
Hatchback (facelift)

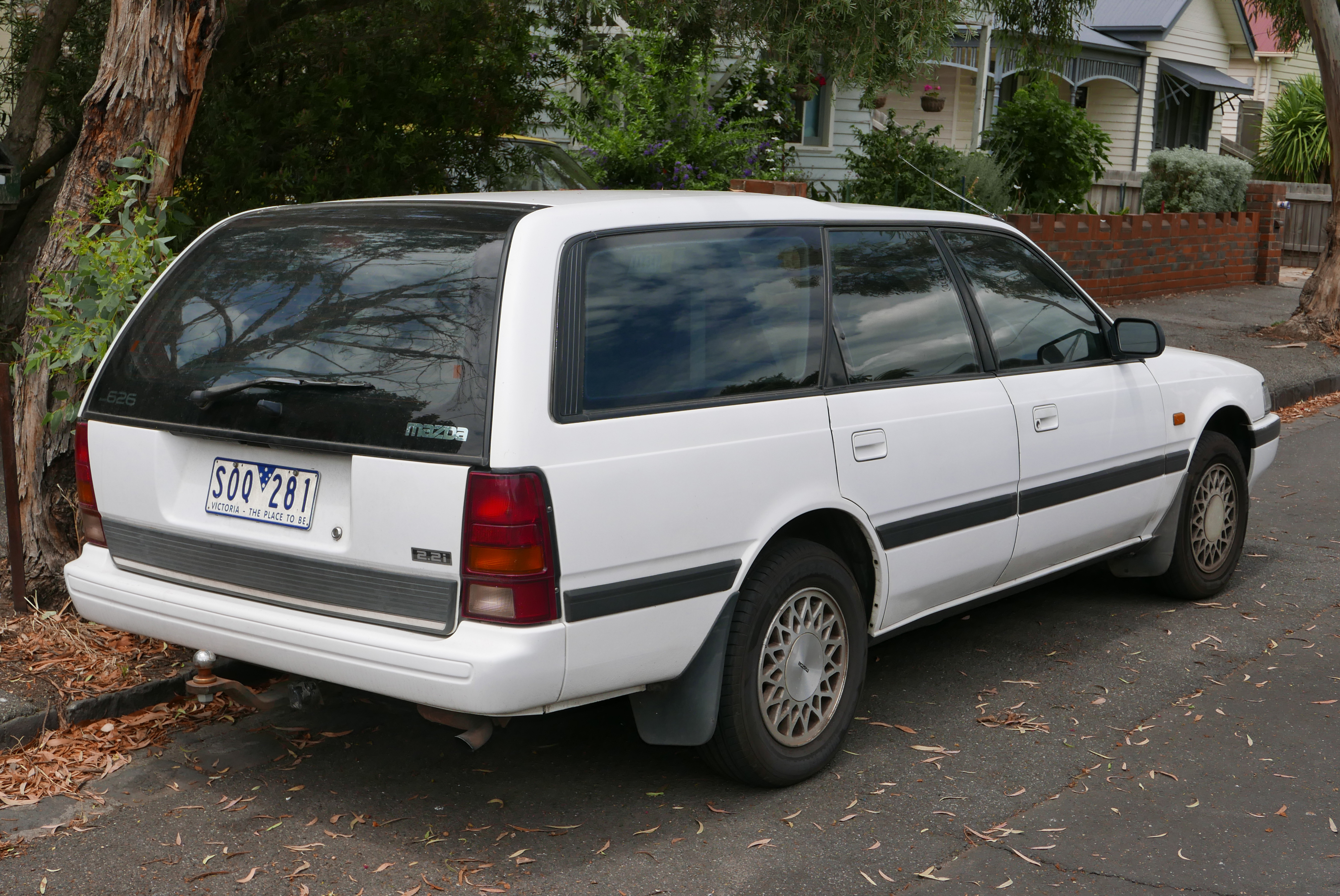
Wagon (facelift)

Model	Engine	Power	Torque	Fuel feed	Notes
1.6 8V	1587 cc F6 I4	81 PS (60 kW)	120 N⋅m (12.2 kg⋅m; 88.5 lb⋅ft)	carb	DIN, no cat
1.6 8V	1597 cc B6 I4	73 PS (54 kW)	122 N⋅m (12.4 kg⋅m; 90 lb⋅ft)	carb	JIS, Japan
1.8 8V	1789 cc F8 I4	90 PS (66 kW)	140 N⋅m (14.3 kg⋅m; 103 lb⋅ft)	carb	DIN, no cat
1.8 12V	1789 cc F8 I4	82 PS (60 kW); 97 PS (71 kW); 94 PS (69 kW)	133 N⋅m (13.6 kg⋅m; 98 lb⋅ft); 143 N⋅m (14.6 kg⋅m; 105 lb⋅ft); 141 N⋅m (14.4 kg⋅m; 104 lb⋅ft)	carb EGi carb	JIS, Japan; JIS, Japan; DIN, no cat, 1991 on
1.8 DOHC 16V	1789 cc F8 I4	115 PS (85 kW)	157 N⋅m (16.0 kg⋅m; 116 lb⋅ft)	EGi	JIS, Japan
2.0 8V	1998 cc FE I4	90 PS (66 kW); 102 PS (75 kW)	153 N⋅m (15.6 kg⋅m; 113 lb⋅ft); 156 N⋅m (15.9 kg⋅m; 115 lb⋅ft)	EGi carb	DIN, Europe; DIN, no cat
2.0 12V	1998 cc FE I4	109 PS (80 kW)	165 N⋅m (16.8 kg⋅m; 122 lb⋅ft)	carb	DIN, no cat
2.0 DOHC 16V	1998 cc FE-DOHC I4	140 PS (103 kW); 150 PS (110 kW); 145 PS (107 kW); 140 PS (103 kW); 148 PS (109 kW)	172 N⋅m (17.5 kg⋅m; 127 lb⋅ft); 184 N⋅m (18.8 kg⋅m; 136 lb⋅ft); 186 N⋅m (19.0 kg⋅m; 137 lb⋅ft); 173 N⋅m (17.6 kg⋅m; 128 lb⋅ft); 182 N⋅m (18.6 kg⋅m; 134 lb⋅ft)	EGi	JIS, early JIS; JIS, automatic DIN; DIN, no cat
2.2 12V	2184 cc F2 I4	115 PS (85 kW); 110 hp (82 kW)	180 N⋅m (18.4 kg⋅m; 133 lb⋅ft); 176 N⋅m; 18.0 kg⋅m (130 lb⋅ft)	EGi	DIN, Europe; SAE, North America
GT	2184 cc F2T I4 turbo	145 hp (108 kW)	258 N⋅m; 26.3 kg⋅m (190 lb⋅ft)	EGi	SAE, North America
2.0 Diesel	1998 cc RF diesel I4	61 PS (45 kW)	121 N⋅m (12.3 kg⋅m; 89 lb⋅ft); 119 N⋅m (12.1 kg⋅m; 88 lb⋅ft)	diesel	DIN, Europe; JIS, Capella Cargo (JDM)
2.0 D Comprex	1998 cc RF-CX Comprex D I4	82 PS (60 kW); 88 PS (65 kW)	181 N⋅m (18.5 kg⋅m; 133 lb⋅ft); 186 N⋅m (19.0 kg⋅m; 137 lb⋅ft)	diesel	JIS, Japan; JIS, Japan (Oct. 1995 on)

== Fifth generation (1992–1997) ==
=== International (GE; 1992–1997) ===
GE
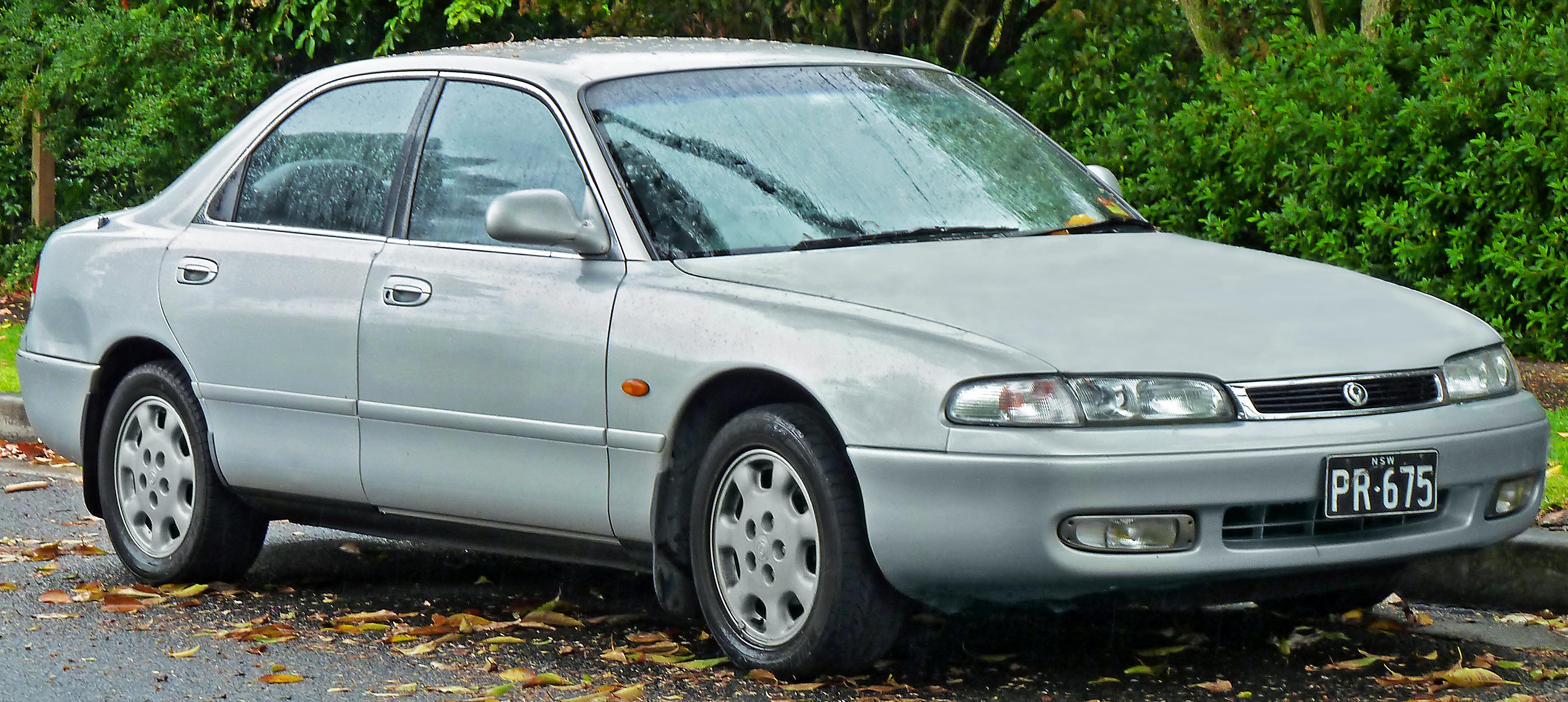
- 1993 Mazda 626 V6 sedan (pre facelift)

Overview
- Model code: GE
- Also called: Mazda 626; Mazda Cronos (Japan/Indonesia); Mazda 626 Cronos (Canada/Middle East) ɛ̃fini MS-6 (hatchback, Japan only); Ford Telstar; Autozam Clef
- Production: November 1991 – 1997
- Assembly: Japan: Hofu; Colombia: Bogotá; United States: Flat Rock, Michigan (AAI); Indonesia: Bekasi (PT. National Motors)
- Designer: Yasuo Aoyagi (1989)

Body and chassis
- Body style: 4-door sedan 5-door hatchback
- Layout: Transverse front-engine, front-wheel drive Transverse front-engine, four-wheel drive
- Related: Mazda Xedos 6; Mazda MX-6; Ford Probe; ɛ̃fini MS-8 (Japan only); Kia Credos

Powertrain
- Engine: 1.8 L FP I4; 2.0 L FS-DE I4; 2.0 L KF-ZE V6; 2.5 L KL-DE V6; 2.5 L KL-ZE V6; 2.0 L RFT Comprex diesel I4
- Transmission: 5-speed manual 4-speed automatic

Dimensions
- Wheelbase: 2,610 mm (102.8 in)
- Length: 4,670–4,695 mm (183.9–184.8 in) (sedan/hatchback)
- Width: 1,750 mm (68.9 in)
- Height: 1,400 mm (55.1 in)
- Curb weight: 1,180–1,340 kg (2,601–2,954 lb) (sedan/hatchback)

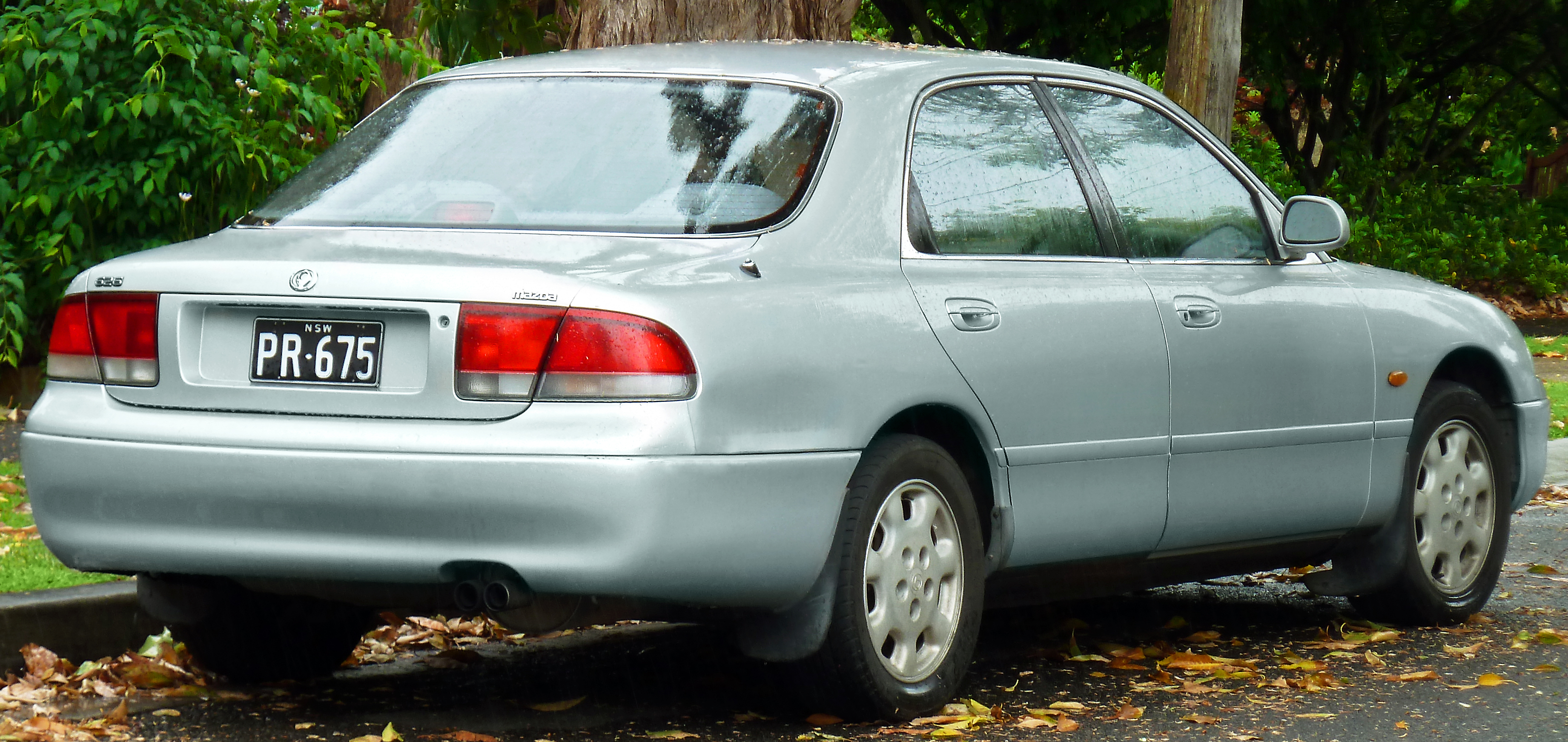
Sedan (pre-facelift)

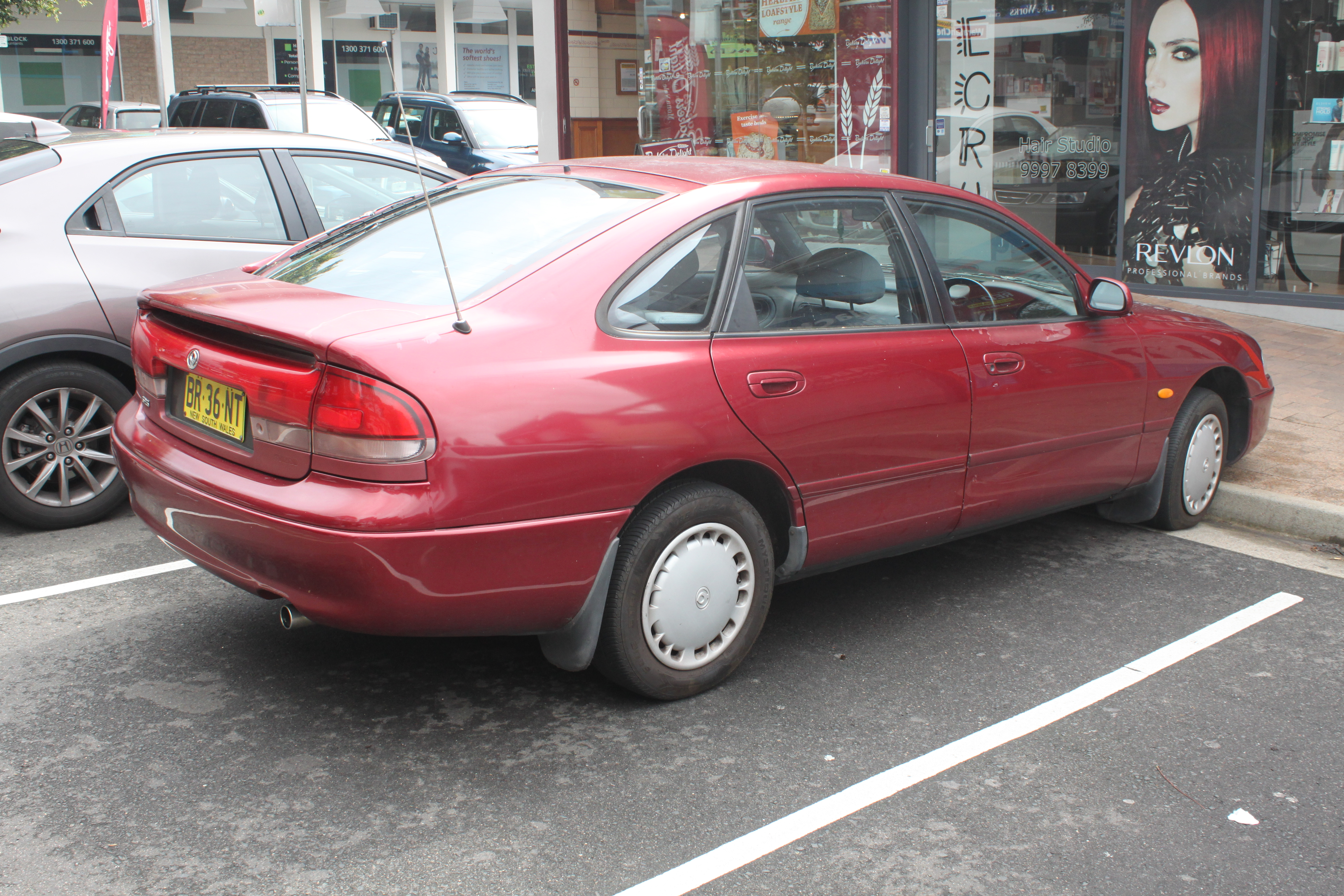
Hatchback (pre-facelift)

For the fifth generation, GE series sedan and hatchback, the Capella name was dropped—although export markets retained the 626 title. In this generation, there was no station wagon version in this line-up. Its nameplate replacements, the Mazda Cronos (sedan) and ɛ̃fini MS-6 (hatchback) that launched in November 1991 were pitched to Japanese customers instead. Both were slightly narrower than the export 626 saloons and hatchbacks to meet Japanese tax restrictions. Built on the GE platform, the hatchback-only MS-6 was launched under the ɛ̃fini brand, as a separate car from the sedan-only Cronos, as Mazda was at the beginning of an ambitious five-brand expansion plan of doubling sales. Including the badge-engineered Ford Telstar (sold at Japanese Ford dealerships called Autorama), the Mazda MX-6 coupe, and the Autozam Clef, a total of five cars were spawned off the same platform, launched under four different brands in Japan over a two-year period.

All of these models ended their production run prematurely, most likely due to the difficulties involved in promoting so many new nameplates as the Japanese economy began to feel the effects of the recession resulting from the Japanese asset price bubble from 1985 to 1991. While the MS-6 shared the Cronos GE platform, it was marketed as the more sporty of the two. The Capella badge lived on with the wagon/van versions on the previous GV series until 1999. Until 1989, Japanese car taxation used a car's width as a key determinant. The Cronos and its siblings all exceed the critical 1,700 mm (66.9 in) level in width. The series GE platform shared the same width dimension as the luxury brand ɛ̃fini MS-8 and ɛ̃fini MS-6, sharing the 2.5-litre V6. Moving in accord with early-1990s zeitgeist, Mazda considered width a key factor in the Cronos' sales failure, and proceeded to create a narrower stopgap model from the CG platform. This car was introduced in 1994 as the new CG series Capella sedan.

Export

Nonetheless, the GE Cronos and MS-6 continued to be sold as the Mazda 626 in nearly all export markets. European sales of the new 626 began in January 1992. The 626 was again Wheels magazine's Car of the Year for a second time in 1992.

The European (E-spec) and Asian (JDM) models had many differences versus the North American (A-spec) models. These include: raised turn signal side markers vs the A-Spec flush mounted side markers, small fog lights with silver bezels vs the A-Spec full fitting fog lights, different interior cloth patterns, projector headlamps (glass lenses), a 1.8-litre FP engine, and a hatchback model. Europe also received a diesel-engined version, using the "Comprex" pressure-wave supercharged RF engine seen in the previous generation JDM Capella. Power in Europe is 75 PS (55 kW) ECE at 4000 rpm, while the Japanese model claims 82 PS (60 kW) JIS at the same engine speed. European models were also available in a model with four-wheel steering until a mid-1994 lineup adjustment. This was only offered in the hatchback with the 2.5-litre V6 and a manual transmission and not many were sold.

For the first time for a Mazda, the 626 began manufacturing in the US at Flat Rock, Michigan on 1 September 1992 for the 1993 model year. The car was originally known as the "626 Cronos" in Canada, but dropped the Cronos for the 1996 model year. Mazda's 2.5-litre V6 engine debuted to rave reviews. Though the 626's manual transmission was highly regarded, U.S.-built four-cylinder 626s from 1994 onwards used the widely used Ford CD4E automatic transmission (designated by Mazda as LA4A-EL), which replaced the 1993 model's Japanese sourced transmission, which continued on in the V6 model. The CD4E was manufactured in Batavia, Ohio under ZF Batavia, a joint venture between Ford and ZF Friedrichshafen AG. In service in the Mazda 626, the transmission was reputed to have a higher failure rate than in other applications. It is widely known to transmission specialists that the CD4E overheats due to a poorly designed valve body and torque converter. Mazda issued relevant Technical Service Bulletins (0400502, 01598, 003/97K, 006/95) regarding the transmission and torque converter. The CD4E was produced until 2008 at Batavia and was never officially recalled in any application. In 1994, a passenger side airbag was added, whilst some models of the 1994 and 1995 Mazda 626 2.0L automatics were outfitted with Ford's EEC-IV diagnostic system. In North America, the V6 spread to the LX trim in addition to the leather ES trim. New for 1996 and 1997 models were a redesigned hood (raised centre portion), chrome grille fairing (attached to the hood), and the introduction of the on Board Diagnostics II revision (OBD-II).

In Colombia the car was named 626 Matsuri (Japanese for "holiday") to differentiate from the past version that was sold at the same time.

Mazda New Zealand assembled this generation for four years with few changes. Ford's variants (since 1987 all built in the same Ford-Mazda joint venture Vehicle Assemblers of New Zealand (VANZ) factory in Wiri, South Auckland) had minor styling and equipment differences (the top Telstar hatchback had an electric sunroof) and anti-lock brakes were now standard on some models, for which factory engineers had to build a special test rig at the end of the assembly line. These were also the first 626/Telstar models to have factory fitted air conditioning, though only standard on the top Limited (626) and TX5 XRi (Telstar) five-door hatchbacks.

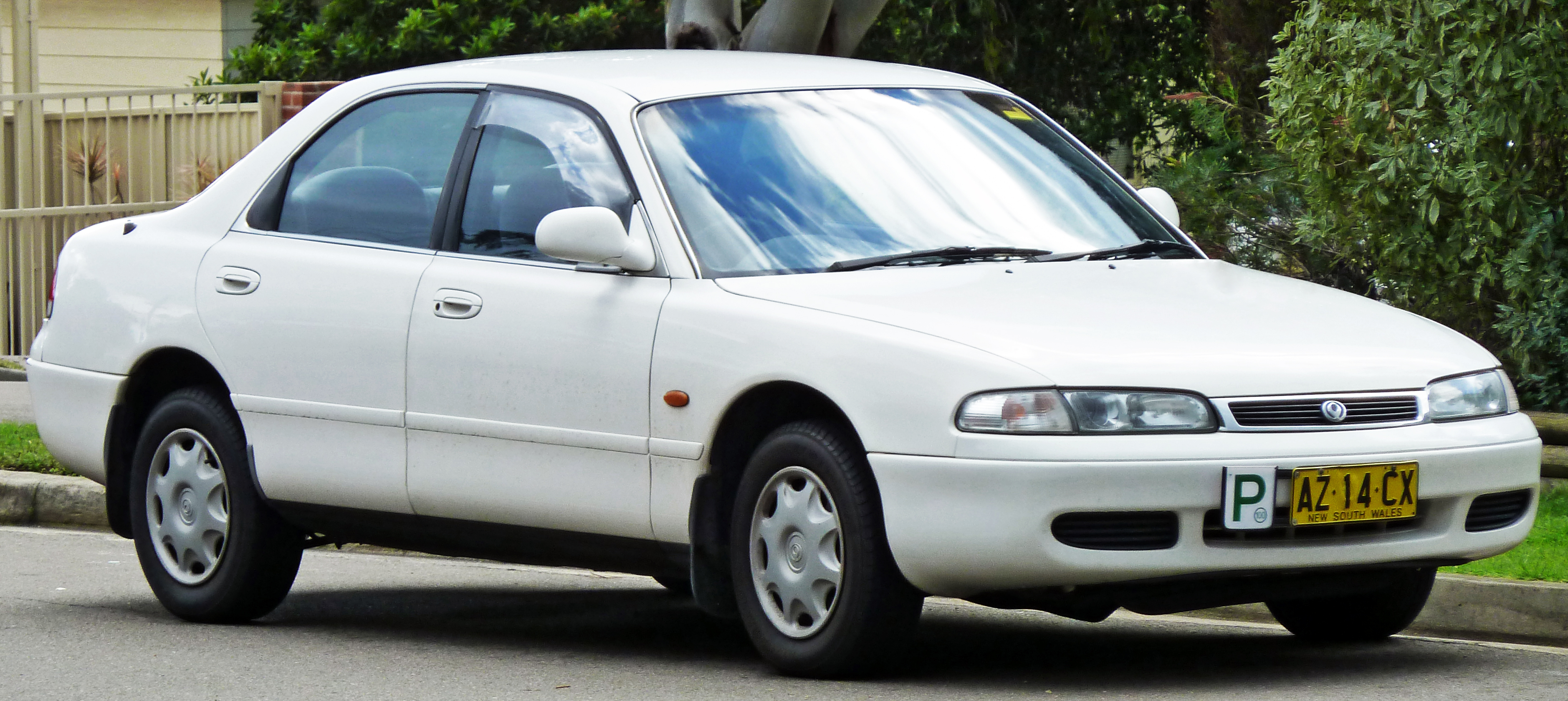
Sedan (facelift)

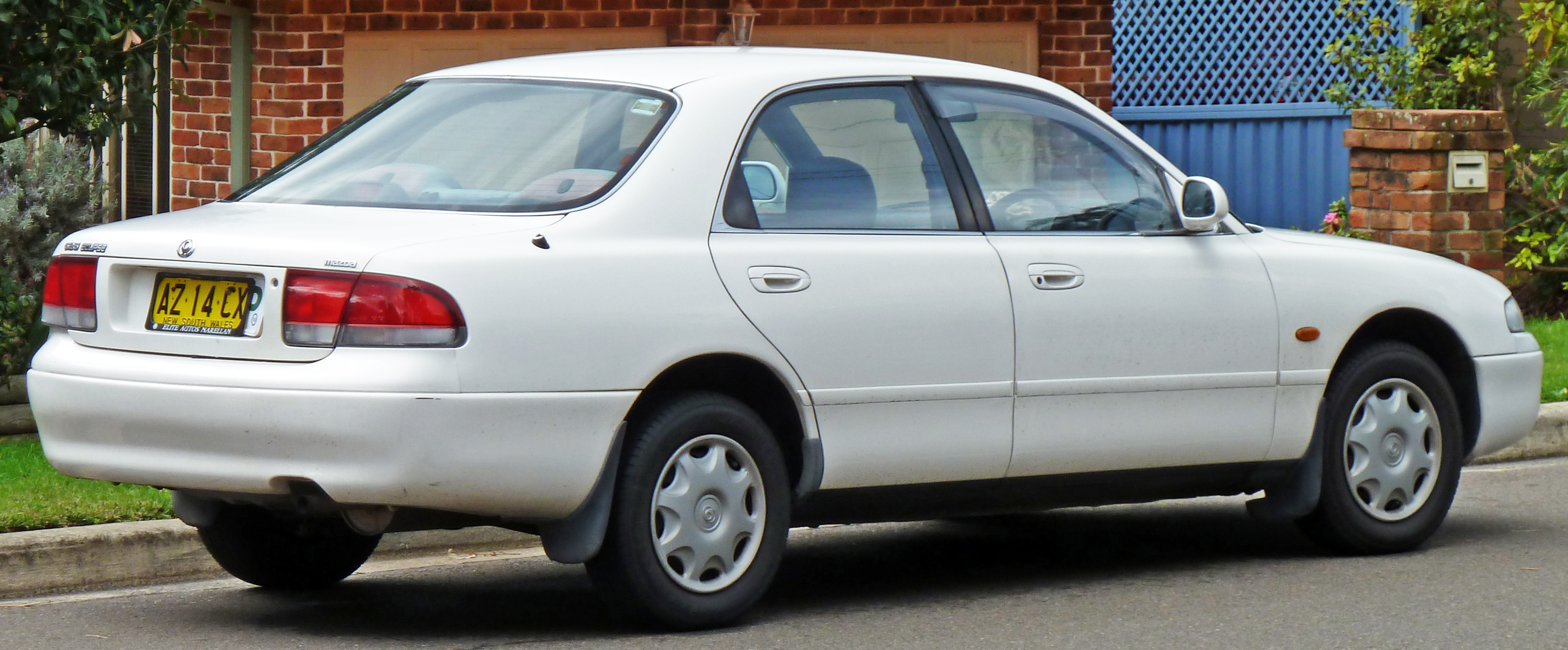
Sedan (facelift)

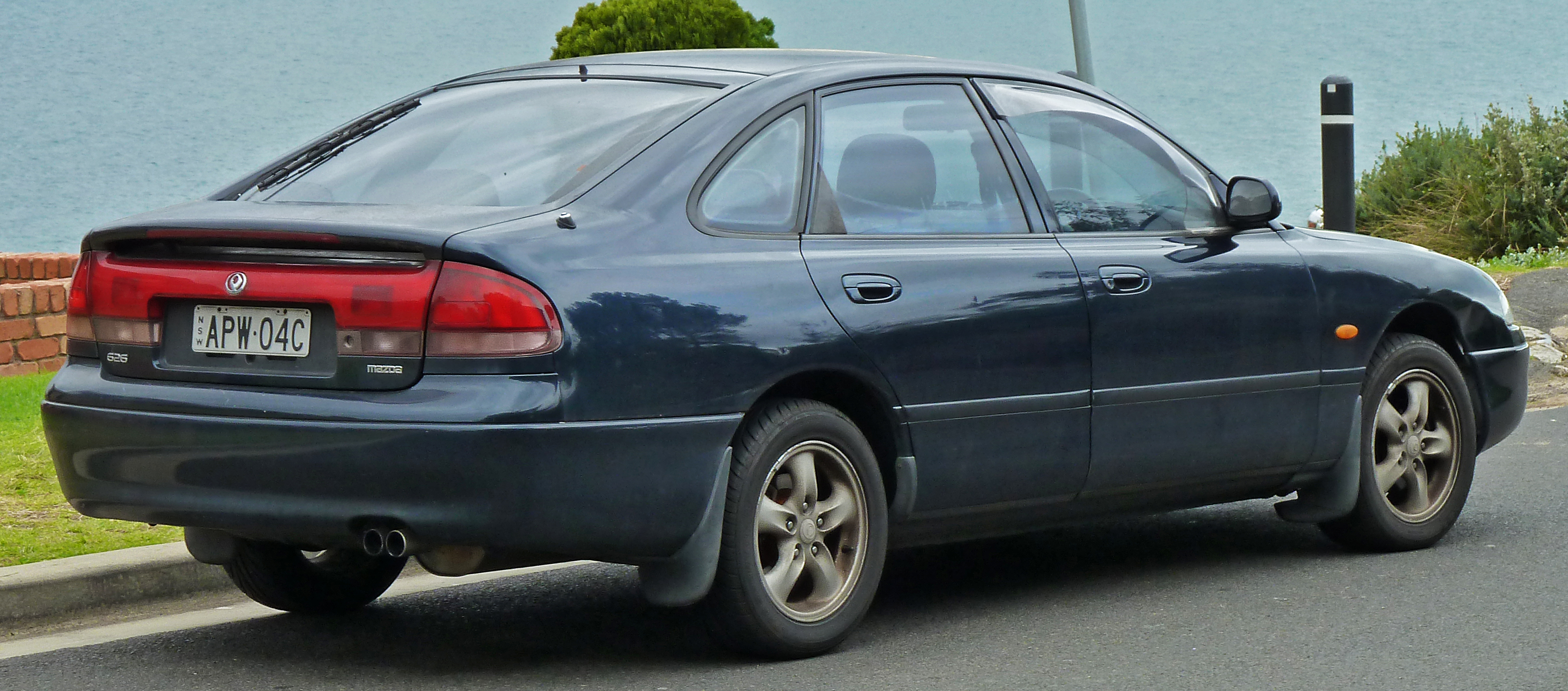
Hatchback (facelift)

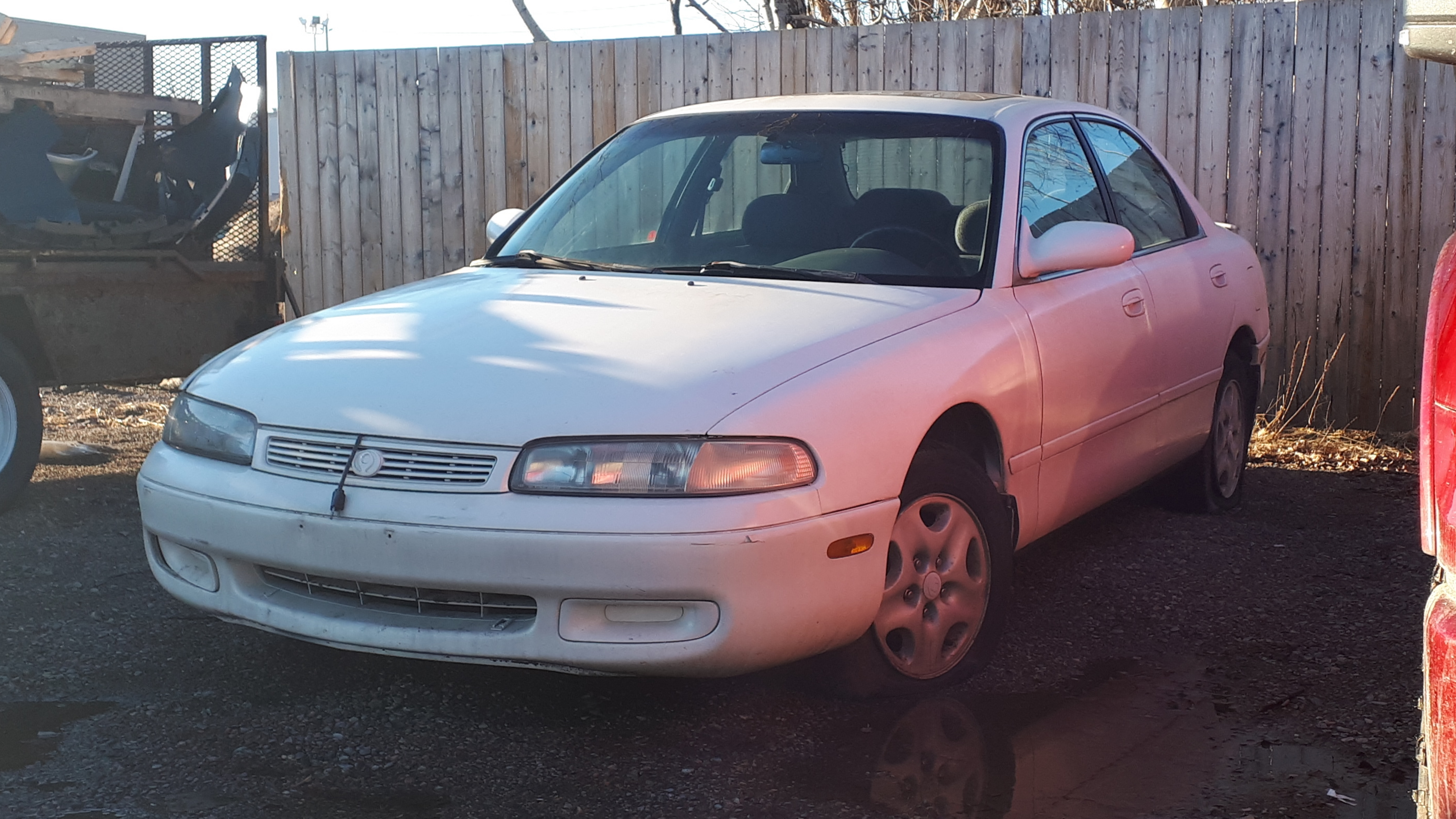
Mazda 626 Cronos (Canada)

Model	Years	Engine	Power	Torque	Notes
1.8	1992–1997	1840 cc FP I4	105 PS (77 kW; 104 hp)	154 N⋅m (114 lb⋅ft)	Europe
2.0	1992–1997; 1993–1997	1991 cc FS I4	115 PS (85 kW; 113 hp); 118 hp (88 kW; 120 PS)	170 N⋅m (125 lb⋅ft); 172 N⋅m (127 lb⋅ft)	Europe; North America (base)
2.5 V6	1992–1997; 1993–1997	2497 cc KL V6	165 PS (121 kW; 163 hp); 164 hp (122 kW; 166 PS)	217 N⋅m (160 lb⋅ft); 217 N⋅m (160 lb⋅ft)	Europe; North America

=== Japan (CG; 1994–1997) ===
CG
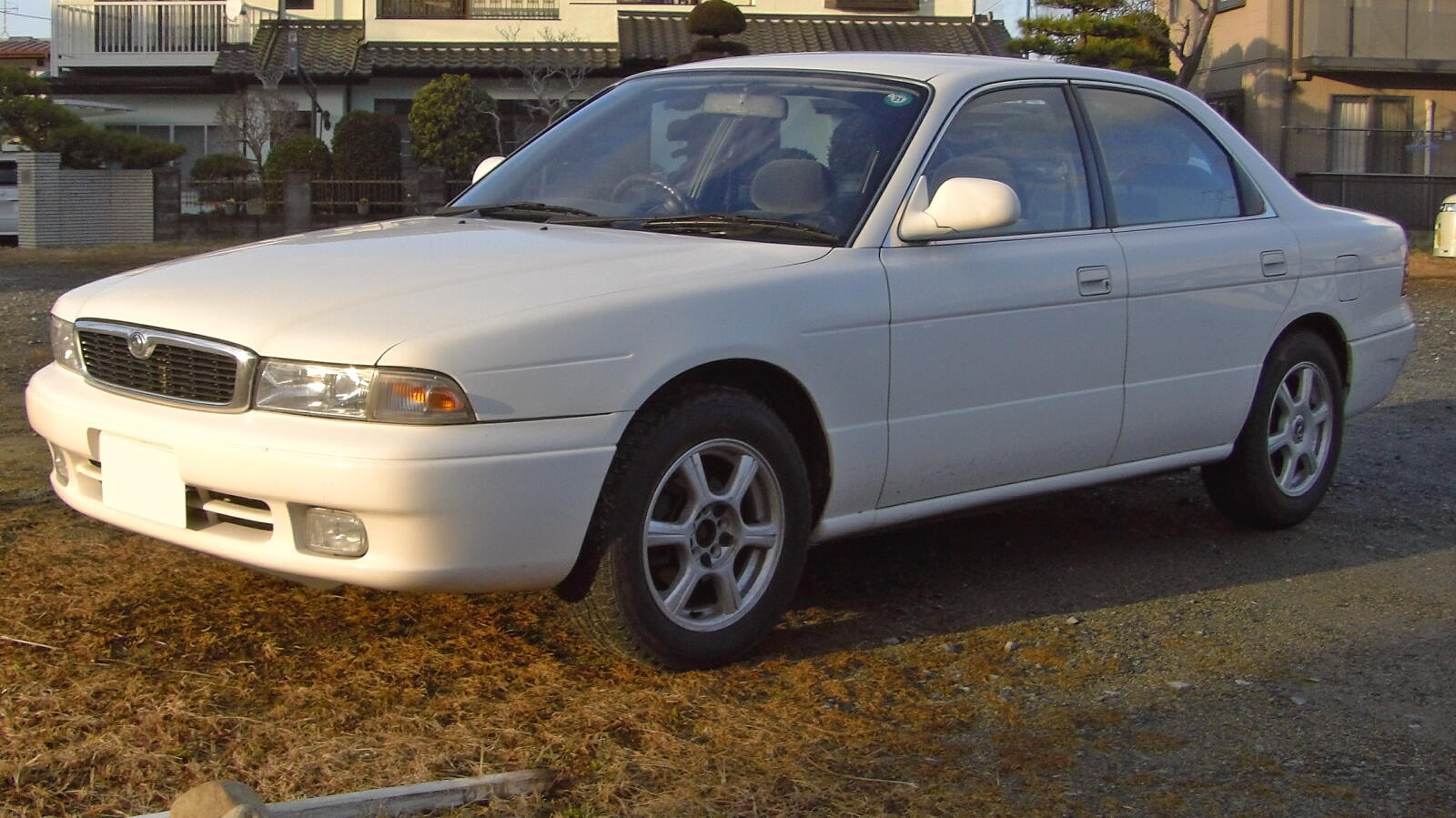

Overview
- Model code: CG
- Also called: Ford Telstar II
- Production: 1994–1997
- Assembly: Japan: Hofu

Body and chassis
- Body style: 4-door sedan
- Layout: Transverse front-engine, front-wheel drive Transverse front-engine, four-wheel drive

Powertrain
- Engine: 1.8 L FP I4; 2.0 L FS I4
- Transmission: 5-speed manual 4-speed automatic

Dimensions
- Wheelbase: 2,610 mm (102.8 in)
- Length: 4,595 mm (180.9 in)
- Width: 1,695 mm (66.7 in)
- Height: 1,395 mm (54.9 in)

Since 1991, the Capella label had only been used for the lingering GV series wagon and van as a result of Mazda's attempt at brand diversification. This changed when the new, more compact CG series Capella launched in August 1994. It was built on the CG platform designed for the upscale Mazda Lantis and Eunos 500. This vehicle lasted only until 1997, and the Capella name returned to the G platform at this time. Available only with a four-door saloon bodywork, it received 1.8- or 2.0-litre inline-four engines.

The slightly reduced width dimension of this series was due to the fact that the Japanese Government taxes exterior dimensions and engine displacement that exceed regulations. This factor is a key component in all vehicles sold in Japan, and this generation vehicle was introduced so as to encourage sales of the Capella against rival Japanese products.

Another factor was that Japan was entering an economic recession due to the effects of the "bubble economy", and all Japanese industries were experiencing a decline in manufactured products.

The sporting models of previous Capellas were now sold under other nameplates, and the CG received 115 PS (85 kW) in 1.8 form and 125 PS (92 kW) in the 2.0-litre. Four-wheel drive was available with the larger engine only. Equipment levels were Li-S, Li, and Gi for the 1.8. The 2.0 was sold as the Zi or as the Fi when equipped with four-wheel drive. In August 1997, the Capella was replaced by the new GF model, which was the same as the 626 outside of North America.

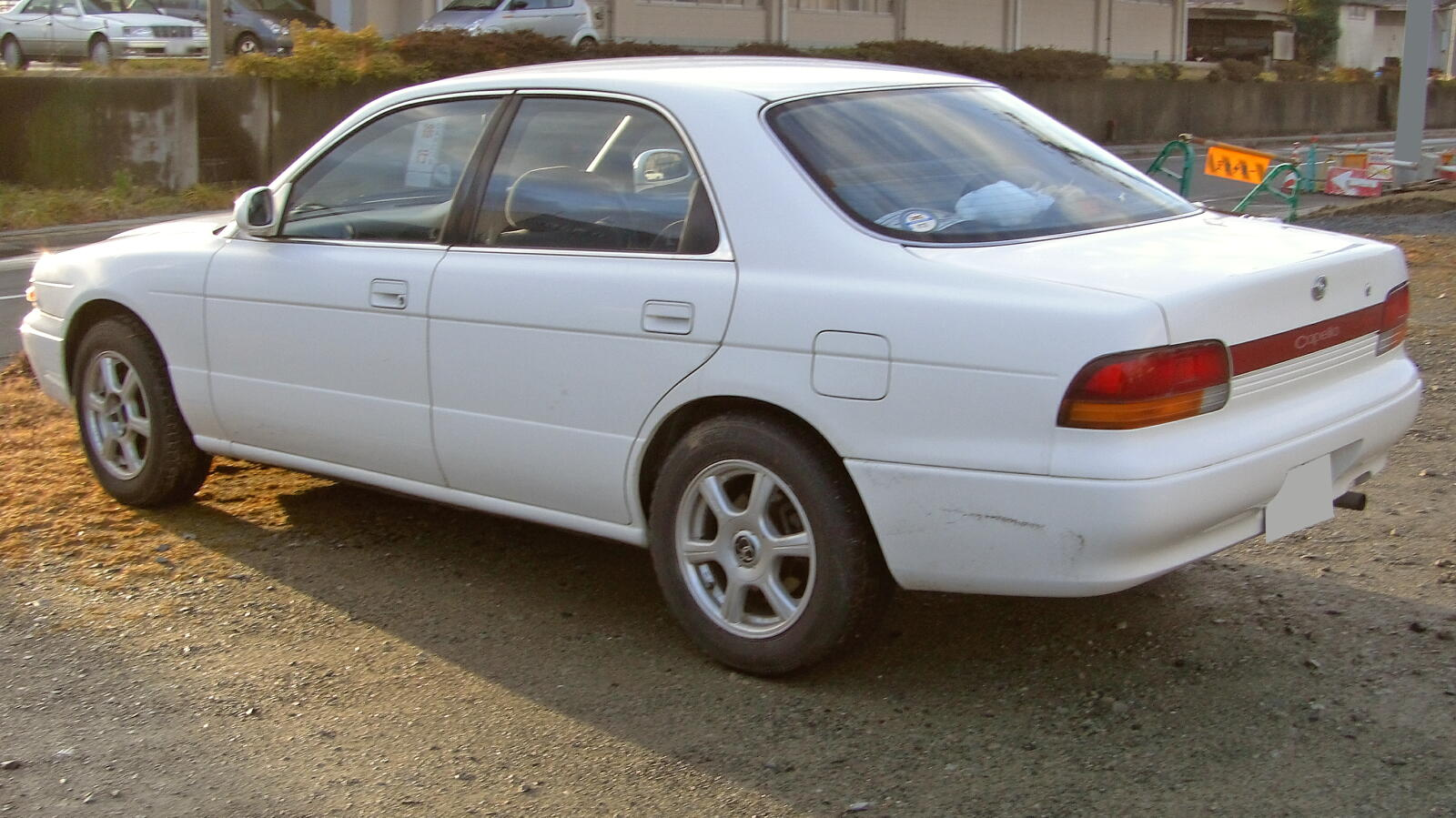
1994 Mazda Capella (CG; Japan)

== Sixth generation (1997–2002) ==
=== International (GF, GW; 1997–2002) ===
GF, GW
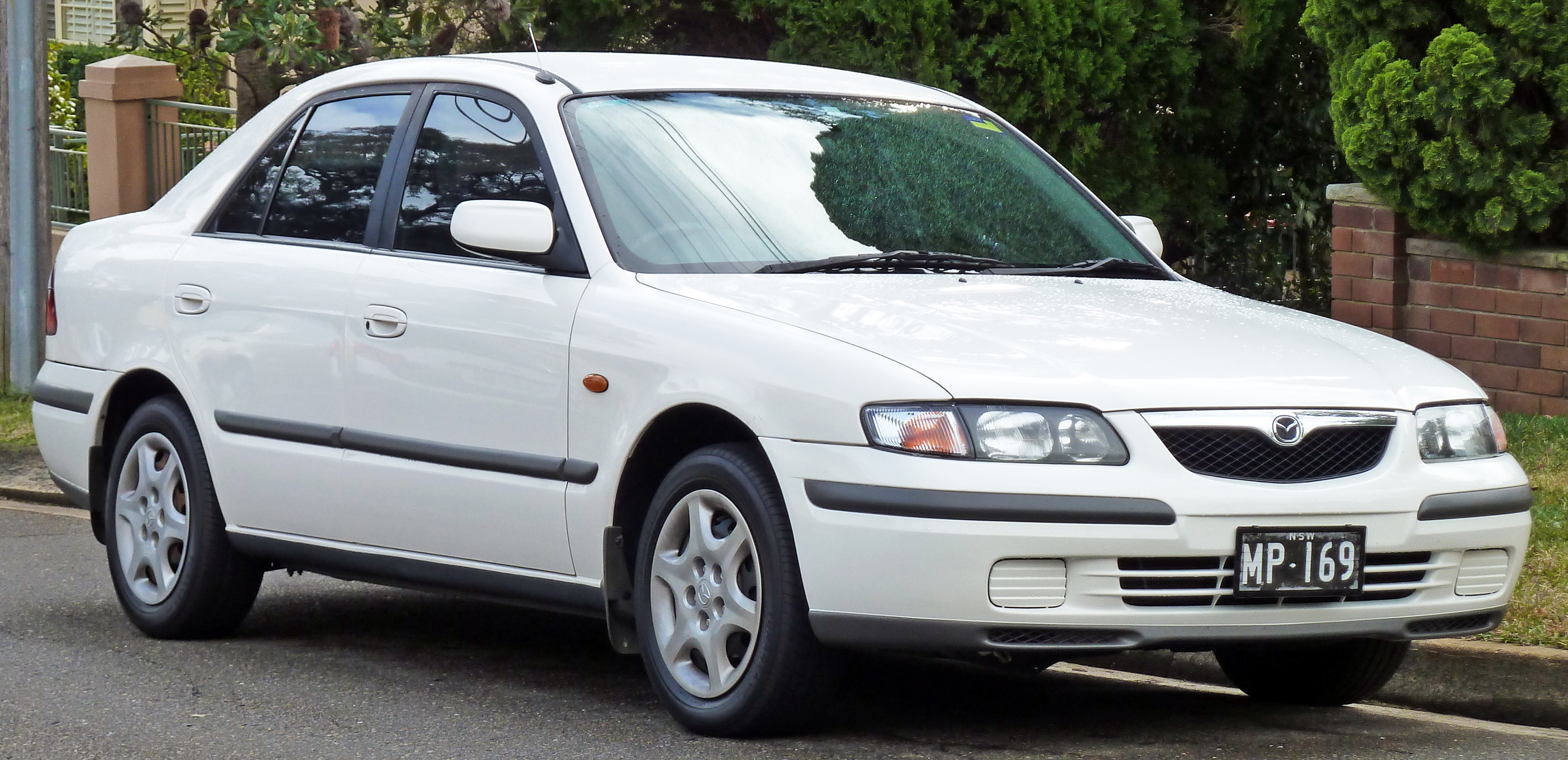

Overview
- Model code: GF / GW
- Also called: Mazda 626; Ford Telstar
- Production: 1997–2002 (until 2006 in Colombia)
- Assembly: Japan: Hofu; Colombia: Bogotá; United States: Flat Rock, Michigan (AAI); Zimbabwe: Willowvale (WMMI)

Body and chassis
- Body style: 4-door sedan 5-door hatchback 5-door station wagon
- Layout: Transverse front-engine, front-wheel drive Transverse front-engine, four-wheel drive

Powertrain
- Engine: 1.8 L FP I4 (Europe); 2.0 L FS-DE I4; 2.5 L KL-G4, KL-ZE V6; 2.0 L RF-T I4 (turbo-diesel)
- Transmission: 5-speed manual 4-speed automatic

Dimensions
- Wheelbase: 2,670 mm (105.1 in)
- Length: 4,575 mm (180.1 in); 4,660 mm (183.5 in) (wagon); 4,740 mm (186.8 in) (US, 1998–99); 4,760 mm (187.4 in) (US, 2000–02)
- Width: 1,760 mm (69.3 in) (Int'l); 1,695 mm (66.7 in) (Japan)
- Height: 1,400 mm (55.1 in)

1997 brought the sixth-generation Capella, now on the GF platform. The Mazda Cronos name was retired and the Capella, 626, and Telstar once again shared a common platform. All-wheel drive was optional in Japan. The hatchback, a popular variant in Australasia and Europe, was not sold in Japan. North American 626's were again built by AutoAlliance International in Flat Rock, Michigan, and had an entirely different body and differing engine options from 626's sold in the rest of the world. Beside sedan and hatchback styles, the station wagon style was returned in the generation. Once again, the station wagon version used a slightly modified, carryover platform (now called GW, released in 1998). The wheelbase was 60 mm (2.4 in) longer than the sedan, and a V6 engine was offered. This time though, the bodywork was the same, minimizing confusion for buyers.

By now, Ford had decided to reintroduce European models in Australasia so the Mondeo replaced the Telstar in most markets though the latter was still sold in Japan. The Capella was lightly updated in 1999 with a new interior and exterior, cabin air filtration, an available turbo-diesel engine, a new Activematic manually operated automatic transmission, and available EBD and DSC.

The Mazda 626 GLX is a European and Asian only trim level of the Mazda 626 not produced or sold in North America. It is Japanese-made, with a 2.0-litre four-cylinder DOHC-engine (FS) and a four-speed automatic transmission, which produces 125 hp (93 kW) at 6,000 rpm and 133 lb·ft (180 N·m) at 4,000 rpm. The 2.0-litre turbo-diesel version was added to European market versions beginning in fall of 1998. The European trim levels are LXI, GXI, GSI, GXI SPORT, Atlantis, GXI SE, GSI SE. The European 626 was available with two different 2.0 engines, a 115 PS engine was available from 1998 to 2002 in all models except for the GSI SE and Sport models, which have the 136 PS FS engine.

In 2000, Mazda built the 626 MPS (Mazda Performance Series) concept sedan model. It debuted at the 2000 Geneva Motor Show as a concept car and only a few were ever produced. It would have included a new 2.5L 280 horsepower twin turbo redesign of the KL-ZE engine mated with a 5-speed manual transmission. However, the 626 MPS was never realized as the next generation of the 626, with the Mazda 6 MPS being introduced instead.

Model	Engine	Power	Torque	Notes
1.8	1,839 cc FP-DE I4	90 PS (66 kW; 89 hp)	145 N⋅m (107 lb⋅ft)	
2.0	1,991 cc FS I4	115 PS (85 kW; 113 hp)		Europe
2.0	1,991 cc FS-DE I4	136 PS (100 kW; 134 hp)		GSI SE, Sport (Europe)
2.5 V6	2,496 cc KL-ZE V6			JDM, wagon only
2.0 TD	1,998 cc RF-T TD I4	101 PS (74 kW; 100 hp)	220 N⋅m (162 lb⋅ft)	Europe, from fall 1998

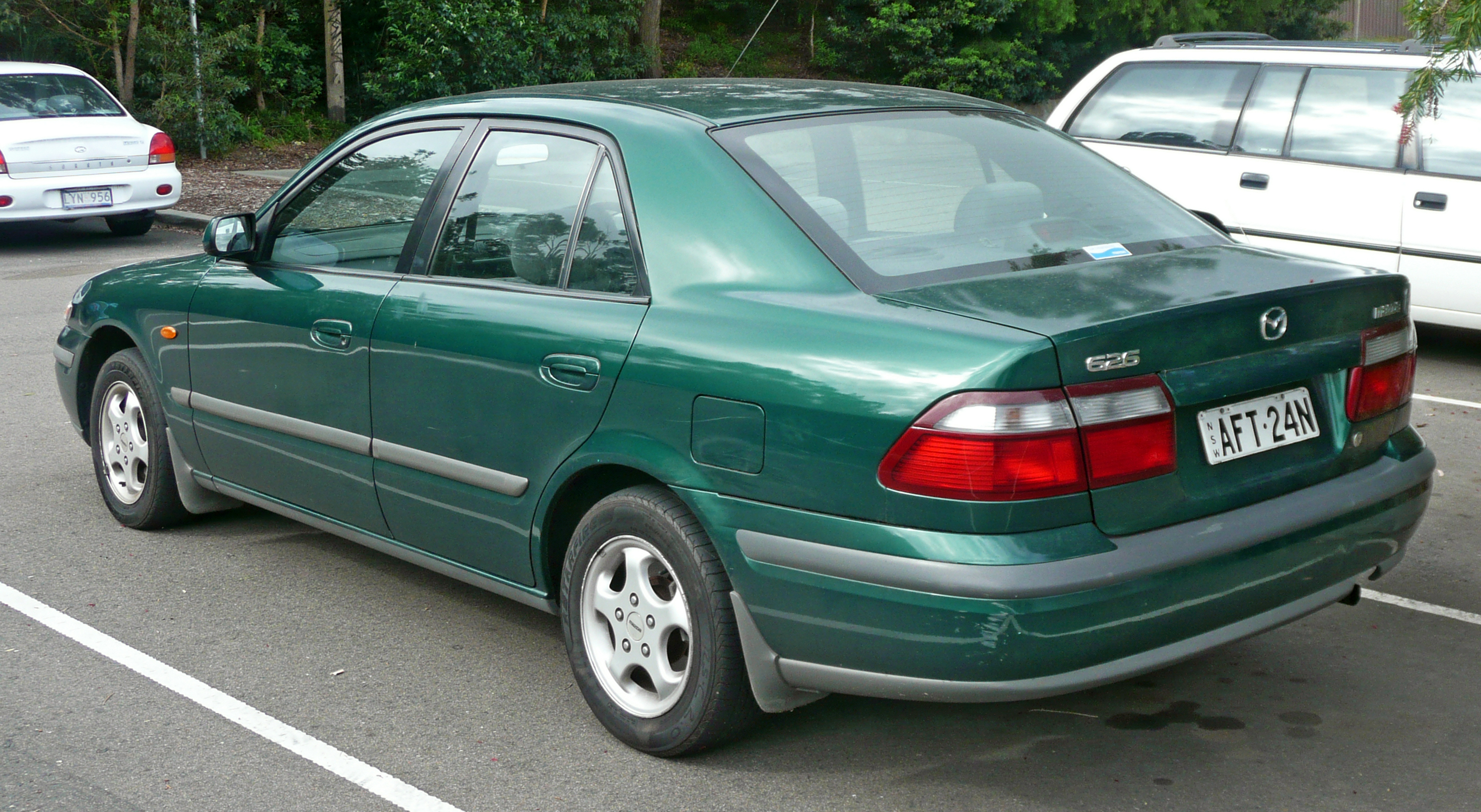
Sedan (pre-facelift)

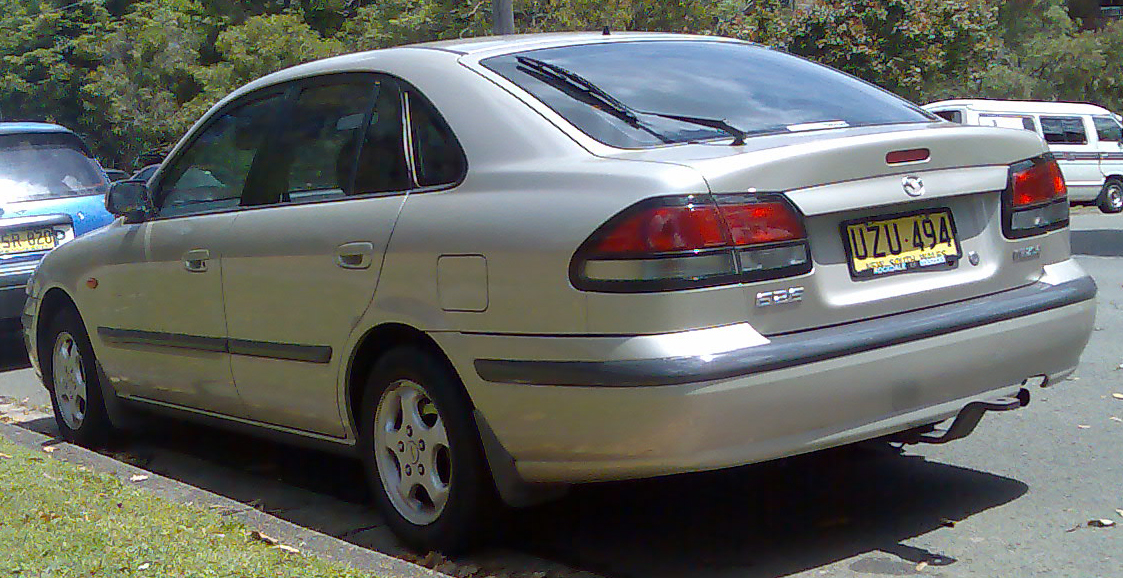
Hatchback (pre-facelift)

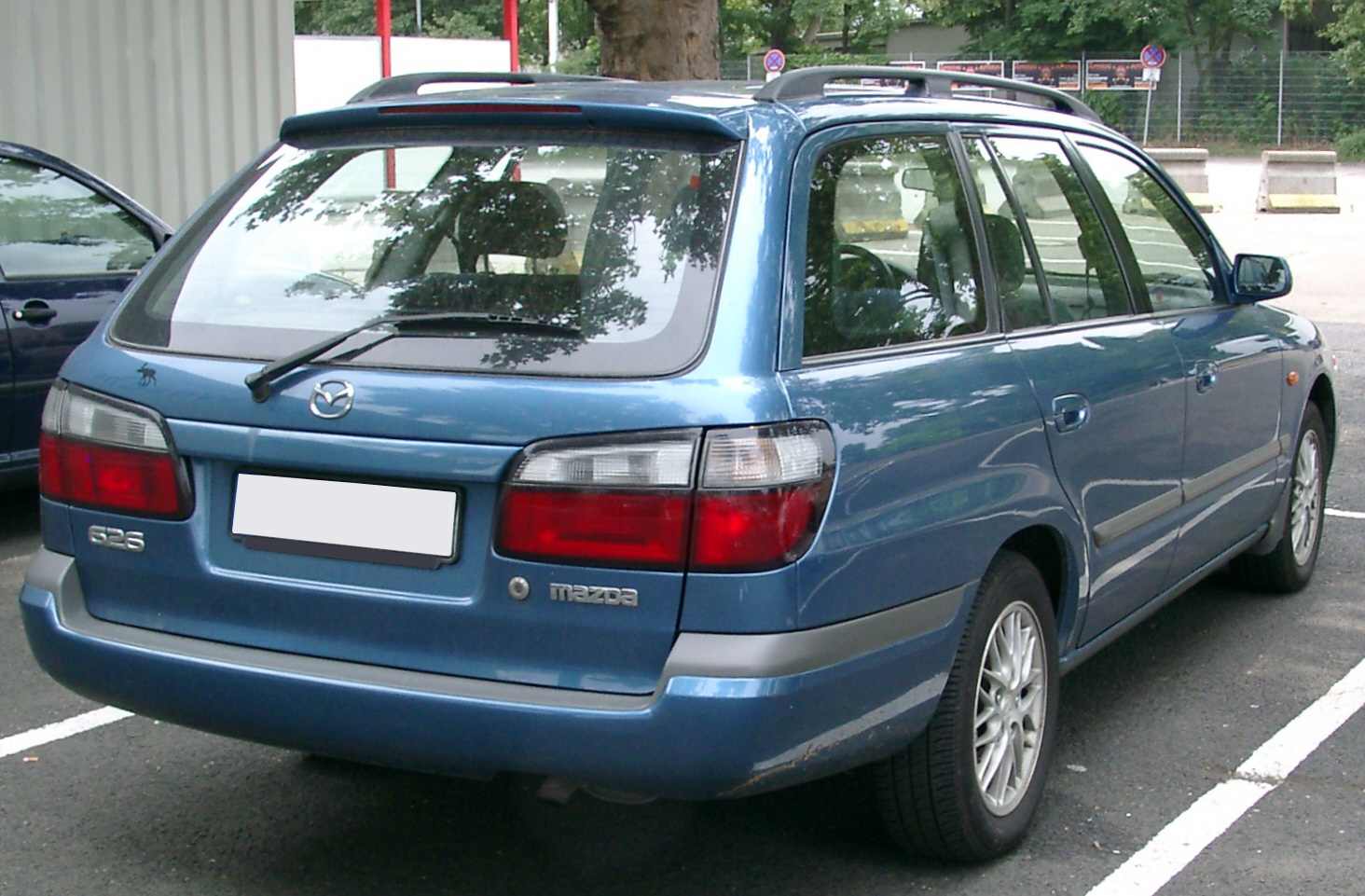
Wagon (pre-facelift)

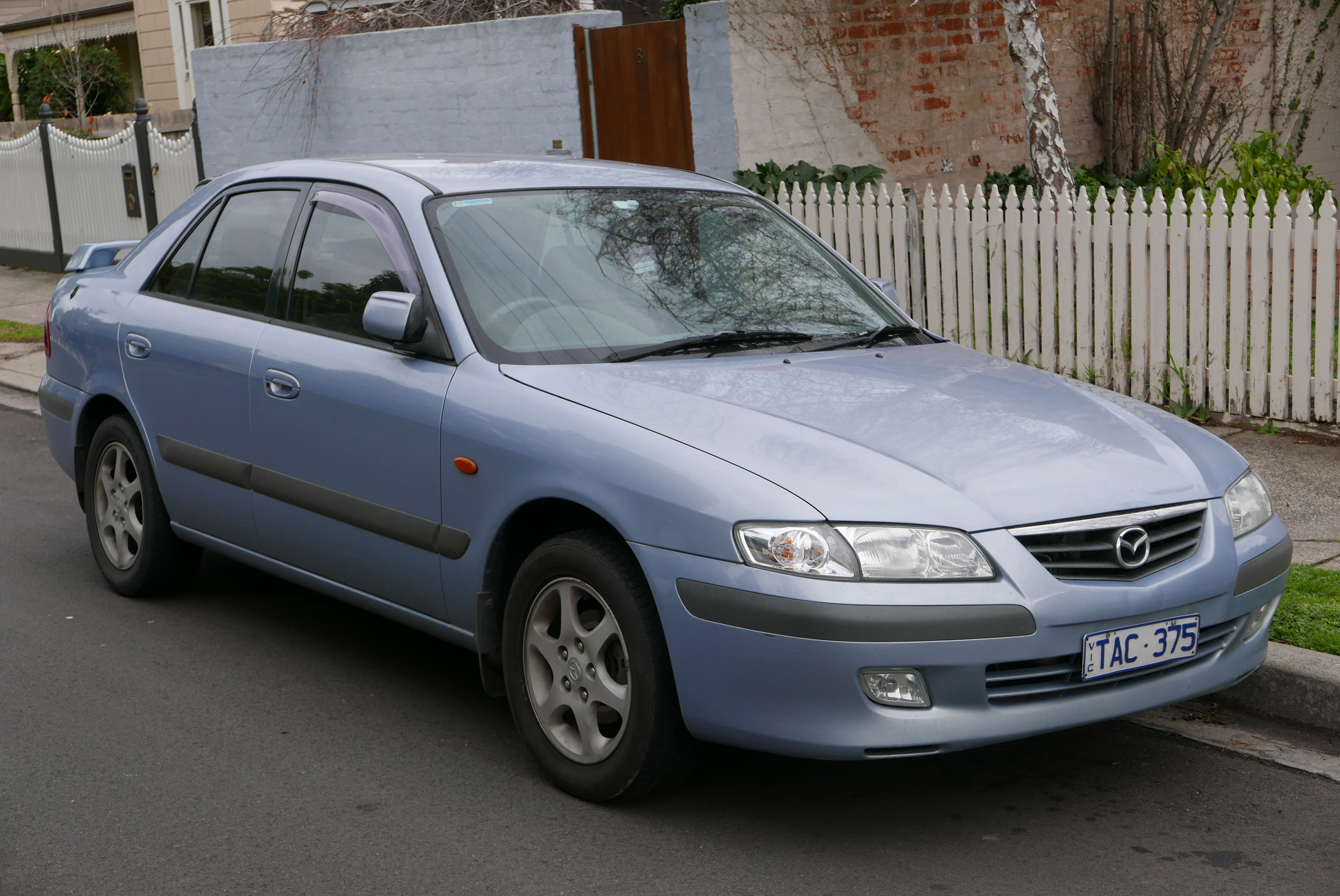
Sedan (facelift)

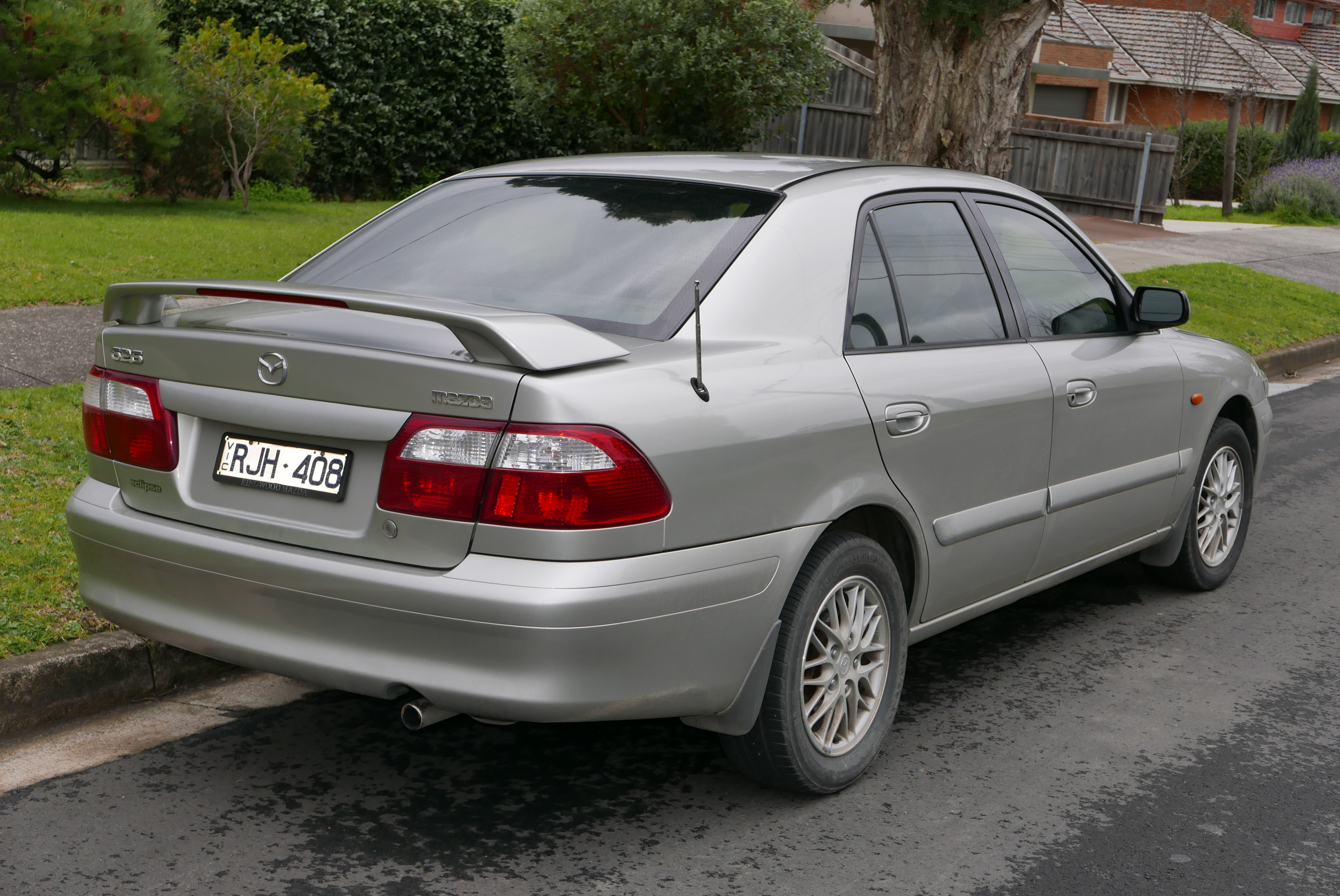
Sedan (facelift)

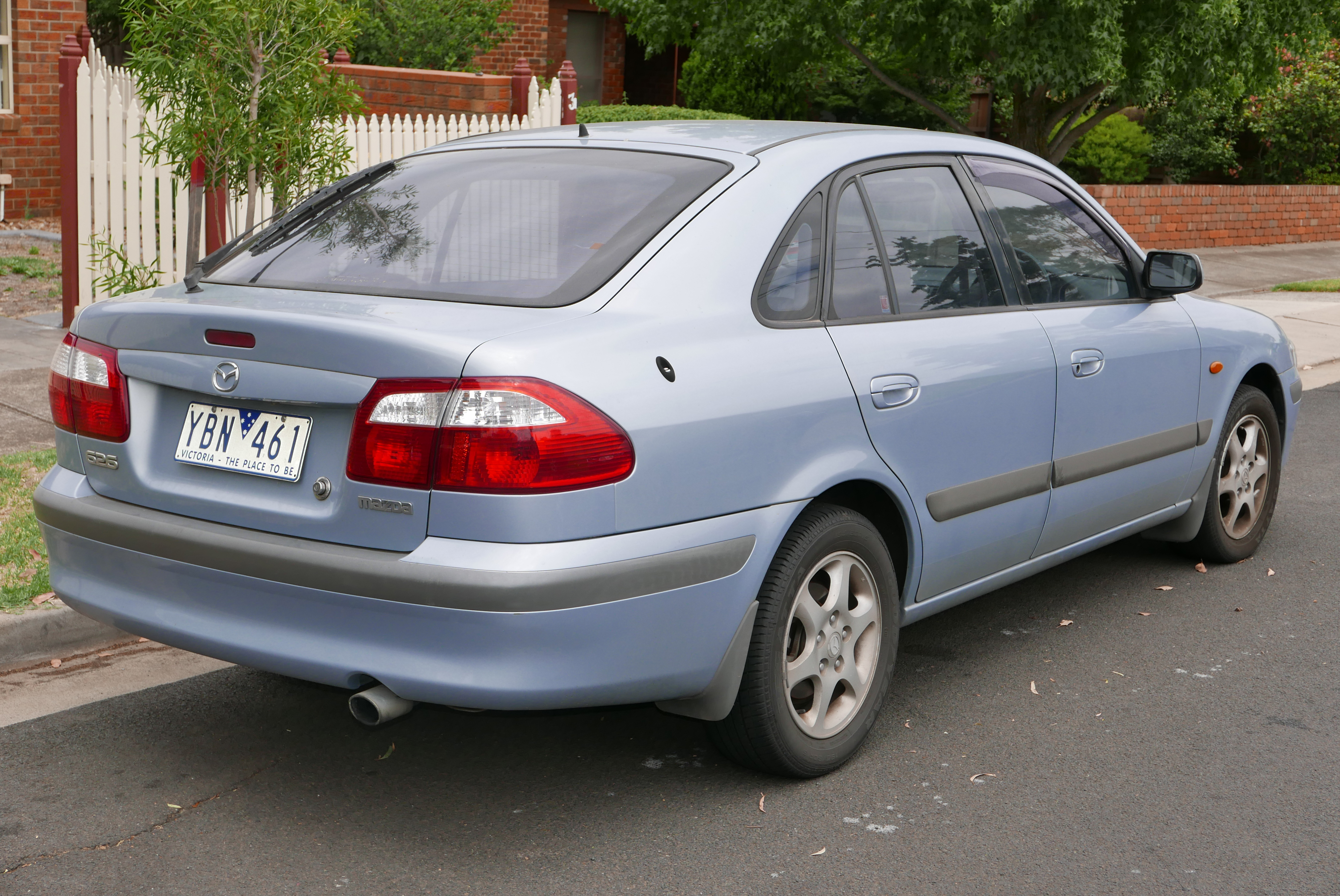
Hatchback (facelift)

=== North America (1997–2002) ===
The North American market 626, introduced in 1997 for the 1998 model year was different from those sold in other countries. The Michigan-built 626 resembled its predecessor, lacking the aggression which could be seen in the 626/Capella as built for the rest of the world. It was also considerably larger and heavier. LX and ES models were available, with both 2.0L and 2.5L V6 engines. Unusual amongst its competitors, the V6 was available with a manual transmission.

From 1998 through 1999 the 626 was given an engine overhaul to give it better pedal feel. However, as most car reviews attested, it is a bland vehicle with softer handling and fewer features than the 1993–1997 version. One such quote from Edmunds described it as "a bland, bread-and-butter sedan that's not big enough for families and not sporty enough for enthusiasts." Along with a nearly invisible facelift, front side airbags were new options for 2000, as were larger wheels, four-wheel discs, and rear heat ducts. The four-cylinder engine was also upgraded by 5 hp (3.7 kW).

The final Mazda 626 rolled off the Flat Rock, Michigan assembly plant on 30 August 2002 but in Colombia they were still being produced until 2005.

Model	Years	Engine	Power	Torque
Base	1998–1999	2.0 L FS I4	125 hp (93 kW)	127 lb⋅ft (172 N⋅m)
Base	2000–2002	2.0 L FS I4	130 hp (97 kW)	135 lb⋅ft (183 N⋅m)
V6	1998–2002	2.5 L KL V6	170 hp (127 kW)	163 lb⋅ft (221 N⋅m)

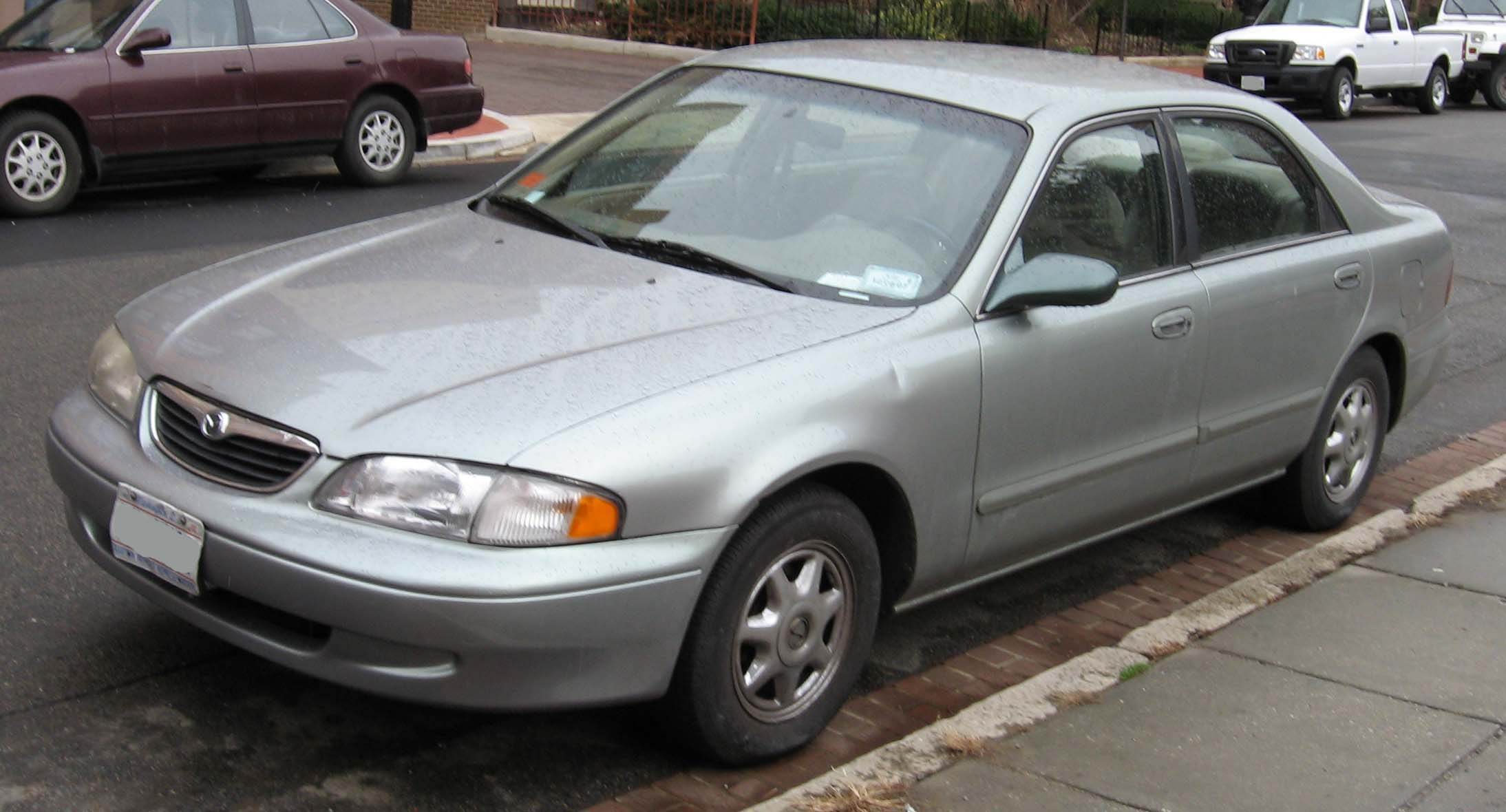
1998–1999 Mazda 626 (US)

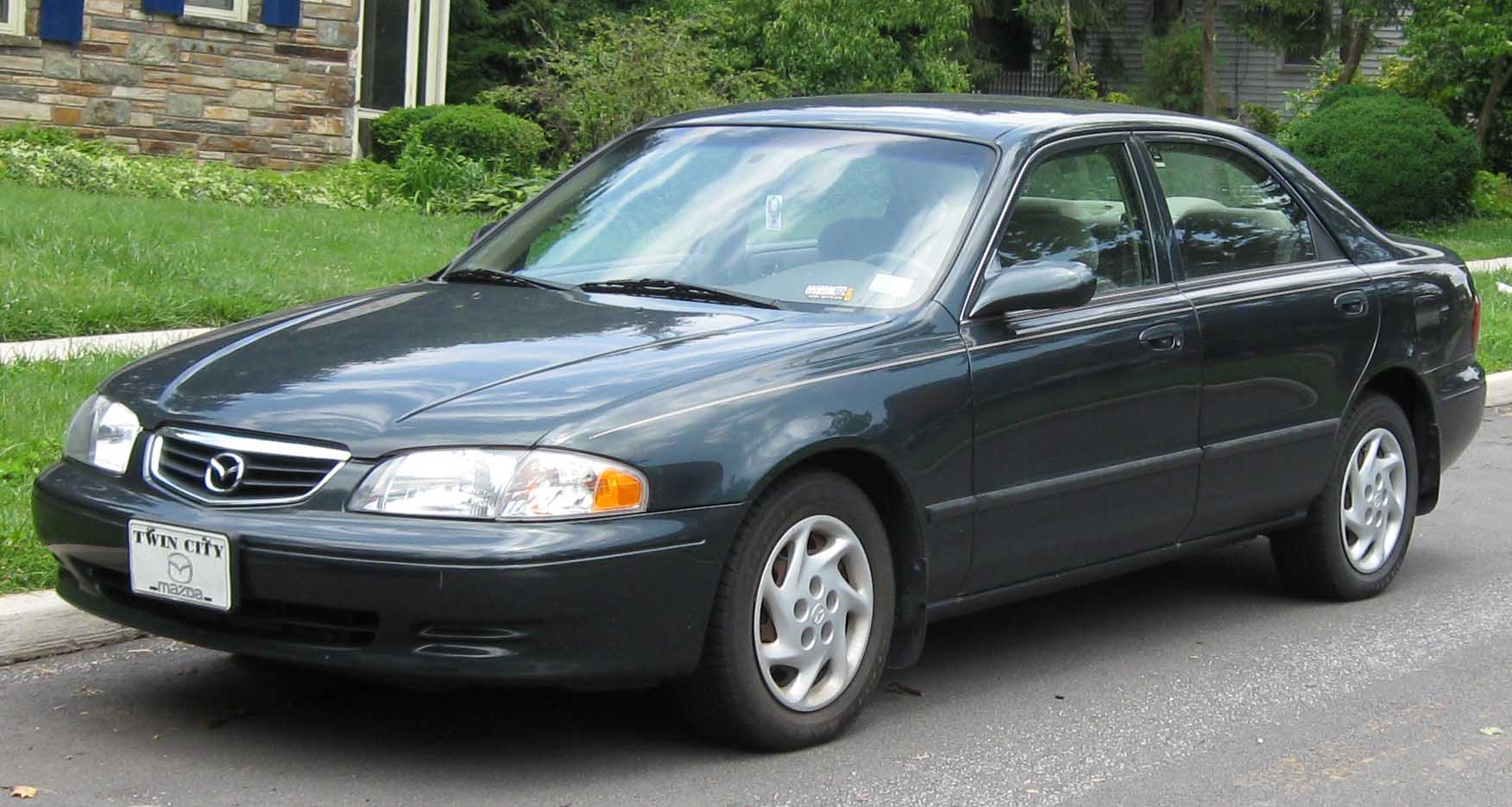
2000–2002 Mazda 626 (US)

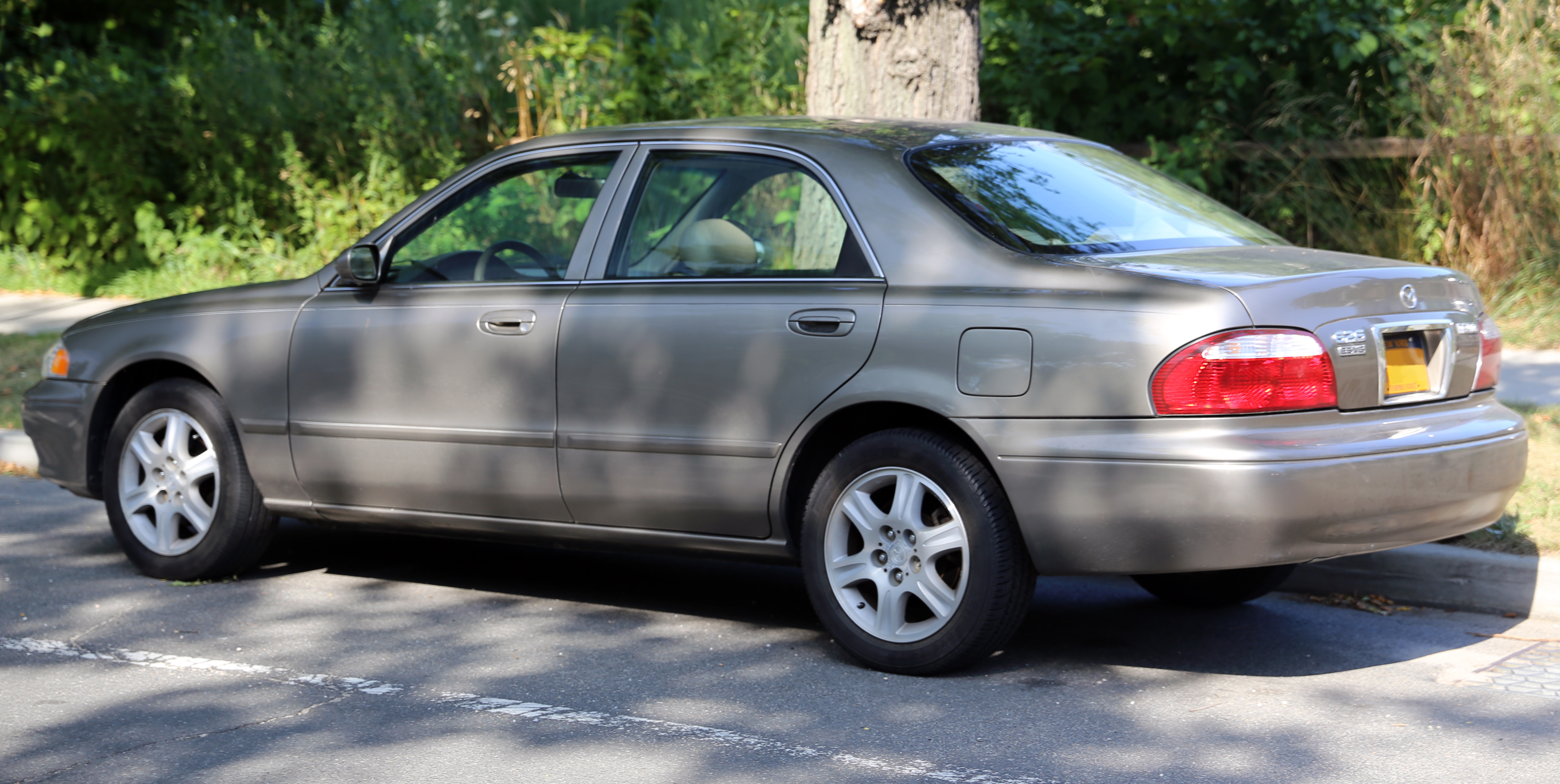
2000 Mazda 626 (US; facelift)
