= Mazda Xedos =

Japanese car range

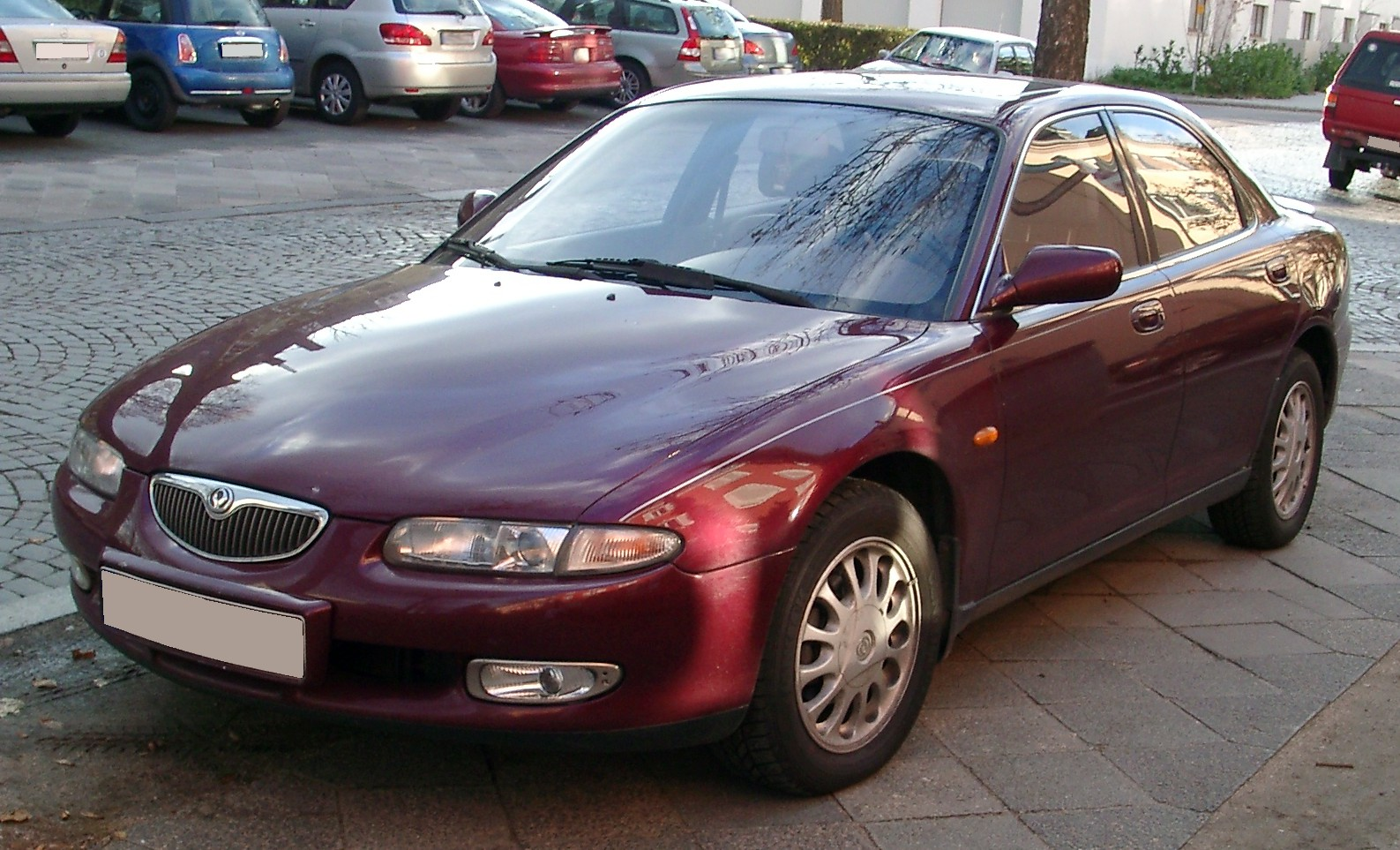
Mazda Xedos 6

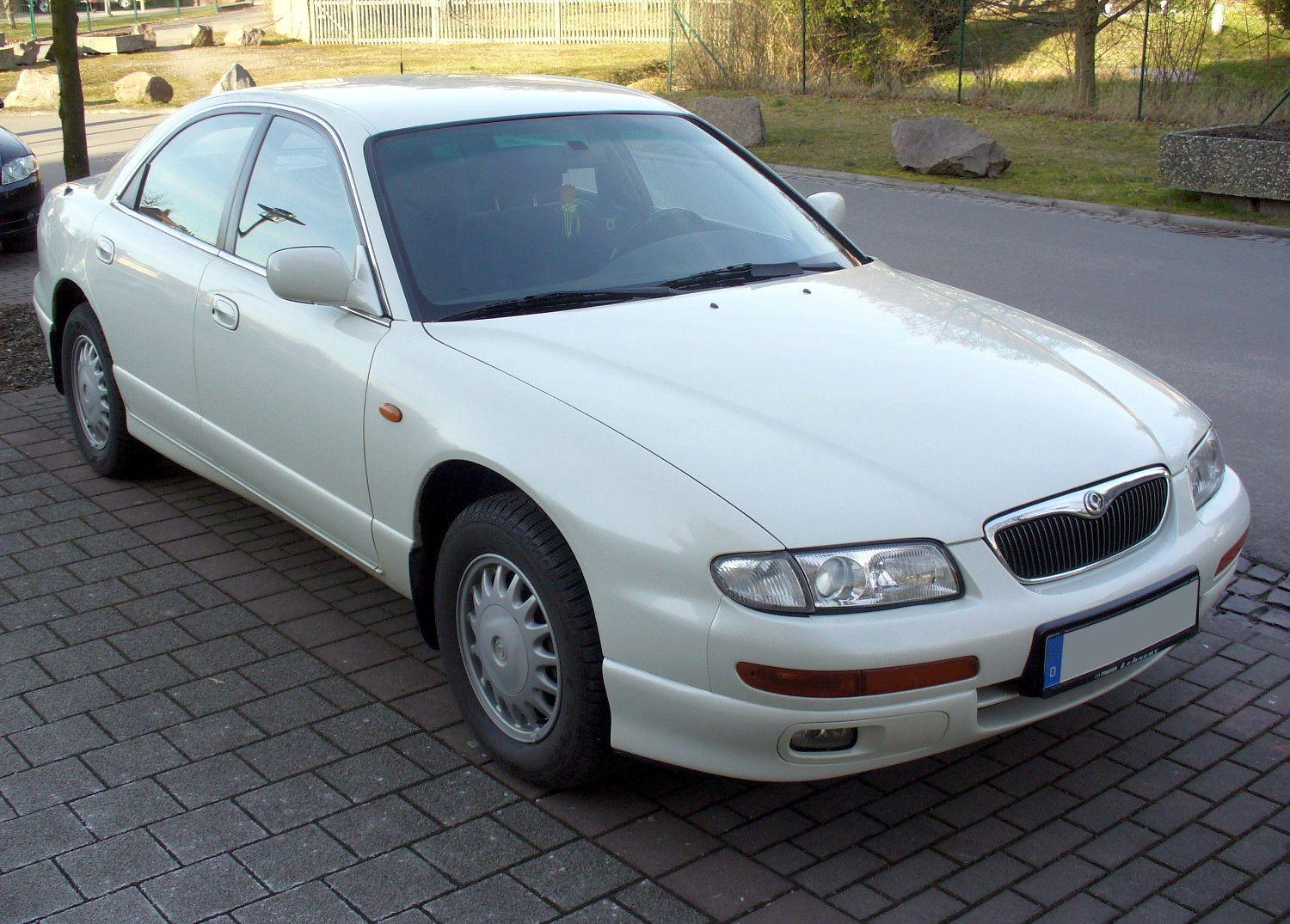
Mazda Xedos 9

The Mazda Xedos is a range of executive cars that were launched by Japanese manufacturer Mazda in 1992.

The first model was the Mazda Xedos 6, which was similar in size and in engine to the BMW 3 Series. The Xedos 6 was offered with two types of engines - 24 valve V6 with 144 hp named KF and 16 valve I4 with 107 hp named B6. In 1994, Xedos Mazda renewed the Xedos 6 model with changes to the exterior, as well as to the engine to meet new emissions standards.

The Xedos 6 was marketed as the Eunos 500 in Japan, Hong Kong and Australia. This vehicle was not sold in the United States and Canada. The total quantity of Xedos 6 and Eunos 500 manufactured is 72,101.

By 1994, there was a larger model called the Mazda Xedos 9, which was of a similar size to the BMW 5 Series. The Xedos 9 was marketed as the Eunos 800 in Japan and Australia, and as the Mazda Millenia in the United States.

Production ceased in 2000.
