= Lantis =

Lantis may refer to:

- Lantis (company), a defunct Japanese recording company
- Mazda Lantis, a car made by Mazda
- Lantis, a character in Magic Knight Rayearth
