= Mazda Lantis =

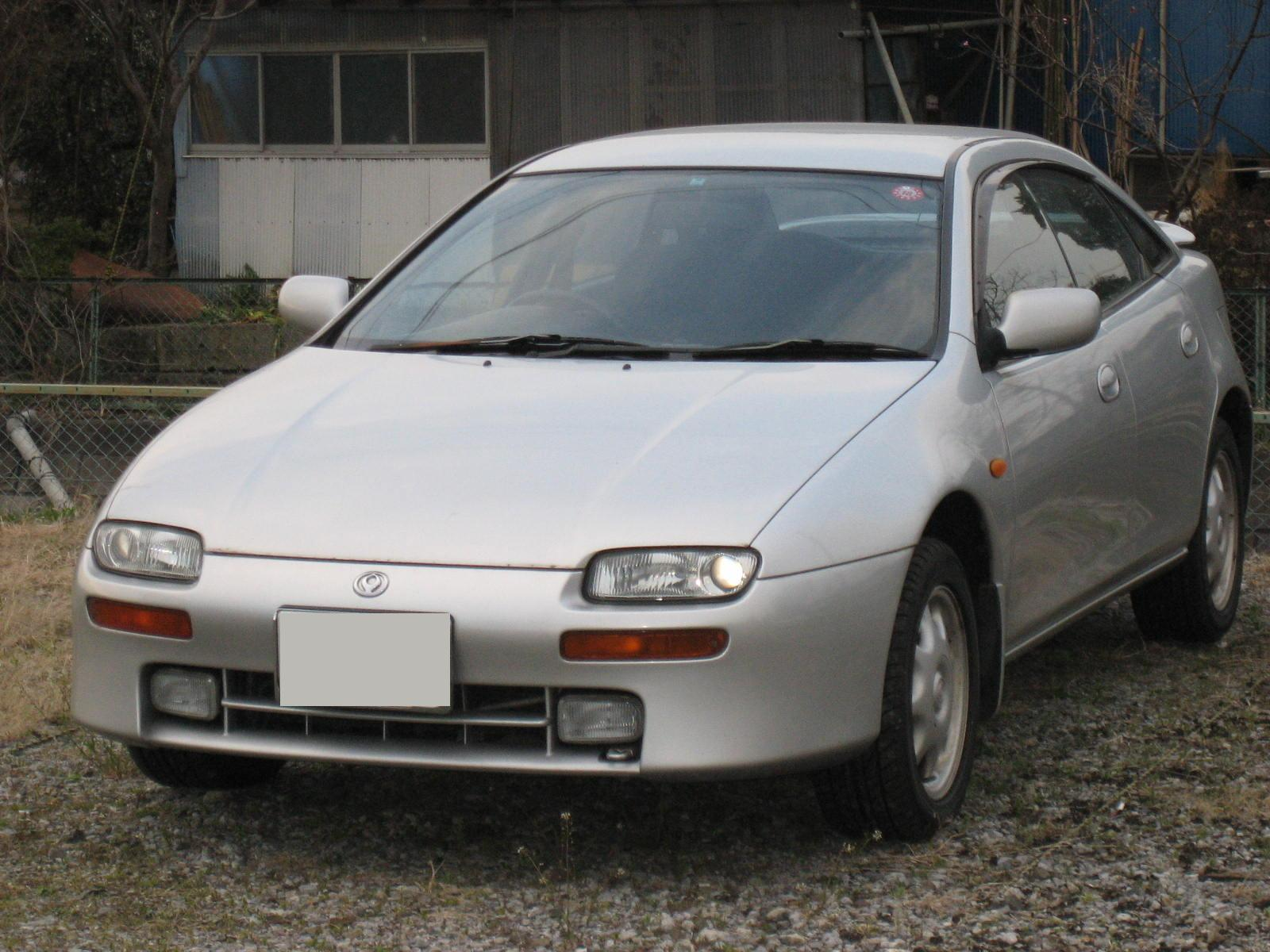

Overview
- Manufacturer: Mazda
- Model code: CB
- Also called: Mazda 323F; Mazda 323 Astina; Mazda Astina; Mazda Allegro Hatchback; Mazda Artis Hatchback
- Production: 1993–1998
- Assembly: South Africa: Silverton, Pretoria (Samcor)
- Designer: Ginger (Arnold) Ostle

Body and chassis
- Class: Sports compact
- Body style: 5-door hatchback; 4-door sedan
- Layout: FF layout
- Related: Mazda Familia

Powertrain
- Engine: 1.5 L Z5 I4; 1.6 L B6-D I4; 1.8 L BP I4; 2.0 L KF-DE V6; 2.0 L KF-ZE V6
- Transmission: 5-speed manual; 4-speed F-4EAT automatic

Dimensions
- Wheelbase: 2,605 mm (102.6 in)
- Length: 4,245 mm (167.1 in) (hatchback); 4,490 mm (177 in) (sedan)
- Width: 1,695 mm (66.7 in)
- Height: 1,355 mm (53.3 in)
- Curb weight: 1,210 kg (2,668 lbs)

Chronology
- Predecessor: Mazda Familia Astina

The Mazda Lantis (Japanese: マツダ・ランティス) is a series of two sports compact cars sold in Japan from 1993 to 1998. In the rest of the world it was also known as 323F, Astina, 323 Astina, Allegro Hatchback or Artis Hatchback.

The Mazda Lantis used Mazda's CB platform, which means close relations to the Eunos 500/Xedos 6 and the 1994-1997 Mazda Capella. It was an FF layout car with a transversely mounted engine and either a 5-speed manual or 4-speed automatic transmission.

The body variant is what Mazda called a "4-door coupé", which in common terminology is a 5-door hatchback. In Europe the 5-door hatchback was designated BA, but was actually almost identical to the CB, and had little to do with other B platforms.

The 5-door was sold as the Mazda 323F in Europe, Artis in Chile and Allegro Hatchback (HB) in Colombia and a few other countries of Latin America. This model was penned by Ginger (Arnold) Ostle, who worked for Porsche before arriving at Mazda. He was the Chief of the Porsche Design Office and also assisted in the design of the Porsche 944, which has been referenced as an artistic inspiration for the design of the Lantis.

The Mazda 323F weighs in at just 1,210 kg (2,668 lbs) and came standard with a naturally aspirated DOHC 1.5L, 1.6L or 1.8L inline-four engine with VICS paired with a 55-litre fuel tank. It features a single driver airbag, power steering, disk-brakes all-round although the front were ventilated, electrically adjustable mirrors, central locking and power windows. Standard suspension had independent wish-bone springs at the front and rear as well as 14-inch rims with a tyre offset of 185/65. Another noticeable feature are the frameless windows, similar to the Nissan Presea. Additionally, there existed optional factory upgrades such as the sportier n/a DOHC 2.0L 24-valve V6 with VRIS, which existed in multiple states of tune, ABS, a passenger airbag, a modest rear spoiler and a glass sunroof. The V6, specifically, sports an extraordinarily rigid yet smooth suspension setup to ensure exceptional handling with longer-than-usual suspension arms and the front dampers including built-in rebounding springs for stability, as well as 16-inch rims with a low-profile offset of 205/50 allowing for excellent cornering and grip.

By the time the cars premiered in August 1993, Mazda's multi-brand strategy had become difficult to sustain, so both Lantis variants were released to Mazda, Efini and Eunos dealerships. Sales in Japan were lacklustre throughout the Lantis' production run, with only 45,000 of the 230,000 Lantis' produced staying in Japan which caused domestic sales to halt in 1997, but the 323F proved to be immensely popular in Europe and some Latin America countries, where it sold in reasonable numbers right until it was discontinued in 1998. The JDM Lantis was a popular used export to New Zealand.

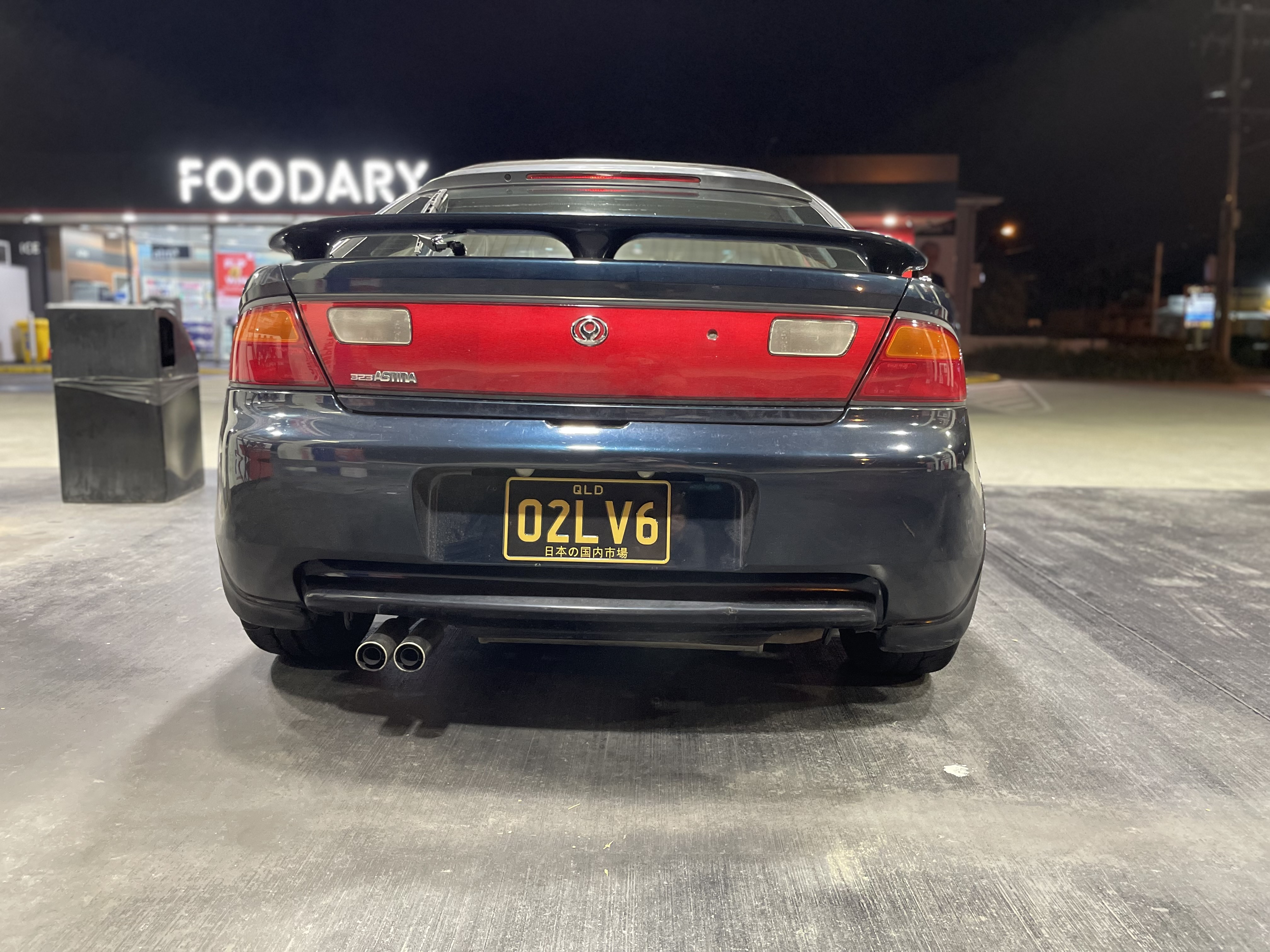
Lowered Mazda 323 Astina V6 with optional spoiler in Queensland

The Lantis' 1.8L four-cylinder variant had 4-valves per cylinder, a compression ratio of 9:1 and featured multi-port manifold injection. It made 133ps (98 kw; 131 bhp) and 152 Nm (112.11 lb-ft) of torque @ 5,000 rpm, giving it a power-per-litre of 71.2 bhp/L, a power-to-weight ratio of 112.9 bhp/tonne and a torque-to-weight ratio of 131 Nm/tonne. The manual transmission was markedly more fuel-efficient, having a fuel-consumption rating of 8.3L/100km in the city and 5L/100km on the highway making for an average fuel rating of 6.8L/100km. In comparison, the automatic transmission had an average fuel rating of 9.4L/100km. Although electronically capped to 180km/h in Japan due to law, it had an actual top speed of 190km/h and the manual transmission recorded a 0-100km/h time of 9.6 seconds. It's optional V6, however, was more substantial and existed in three states of tune depending on the market and year. The V6 had a compression ratio of 10.1 from 1993-1994 and 10.5:1 from 1994-1996 when the engine ceased production. In 1993-1994 the engine made 146ps (107 kw; 144 hp) and in 1994-1996 162ps (119 kw; 160 bhp). In exchange for its higher power the V6 was less fuel efficient than the 1.8L with the manual transmission recording a fuel rating of 8.7L/100km and the automatic 10L/100km.

The rare Type-R version of the Mazda Lantis was exclusively sold in Japan and could only be obtained in Europe and other parts of the world through import. The Type-R features a 170ps (125 kw, 168 bhp) 2.0L (122 ci) KF-ZE 24-valve DOHC V6 engine with 180 Nm (133 lb-ft) of torque @ 5,500 rpm, a limited-slip differential and appearance options like a front lip spoiler, side skirts, floating rear spoiler, coloured front indicators and other modifications known collectively as the Mazdaspeed A-Spec kit. It has a power-per-litre of 85ps (84 bhp), a power-to-weight ratio of 140ps (139 bhp) / ton and a torque-to-weight ratio of 149 Nm/ton. The manual Type-R completed Tsukuba circuit in 1:14.17 and had a quarter-mile time of 15.9 seconds. Mazda also raced the Type-R in domestic touring car racing such as the Japanese Touring Car Championship.

The name Lantis is created from the Latin phrase "Latens Curtis", which roughly translates as "To secretly shorten".

Although the 323F lacks a badge indicating which engine is fitted, the V6 version is easily recognizable since it is the only 323F with 5 stud hubs.

The South African and possibly other versions of the 323F branded as the Astina do include badges on the back indicating the engine capacity. The 1.8l is displayed with a badge reading 180 for example.

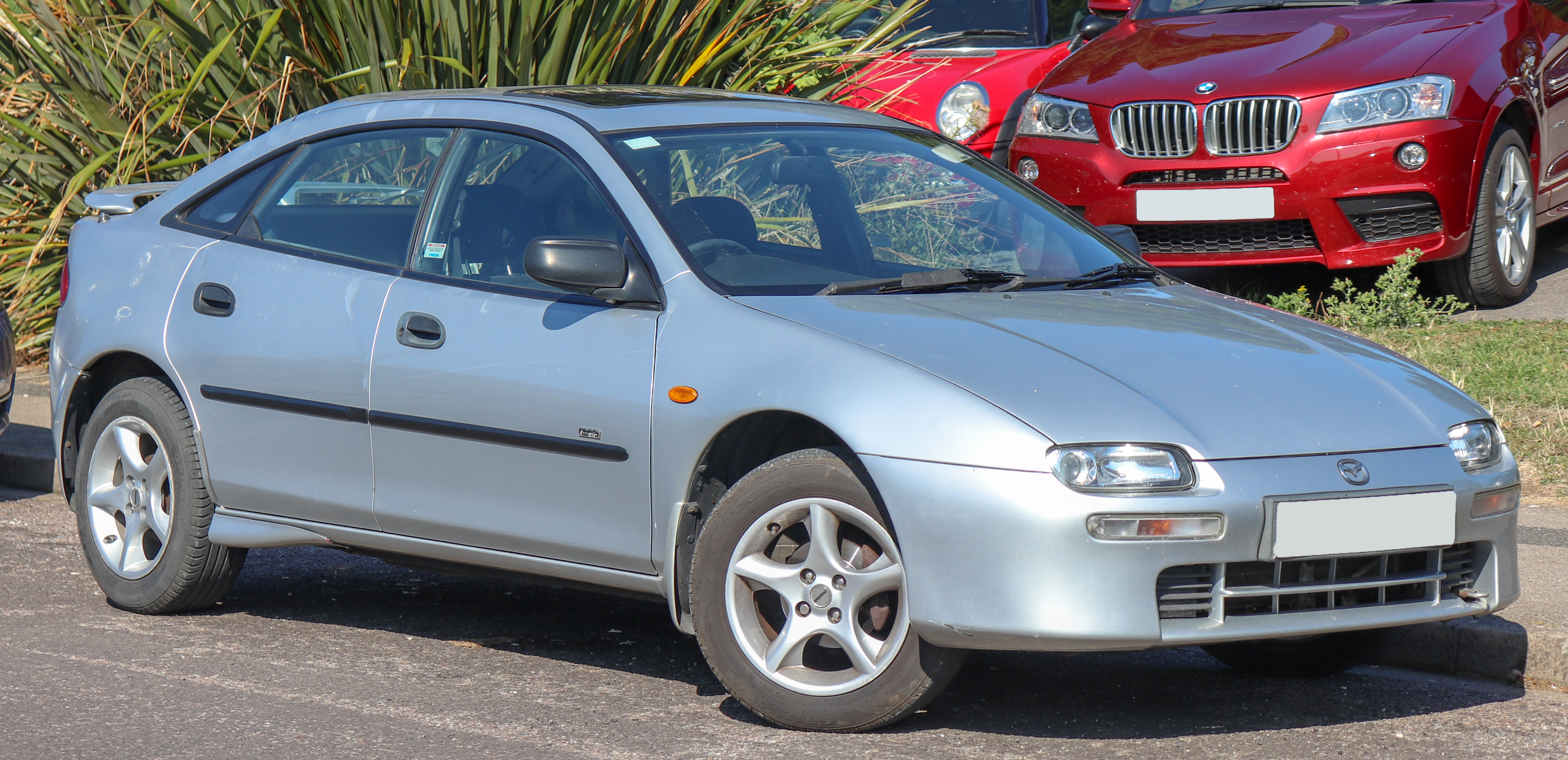
Mazda 323F (European version)

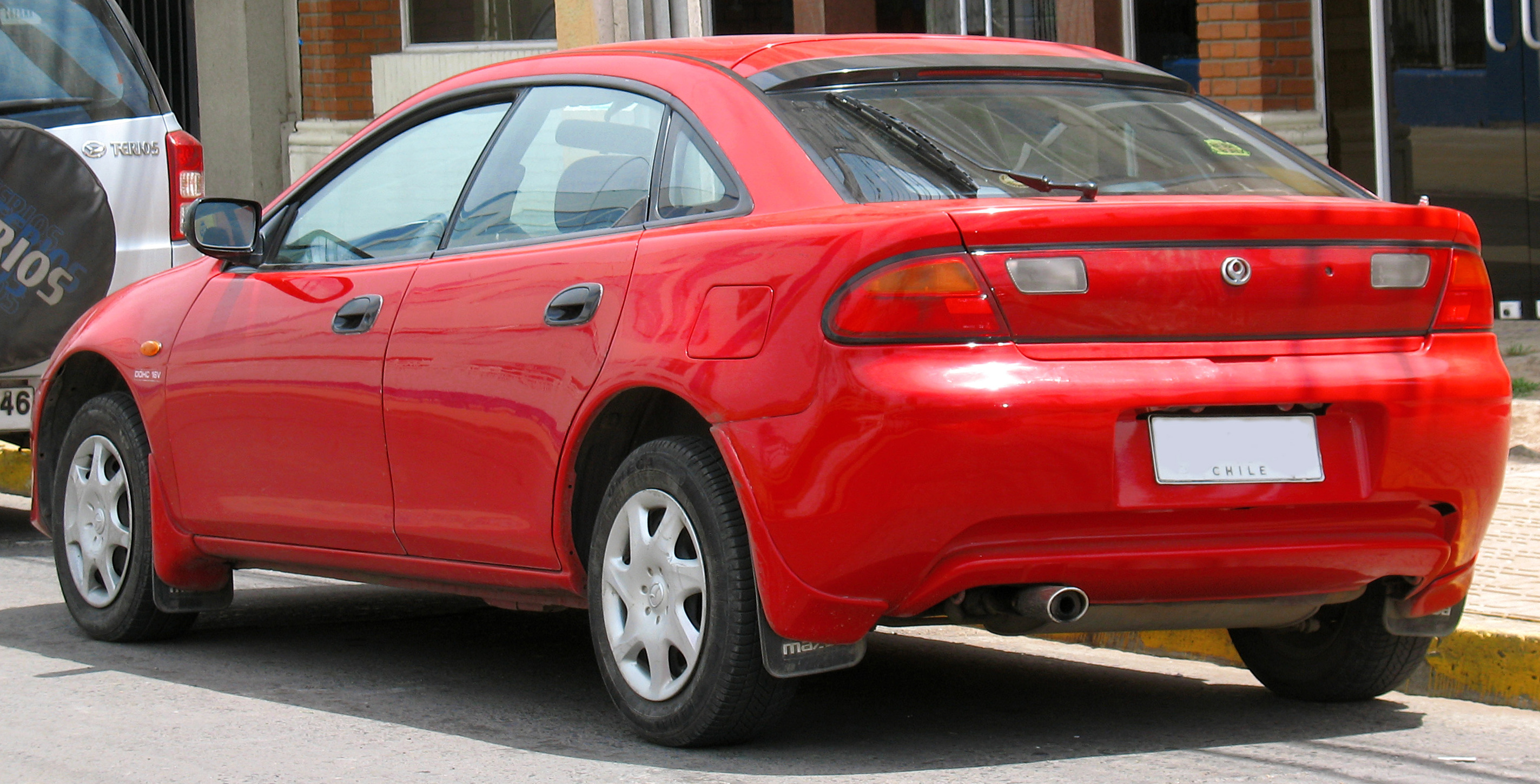
Rear view of the hatchback

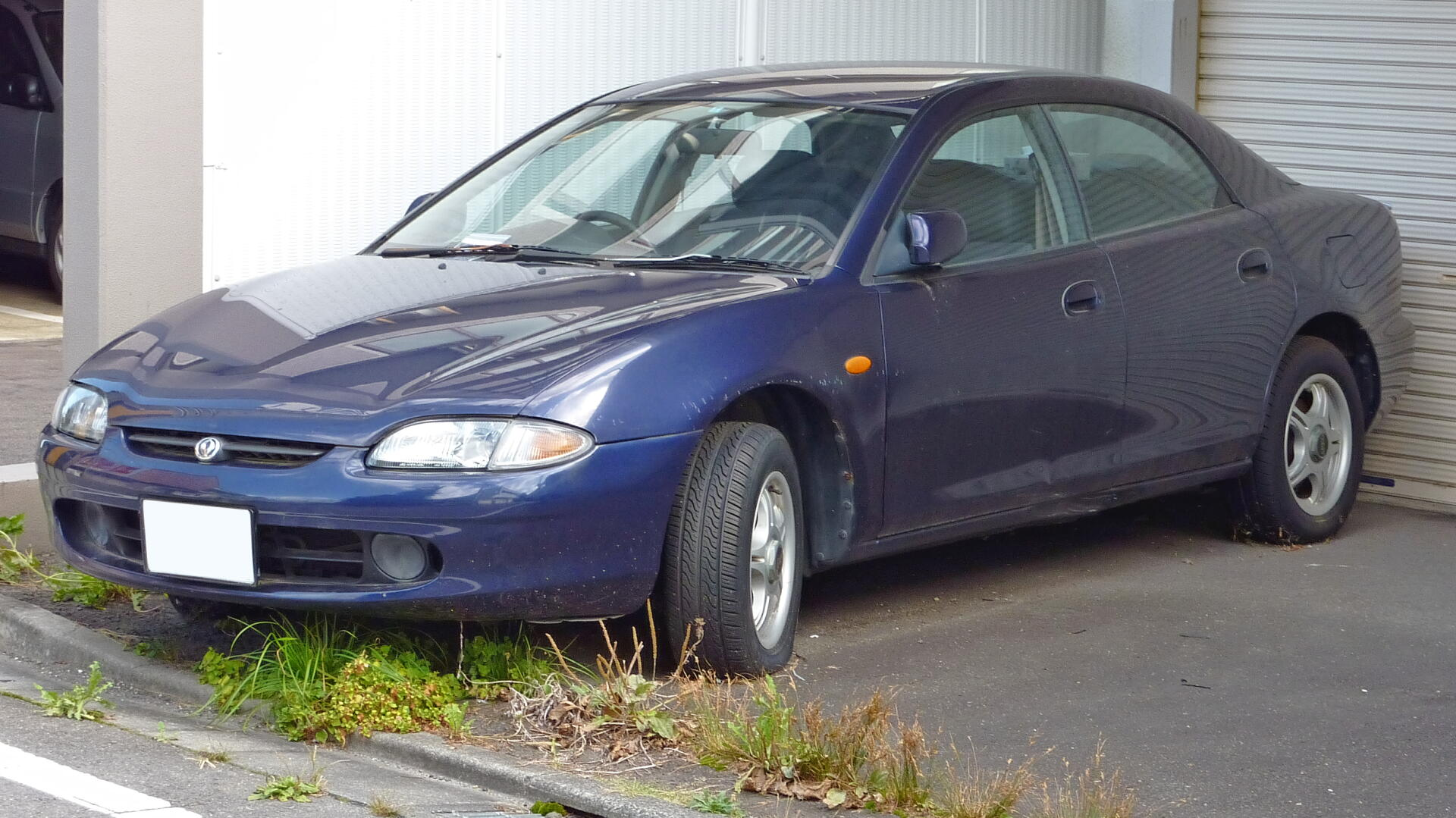
Mazda Lantis Sedan (Japan)

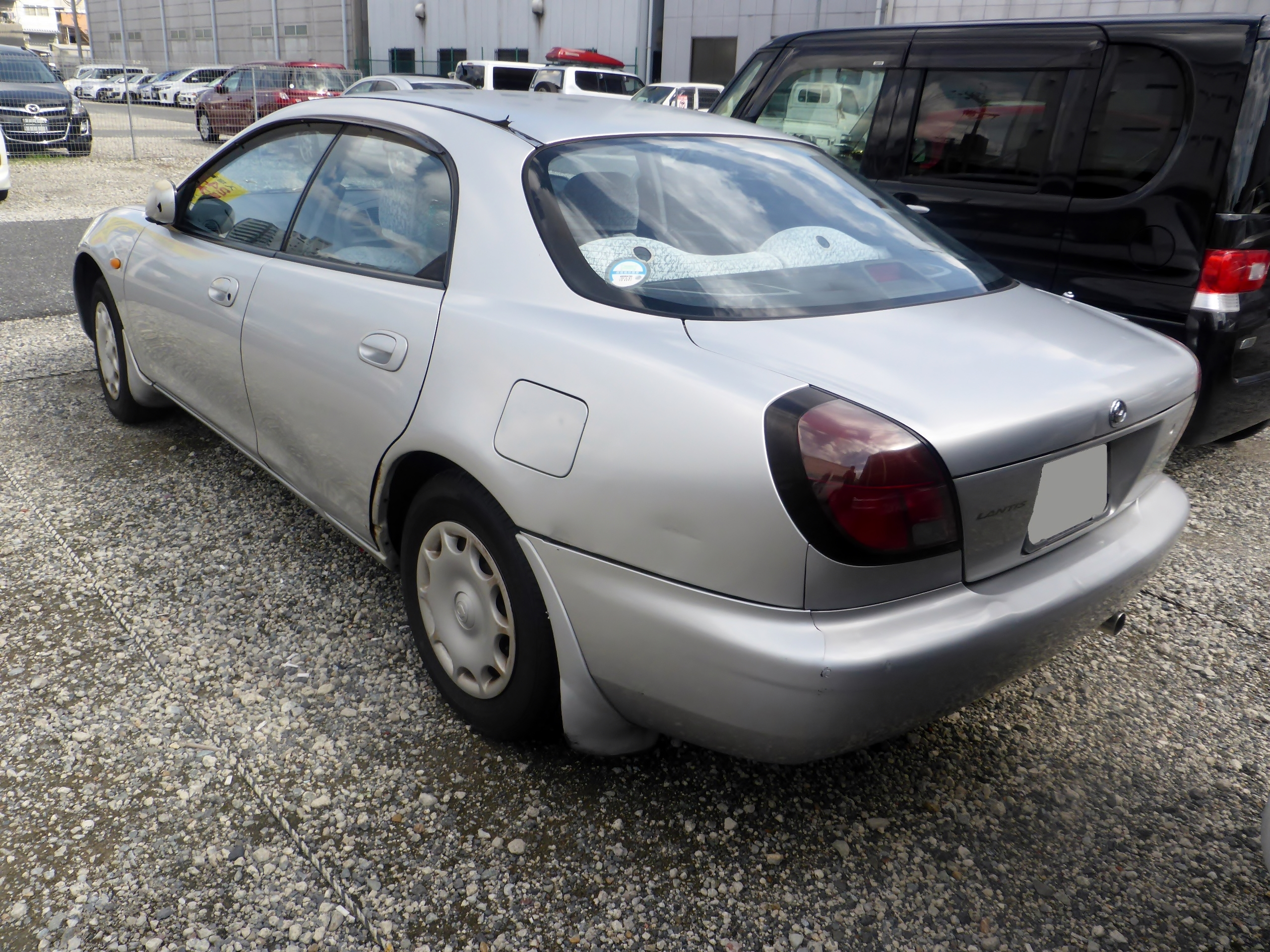
Rear view of the sedan
