= Mazda K engine =

Japanese V6 car engine design

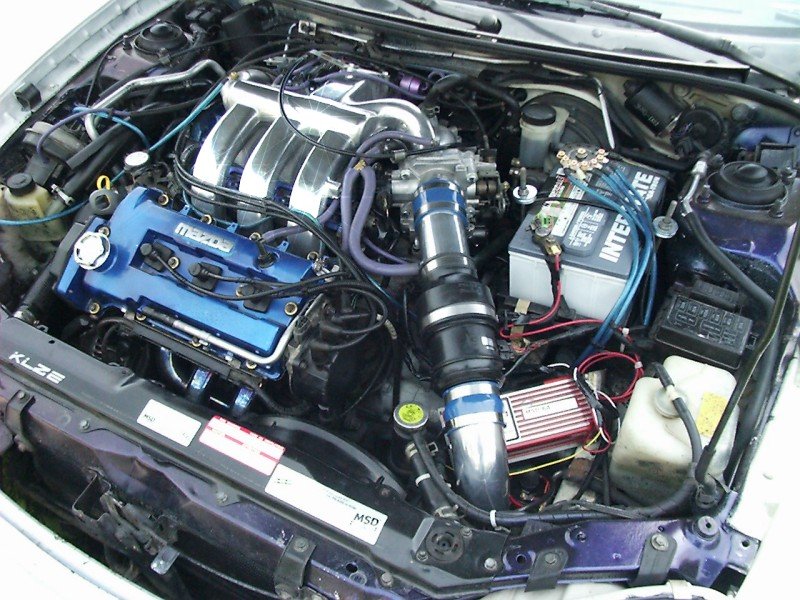

Overview
- Manufacturer: Mazda
- Production: 1991–2002

Layout
- Configuration: 60° V6
- Displacement: 1.8 L (1,845 cc); 2.0 L (1,995 cc); 2.3 L (2,255 cc); 2.5 L (2,497 cc)
- Cylinder bore: 75 mm (2.95 in); 78 mm (3.07 in); 80.3 mm (3.16 in); 84.5 mm (3.33 in)
- Piston stroke: 69.6 mm (2.74 in); 74.2 mm (2.92 in)
- Cylinder block material: Aluminium
- Cylinder head material: Aluminium
- Valvetrain: DOHC 4 valves x cyl.

RPM range
- Max. engine speed: 7,000

Combustion
- Supercharger: Twin-screw type (on KJ-ZEM)
- Fuel system: Fuel injection
- Fuel type: Gasoline
- Cooling system: Water cooled

Output
- Power output: 130–217 hp (97–162 kW; 132–220 PS)
- Torque output: 115–210 lb⋅ft (156–285 N⋅m)

Chronology
- Successor: Mazda AJ engine

The Mazda K-series automobile engine is a short stroke 60° 24-valve V6 with belt-driven DOHC and all-aluminium construction. Displacements range from 1.8 L to 2.5 L. They all use a 27-degree DOHC valvetrain with directly actuated hydraulic bucket lifters. The K-series also features a highly rigid aluminum split-crankcase engine block design with 4-bolt mains with additional bolts securing the lower block, an internally balanced forged steel crankshaft with lightweight powder forged carbon steel connecting rods. They were designed with the intent of being as compact as possible for short-hood front-wheel drive applications.

One unique innovation of the K-series was the introduction of Variable Resonance Induction System (VRIS). Based on the Helmholtz resonance principle, the intake manifold is equipped with 3 chambers tuned to a specific resonant frequency. The computer dynamically switches between each resonant chamber to achieve the appropriate resonant frequency for the engine's rpm. This effect optimizes volumetric efficiency over a given rpm range to provide maximum torque over the entire rpm range. VRIS is used on the K8, KF, and KL but nearly all modern Mazda V6s are now using this technology.

The K-series all have a 7,000 rpm redline with 7500-7800 rpm limiter, which given the engine design is conservative. The KJ-ZEM Miller cycle engine had a 6,000 rpm redline, but was only available with an automatic transmission.

== K8 ==
The 1.8 L (1,845 cc) K8 is among the smallest production V6 engines ever; and also the first K-series engine to be used in a Mazda car (in the Mazda MX-3). It was a DOHC 4-valve design with VRIS and a bore and stroke of 75 mm × 69.6 mm (2.95 in × 2.74 in). It produced 130 hp (97 kW; 132 PS) in US trim (sometimes referred to as "K8-DE"), and 135 hp (101 kW; 137 PS) in Japanese trim (the "K8-ZE") on introduction in 1991 and 144 hp (107 kW; 146 PS) and 115 lb⋅ft (156 N⋅m) at its best. The displacement was held under 2000cc to minimize the annual Japanese road tax obligation.

Applications:

- Mazda MX-3
- Eunos 500

== KF ==
- 2.0 L KF - 2.0 L (1,995 cc) 78 mm × 69.6 mm (3.07 in × 2.74 in) bore and stroke - The 2.0 L KF engine was available in various states of tune. The KF-DE produced 140 hp (104 kW; 142 PS) and 132 lb⋅ft (179 N⋅m) and later on 144 hp (107 kW; 146 PS) and 132 lb⋅ft (179 N⋅m). The JDM version KF-ZE engine produced 160 hp (119 kW; 162 PS) and 132 lb⋅ft (179 N⋅m). The Lantis Type R variant produced 170 hp (127 kW; 172 PS) and 140 lb⋅ft (190 N⋅m).
Applications:
- 1991-1997 Mazda MX-6
- 1992-1993 Eunos 500, 160 hp (119 kW; 162 PS) 180 N⋅m (133 lb⋅ft)
- 1993-2002 Eunos 800
- 1992-1998 Efini MS-8
- 1993-1999 Xedos 6
- 1993-2002 Xedos 9
- 1993-1996 Mazda Lantis Type R 170 hp (124 kW; 172 PS) 190 N•m (140 lb•ft)
- 1994-1996 Mazda 323f V6 GLX
- 1996-1998 Mazda 323f ZXi
- 1992-1995 Ford Telstar TX5 Ghia
- 1993-2003 Mazda 626 LX

== KJ-ZEM ==
The 2.3 L (2,255 cc) 80.3 mm × 74.2 mm (3.16 in × 2.92 in) bore and stroke, KJ-ZEM was one of Mazda's most technologically advanced engines. It employs the "Miller cycle" which uses a supercharger to increase compression efficiency by decreasing the compression losses (i.e., flywheel energy used to compress the intake charge in the cylinder); and thereby increasing the net power output of the V6. It was used in the T-platform cars. The supercharger used is the twin-screw type with electronic boost control. Power output was 217 hp (162 kW; 220 PS) and 210 lb⋅ft (285 N⋅m). The KJ-ZEM was on the Ward's 10 Best Engines list for 1995 through 1998.

Applications:

- Mazda Millenia S
- Eunos 800
- Mazda Xedos 9

== KL ==
The 2.5 L (2,497 cc) KL family uses an 84.5 mm × 74.2 mm (3.33 in × 2.92 in) bore and stroke. It includes the Japan-only KL-ZE, which produced 200 hp (149 kW; 203 PS) and 165 lb⋅ft (224 N⋅m). Another variant, the KL-DE (also known as the KL-03 outside the US, and fitted to 2.5-litre Ford Probes) was the worldwide version, with 164–174 bhp (122–130 kW; 166–176 PS) in various applications. In 1998 a revised version of the KL known as the KL-G4 was used in the 626. It featured solid lifters, a cast crankshaft to reduce rotating mass and a reworked intake system. The distributor was replaced with a Ford EDIS coil-pack ignition.

Mazda introduced a key technology with these engines, known as the Variable Resonance Induction System (VRIS). A series of two butterfly valves coupled with electronically controlled actuators varied the volume and length of a resonant chamber within the intake manifold. The valves actuate at particular induction frequencies to produce optimal torque/horsepower output at any given engine speed. The valve operates to create three specific first-order resonant frequencies that increase cylinder air charge. All three resonances are used from 0 to 6250 rpm (6800 for the KL-ZE). Above that threshold, the first primary resonant chamber is again used, but at this engine speed the pressure wave from the second-order resonant frequency aids in charging the cylinder.

Applications:
- KL-DE
  - 1993-1997 Mazda MX-6 LS (A spec)
  - 1993-1997 Ford Probe GT
  - 1993-1997 Mazda 626 ES, LX (after 1994)
  - 1995-2002 Mazda Millenia L
- KL-ZE
  - 1992-1995 Ford Telstar TX5 Ghia, TX5 Ghia 4ws
  - 1997 Mazda Capella Wagon
  - 1993+ Mazda 626 Jspec Sedan
  - 1993+ Mazda MX-6 Jspec
  - 1993+ Mazda MS-8 (Japan)
  - 1993+ Mazda Eunos 600/800 (Japan)
- KL-G4
  - 1998-2002 Mazda 626 ES, LX
