= Mazda Millenia =

Executive sedan

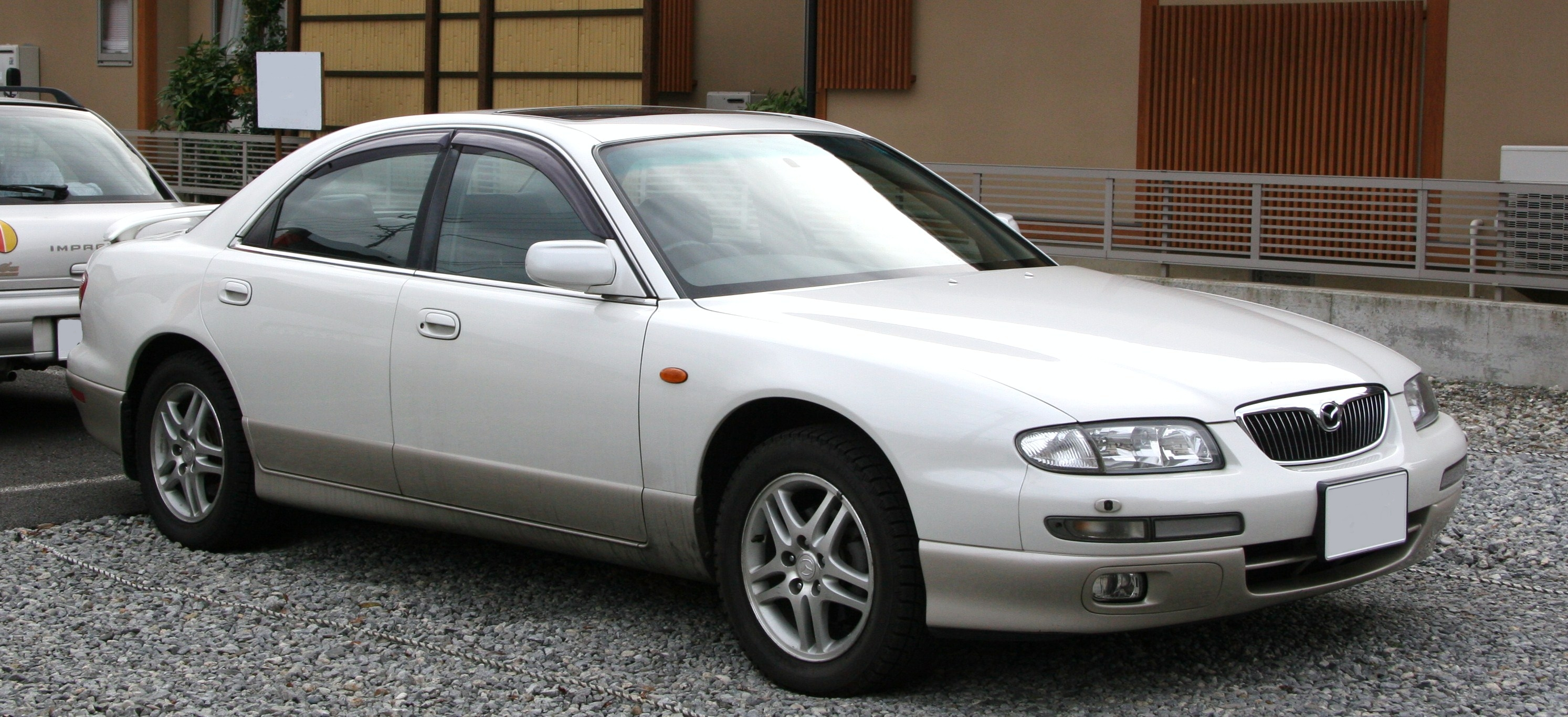
- 1998–2000 Mazda Millenia

Overview
- Manufacturer: Mazda
- Also called: Eunos 800; Mazda Xedos 9; Mazda Eunos 800 (Australia and Hong Kong)
- Production: 1993–2002
- Assembly: Japan: Hiroshima (Hiroshima Plant)
- Designer: Yujiro Daikoku (1990)

Body and chassis
- Class: Executive car
- Body style: 4-door sedan
- Layout: Front-engine, front-wheel-drive
- Platform: Mazda TA platform

Powertrain
- Engine: 2.0L KF-DE V6; 2.3L KJ-ZEM Miller cycle V6; 2.5L KL-DE V6
- Power output: 140 hp (104 kW) (2.0L); 210 hp (157 kW) (2.3L); 170 hp (127 kW) (2.5L)
- Transmission: 5-speed manual (European 2-liter and 2.5 liter only); 4-speed GF4A-EL automatic; 4-speed LJ4A-EL (Jatco RE4F04A) automatic

Dimensions
- Wheelbase: 2,751 mm (108.3 in)
- Length: 4,821 mm (189.8 in) (1995-2000); 4,867 mm (191.6 in) (2001-02)
- Width: 1,770 mm (69.7 in)
- Height: 1,394 mm (54.9 in)

The Mazda Millenia (stylized as millenia) is an automobile manufactured by Mazda in Japan from 1993 to 2002. The Millenia was originally planned as one of the first models for Mazda's proposed luxury brand Amati.

As it was targeted at a more upscale market from typical Mazda customers, the Millenia was engineered to far greater levels of perceived quality than the more mainstream Mazda cars, such as improved interior plastic quality, smaller panel gaps and a thicker, more even paint coating, thanks to a novel process of painting the body while it rotated on a massive spindle. Mazda claimed attention to detail like this was intended to set "standards for at least ten years".

At the time of its release, it was the first and only production car in the world to employ a Miller cycle engine, a design which Mazda would not use again until the second generation Mazda2 in 2008, and in modern Mazdas using the SKYACTIV engine.

== Plans for Amati ==
The Millenia was originally intended to serve as the launch model in 1994 for Mazda's new luxury brand Amati under the name Amati 500. In June of the same year, Amati produced a logo and announced plans for a $75 million marketing campaign with Los Angeles-based Lord, Dentsu & Partners planned to start at the end of 1993. Mazda expected to sell 20,000 vehicles a year in 1994 and to double that by 1995.

The recession caused by the collapse of the Japanese asset price bubble led to the cancellation of Amati by October 1992, and by November 1993 it was decided to sell the Millenia as a Mazda instead.

"Millenia" is a misspelling of millennia, a multiple of one thousand years.

== Branding post-Amati ==
As the company's finances dwindled due to the collapse of the bubble economy, Mazda scrapped the launch of the Amati brand. Instead, the car was rebadged and sold through Mazda's various sub-bands under different model names depending on the market. There was no equivalent version offered by Mazda's Ẽfini or Autozam.

=== Europe ===
Mazda of Europe sold the Millenia as the Mazda Xedos 9 between 1993 and 2002. There was also a smaller, compact Mazda Xedos 6 offered at the same time.

=== Japan & Australia ===
In right-hand drive Japan and Australia, the Millenia was marketed as the Eunos 800 from 1993 through 1998, with the Miller Cycle-equipped version sold as the Eunos 800M. Yaw-sensitive four-wheel steering was available as an option in Japan; Mazda claimed that with this feature, the Millenia was capable of passing the elk test at speeds comparable to the BMW 850i and Nissan 300ZX.

Like in Europe, it was sold alongside the smaller Xedos 6, which itself was rebranded in these markets as the Eunos 500.

In July 1997, Mazda discontinued the Eunos brand and the Eunos 800 was renamed to Mazda Millenia.

==== Eunos 800M SP ====
Mazda Motorsport Australia released a limited edition Eunos 800M SP with improved suspension and larger alloy wheel and tire combination, but with no modifications to the engine.

=== North America ===
Launched in North America in 1994 (as a 1995 model year), the Mazda Millenia replaced the Mazda 929 as the brand's flagship sedan offering in North America. While the 929 had been the last non-luxury rear-wheel drive Japanese import sedan in the US, the Millenia was front-wheel drive. Unlike the other markets, there was no equivalent version of the Mazda Xedos 6/Eunos 500 sold in the US or Canada.

It was available in three models: the base model (called simply "Millenia"), the mid-level Millenia L (with standard leather upholstery, power moon roof and remote keyless entry), and the top-of-the-line Millenia S which featured optional heated front seats and came standard with the supercharged and dual-intercooled 2.3-liter V6 engine that operated on the Miller cycle, (as opposed to the more common Otto cycle at the time). This engine produced 50% more power than the base, naturally-aspirated 2.5L engine but also provided 50% better fuel economy.

All Millenia models came standard with dual front airbags, anti-lock brakes, and traction control. For poor traction situations, both transmissions offered a "Hold" feature on the gear selector that allowed drivers to lock the transmission into the gear below their current gear selector position (for example: enabling Hold when the gear selector was in "3" would hold 2nd gear).

Reception was generally positive, with reviewers praising the vehicle's combination of interior quality, engine performance, and overall value as superior to contemporary competitors like the BMW 3-series, Infiniti i30, Acura TL, Lexus ES300, and Mercedes C280. The Miller-Cycle engine specifically also received praise, earning a spot in Ward's 10 Best Engines every year from 1995 through 1998.

To capitalize on the cultural hype around the start of the new millennium, for model year 2000, Mazda added a new, limited-run "Millennium Edition" trim level positioned above the previously-top Millenia S. Using the same 2.3L engine the Millenia S, the 3000-unit Mazda Millenia Millennium Edition cars came standard with faux suede upholstery, a Bose audio system with a six-CD changer, 17-inch alloy wheels and two special paint colors: Highlight Silver Mica and Millennium Red Mica paint.

==== US Market Sales ====
| | 1994 | 1995 | 1996 | 1997 | 1998 | 1999 | 2000* | 2001 | 2002 | 2003 | 2004 |
| January | 0 | 1,429 | 998 | 1,126 | 1,114 | 1,113 | unknown | 1,301 | 1,904 | 509 | 7 |
| February | 400 | 1,450 | 960 | 1,173 | 1,000 | 1,203 | unknown | 1,665 | 1,771 | 450 | 1 |
| March | 1,874 | 1,794 | 1,036 | 1,214 | 1,031 | 1,333 | unknown | 1,286 | 1,925 | 304 | 7 |
| April | 2,708 | 1,494 | 1,055 | 1,346 | 1,031 | 1,399 | unknown | 1,455 | 1,583 | 192 | 0 |
| May | 3,236 | 1,503 | 1,153 | 1,930 | 1,085 | 1,605 | unknown | 1,892 | 1,707 | 139 | 1 |
| June | 3,114 | 2,467 | 828 | 2,086 | 1,428 | 1,487 | unknown | 3,761 | 1,368 | 86 | 0 |
| July | 2,338 | 1,658 | 856 | 1,761 | 3,686 | 1,563 | unknown | 1,643 | 1,432 | 64 | 2 |
| August | 2,882 | 1,504 | 1,219 | 2,018 | 3,941 | 1,536 | unknown | 1,407 | 1,680 | 29 | 0 |
| September | 2,593 | 1,512 | 1,138 | 1,414 | 600 | 2,160 | unknown | 1,392 | 1,407 | 13 | 0 |
| October | 1,860 | 2,992 | 1,147 | 1,684 | 656 | 2,746 | unknown | 1,594 | 1,149 | 13 | 0 |
| November | 1,698 | 2,262 | 1,375 | 1,172 | 568 | 1,659 | unknown | 1,242 | 1,223 | 3 | 0 |
| December | 1,720 | 1,496 | 1,254 | 1,096 | 577 | 1,394 | unknown | 1,211 | 917 | 10 | 0 |
| Total Millenia Sales | 24,423 | 21,561 | 13,019 | 18,020 | 16,717 | 19,198 | 16,558 | 19,849 | 18,066 | 1,812 | 18 |
| All Mazda Sales | 375,416 | 283,745 | 238,285 | 221,840 | 240,547 | 243,708 | 255,526 | 269,602 | 258,213 | 258,865 | 263,882 |

(* Note: Monthly sales data could not be found for calendar year 2000, however the total sales for that year can be found in a year-over-year sales comparison table in the Automotive News Market Data Book for calendar year 2001.)

== Facelift ==
The vehicle received a minor facelift in 1997 primarily focused on cost-saving measures, such as downgrading the hood from aluminum to steel. This first facelift also coincided with the dissolution of the Eunos brand.

The Millenia was more dramatically facelifted for the 2001 model year, with most modifications updating the front and rear bumpers and grille as well as reinforcements to the body structure and larger brakes. Inside, the car added standard leather upholstery and a power lumbar support for the driver.

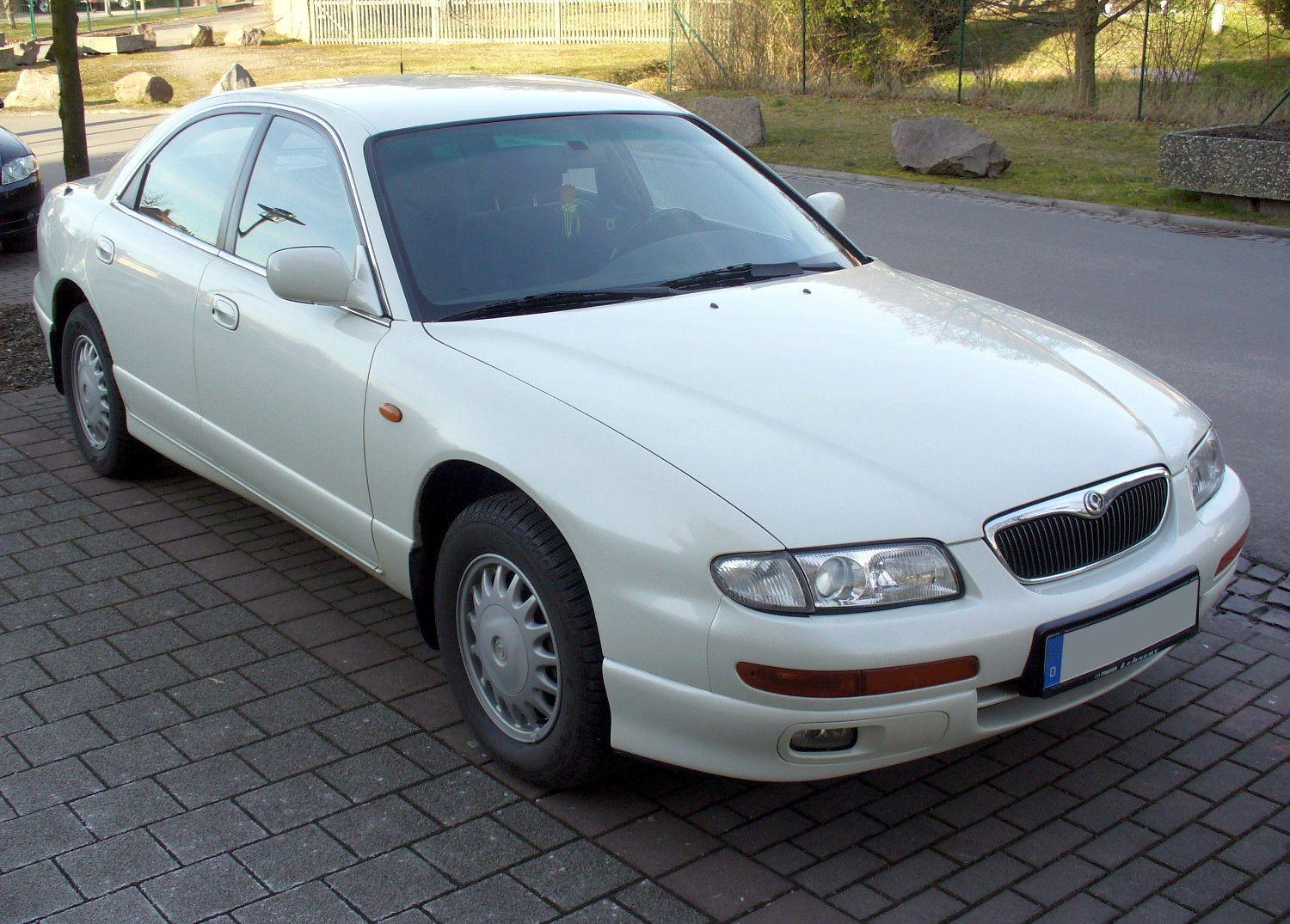
Mazda Xedos 9 (Europe)

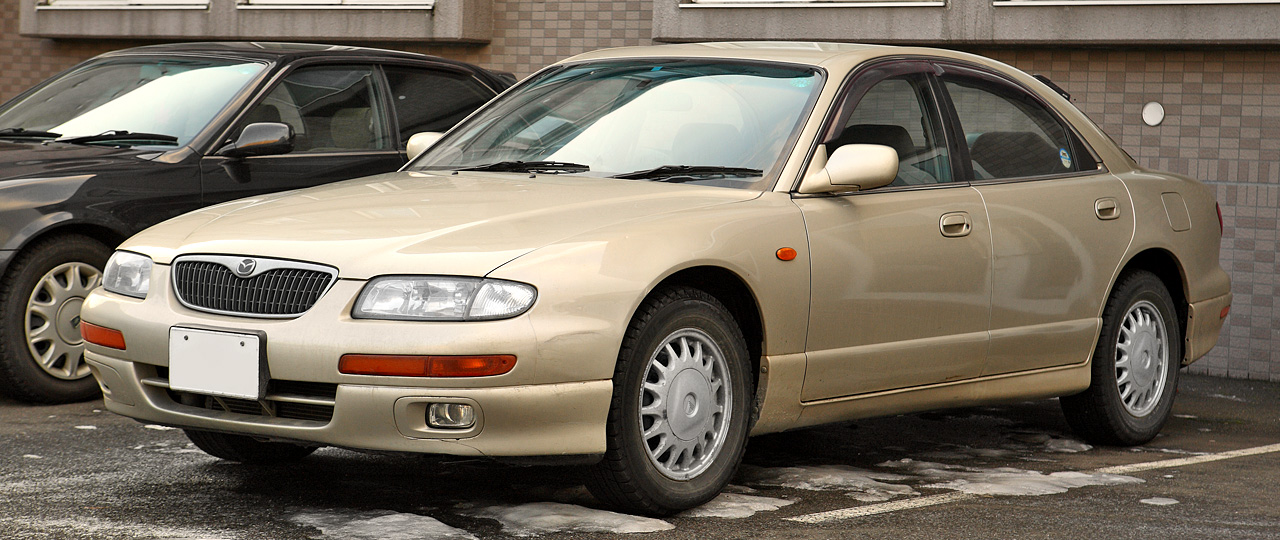
Eunos 800 2.5 (pre-facelift)

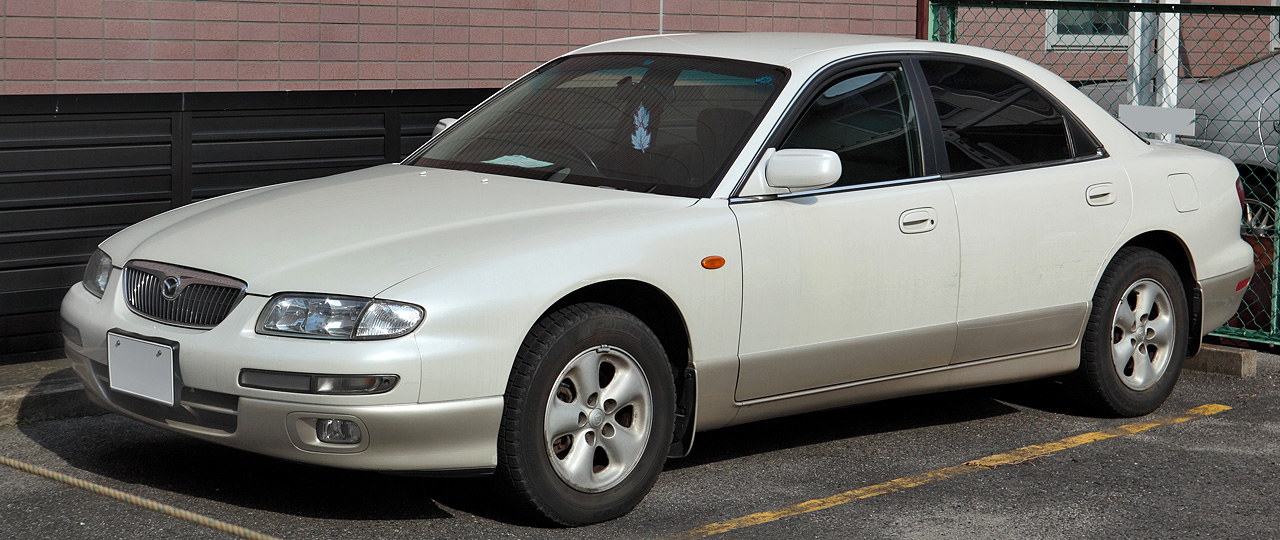
1998-2000 Mazda Millenia (Japan)

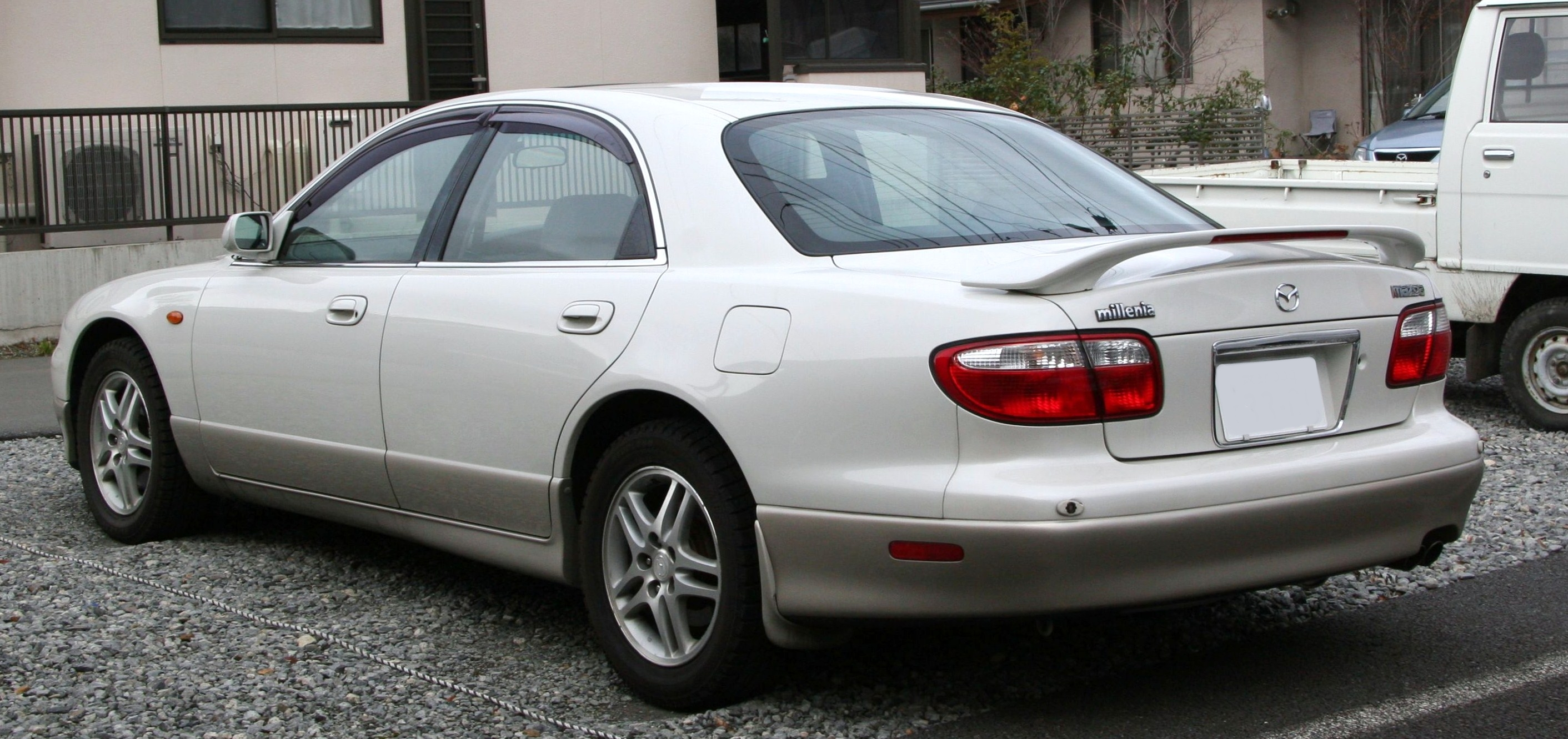
1998-2000 Mazda Millenia (Japan)

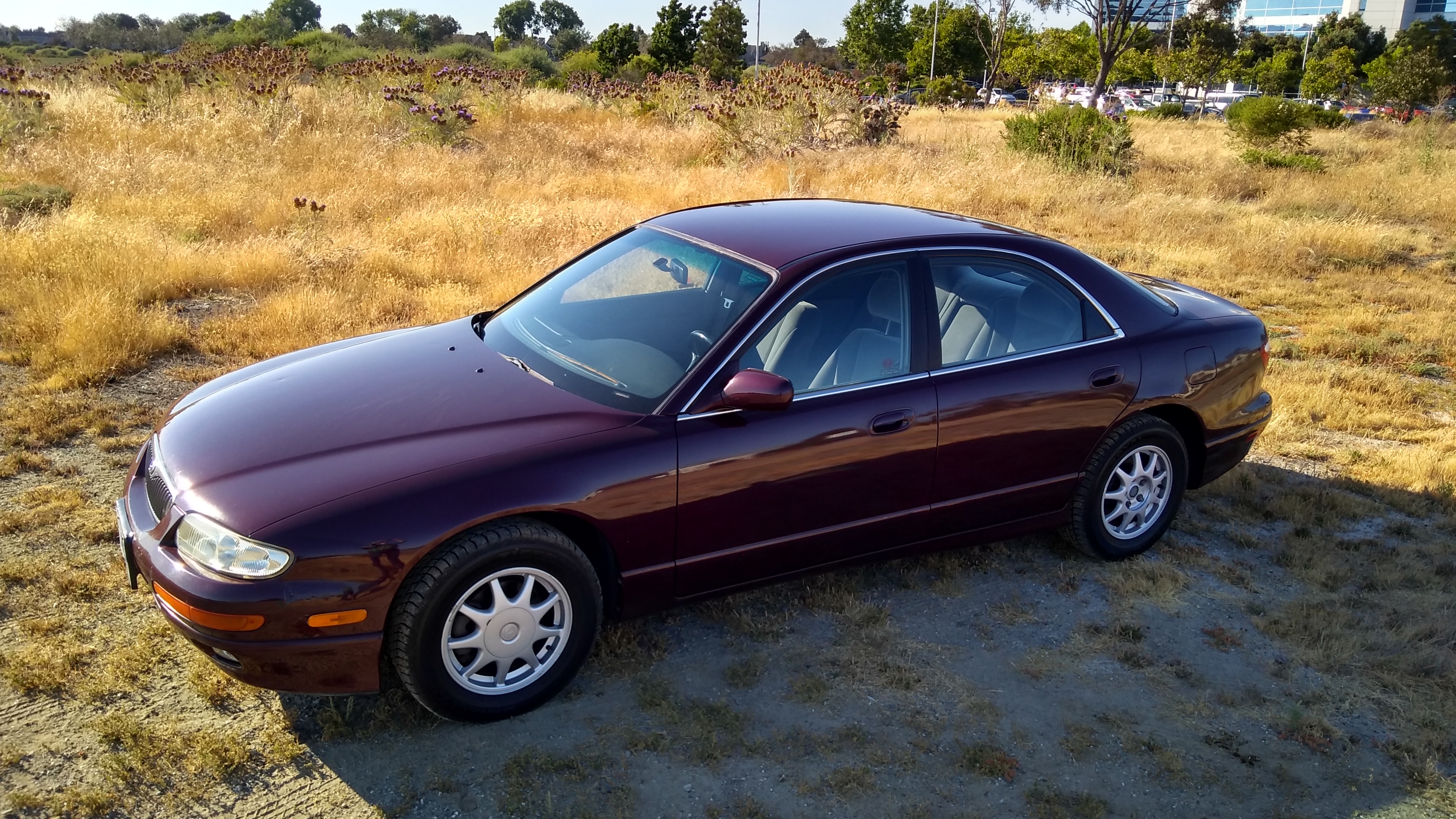
1995-1998 Mazda Millenia base (US)

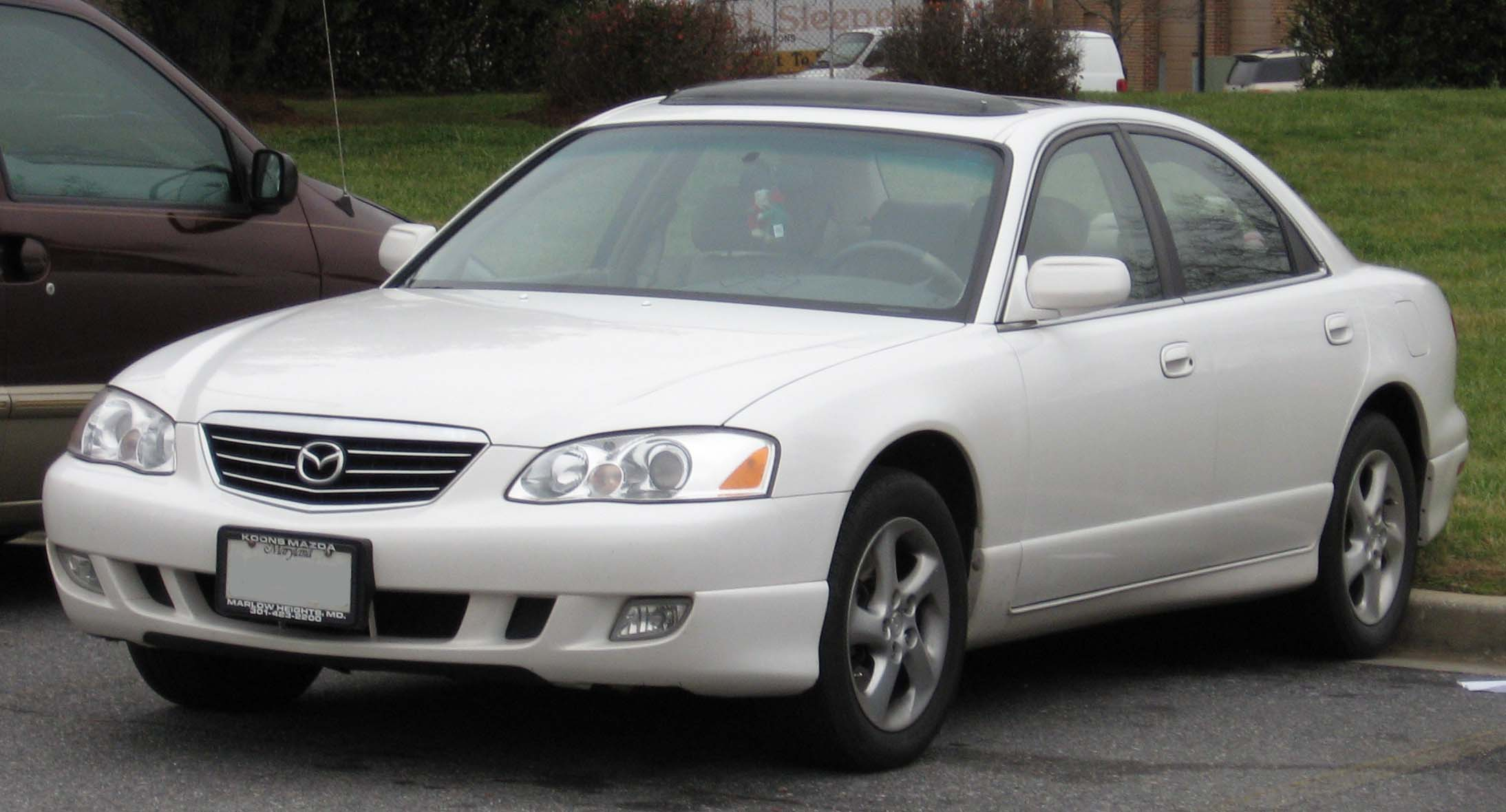
2001-2002 Mazda Millenia (US)

== Discontinuation ==
While production ceased in September 2002 with the final 35 units, in the United States there were still new Millenia sales reported as late as July 2004.

The Millenia did not have a direct predecessor or replacement in the Mazda product line. The end of production coincided with the introduction of the Mazda6 in 2002, which also served as replacement for Mazda's other, contemporaneous mid-sized sedan, the Mazda 626.

== Specifications and performance ==
| Specifications | Millenia S (and Millennium Edition) | Millenia L (and Base) |
|---|---|---|
| MSRP (2002) | $35,595 | $31,995 (Millenia L) |
| Engine Type | 2.3 Liter V6 | 2.5 Liter V6 |
| Engine Size | 2255 cc/2.3 L | 2497 cc/2.5 L |
| Horsepower | 210 hp (157 kW; 213 PS) at 5300 rpm | 170 hp (127 kW; 172 PS) at 5600 rpm |
| Torque | 210 lb⋅ft (285 N⋅m) at 3500 rpm | 160 ft⋅lbf (217 N⋅m) at 4000 rpm |
| Wheelbase/Width/Length | 108.3 in (2,751 mm)/69.7 in (1,770 mm)/189.8 in (4,821 mm) | |
| Transmission | Four-speed LJ4A-EL (Jatco RE4F04A) automatic | Four-speed 4-speed GF4A-EL automatic |
| Curb Weight | 3,410 lb (1,547 kg) | 3,232 lb (1,466 kg) |
| Fuel Type | Premium Unleaded | Premium Unleaded |
| Fuel Capacity | 18.0 US gal (68 L; 15 imp gal) | |
| Tires | P215/50R17 (2002) P215/55R16 (1995) | P215/65R15 (Millenia L, 2002) P205/65R15 (1995) |
| Brakes (F/R) | Disc (ABS)/Disc (ABS) | |
| Drivetrain | Front-engine/front-wheel-drive | |
| Vehicle Type | Five-passenger/four-door | |
| Domestic Content | 4% | unknown |
| Coefficient of Drag (Cd.) | 0.29 | |
| Performance | | |
| EPA Economy, miles per gallon city/highway/average | 20 mpg_{‑US} (12 L/100 km; 24 mpg_{‑imp})/28 mpg_{‑US} (8.4 L/100 km; 34 mpg_{‑imp})/23 mpg_{‑US} (10 L/100 km; 28 mpg_{‑imp}) | 20 mpg_{‑US} (12 L/100 km; 24 mpg_{‑imp})/27 mpg_{‑US} (8.7 L/100 km; 32 mpg_{‑imp})/22 mpg_{‑US} (11 L/100 km; 26 mpg_{‑imp}) |
| 0-60 mph (97 km/h) | 7.5 seconds | 9.9 seconds |
| 1/4 Mile (E.T.) | 15.8 seconds at 93.8 mph (151.0 km/h) | 17.3 seconds |
| Top Speed (Est.) | 142 mph (229 km/h) | 135 mph (217 km/h) |
