= Miller cycle =

Thermodynamic cycle

In engineering, the Miller cycle is a thermodynamic cycle used in a type of internal combustion engine. The Miller cycle was patented by Ralph Miller, an American engineer, U.S. patent 2,817,322 dated Dec 24, 1957. The engine may be two- or four-stroke and may be run on diesel fuel, gases, or dual fuel. It uses a supercharger or a turbocharger to offset the performance loss of the Atkinson cycle.

This type of engine was first used in ships and stationary power-generating plants, and is now used for some railway locomotives such as the GE PowerHaul. It was adapted by Mazda for their KJ-ZEM V6, used in the Millenia sedan, and in their Eunos 800 sedan (Australia) luxury cars. Subaru combined a Miller-cycle flat-4 with a hybrid driveline for their concept "Turbo Parallel Hybrid" car, known as the Subaru B5-TPH. Nissan introduced a small three-cylinder engine with variable intake valve timing that claims to operate an Atkinson cycle (still the same stroke lengths unlike James Atkinson's engines, in this context it means naturally aspirated Miller cycle) at low load (thus the lower power density is not a handicap) and a Miller cycle (same as before but with the supercharger engaging) when under light boost.

== Overview ==
A traditional reciprocating internal combustion engine uses four strokes, of which two can be considered high-power: the compression stroke (high power flow from crankshaft to the charge) and power stroke (high power flow from the combustion gases to crankshaft).

In the Miller cycle, the intake valve is left open longer than it would be in an Otto-cycle engine. In effect, the compression stroke is two discrete cycles: the initial portion when the intake valve is open and final portion when the intake valve is closed. This two-stage compression stroke creates the so-called "fifth" stroke that the Miller cycle introduces. As the piston initially moves upwards in what is traditionally the compression stroke, the charge is partially expelled back out through the still-open intake valve. Typically, this loss of charge air would result in a loss of power. However, in the Miller cycle, this is compensated for by the use of a supercharger. The supercharger typically will need to be of the positive-displacement (Roots or screw) type due to its ability to produce boost at relatively low engine speeds. Otherwise, low-speed power will suffer. Alternatively, a turbocharger can be used for greater efficiency, if low-speed operation is not required, or supplemented with electric motors.

In the Miller-cycle engine, the piston begins to compress the fuel-air mixture only after the intake valve closes; and the intake valve closes after the piston has traveled a certain distance above its bottom-most position: around 20 to 30% of the total piston travel of this upward stroke. So in the Miller cycle engine, the piston actually compresses the fuel-air mixture only during the latter 70% to 80% of the compression stroke. During the initial part of the compression stroke, the piston pushes part of the fuel-air mixture through the still-open intake valve, and back into the intake manifold.

=== Charge temperature ===
The charge air is compressed using a supercharger (and cooled by an intercooler) to a pressure higher than that needed for the engine cycle, but filling of the cylinders is reduced by suitable timing of the inlet valve. Thus the expansion of the air and the consequent cooling take place in the cylinders and partially in the inlet. Reducing the temperature of the air/fuel charge allows the power of a given engine to be increased without making any major changes such as increasing the cylinder/piston compression relationship. When the temperature is lower at the beginning of the cycle, the air density is increased without a change in pressure (the mechanical limit of the engine is shifted to a higher power). At the same time, the thermal load limit shifts due to the lower mean temperatures of the cycle.

This allows ignition timing to be advanced beyond what is normally allowed before the onset of detonation, thus increasing the overall efficiency still further. An additional advantage of the lower final charge temperature is that the emission of NOx in diesel engines is decreased, which is an important design parameter in large diesel engines on board ships and power plants.

=== Compression ratio ===
Efficiency is increased by having the same effective compression ratio and a larger expansion ratio. This allows more work to be extracted from the expanding gases as they are expanded almost to atmospheric pressure. In an ordinary spark ignition engine at the end of the expansion stroke of a wide open throttle cycle, the gases are at around five atmospheres when the exhaust valve opens. Because the stroke is limited to that of the compression, still some work could be extracted from the gas. Delaying the closing of the intake valve in the Miller cycle in effect shortens the compression stroke compared to the expansion stroke. This allows the gases to be expanded to atmospheric pressure, increasing the efficiency of the cycle.

=== Supercharger losses or turbocharger lag ===
The benefits of using positive-displacement superchargers come with a cost due to parasitic load. About 15 to 20% of the power generated by a supercharged engine is usually required to do the work of driving the supercharger, which compresses the intake charge (also known as boost). On the other hand while turbochargers aren't as high in terms of being a parasitic load, the spooling up of the turbine from the exhaust gases would result in the engine being stuck in the Atkinson cycle at lower RPM. This inconsistency could in principle be addressed with techniques like the MGU-H that was used in Formula 1 but this has never been implemented on commercial engines and much less specifically on Atkinson cycle engines.

=== Major advantage/drawback ===
The major advantage of the cycle is that the expansion ratio is greater than the compression ratio. By intercooling after the external supercharging, an opportunity exists to reduce NOx emissions for diesel, or knock for spark ignition engines. However, multiple tradeoffs on boosting system efficiency and friction (due to the larger displacement) need to be balanced for every application.

== Summary of the patent ==
The overview given above may describe a modern version of the Miller cycle, but it differs in some respects from the 1957 patent. The patent describes "a new and improved method of operating a supercharged intercooled engine". The engine may be two-cycle or four-cycle and the fuel may be diesel, dual fuel, or gas. It is clear from the context that "gas" means gaseous fuel and not gasoline. The pressure-charger shown in the diagrams is a turbocharger, not a positive-displacement supercharger. The engine (whether four-stroke or two-stroke) has a conventional valve or port layout, but an additional "compression control valve" (CCV) is in the cylinder head. The servo mechanism, operated by inlet manifold pressure, controls the lift of the CCV during part of the compression stroke and releases air from the cylinder to the exhaust manifold. The CCV would have maximum lift at full load and minimum lift at no load. The effect is to produce an engine with a variable compression ratio. As inlet manifold pressure goes up (because of the action of the turbocharger) the effective compression ratio in the cylinder goes down (because of the increased lift of the CCV) and vice versa. This "will insure proper starting and ignition of the fuel at light loads".

== Atkinson-cycle engine ==
A similar delayed valve-closing method is used in some modern versions of Atkinson cycle engines, but without the supercharging. These engines are generally found on hybrid electric vehicles, where efficiency is the goal, and the power lost compared to the Miller cycle is made up through the use of electric motors.
