= Eunos (automobile) =

Former automobile marque

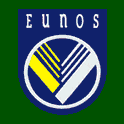
- Company type: Division
- Industry: Automotive
- Founded: 1989
- Defunct: 1996
- Fate: Defunct
- Headquarters: Hiroshima, Japan
- Area served: Japan; Australia
- Products: Automobiles
- Parent: Mazda

Eunos (ユーノス, Yūnosu) was a marque of Japanese automaker Mazda, marketed as its upscale, fun to drive line. The brand existed in Japan from 1989 to 1996, when sales operations were integrated into ɛ̃fini, and Australia from 1992 to 1996, when it was integrated into the main Mazda model range as a premium sub-brand.

== History ==
In the late 1980s, Mazda diversified in the Japan market with the launch of three new marques. The company created Autozam, Eunos, and ɛ̃fini, in addition to the Mazda and Ford brands already marketed by it there.

The Eunos marque, was marketed as a fun to drive, upscale brand compared to entry level Autozam, traditional Mazda products, and exclusive luxury brand ɛ̃fini. The name was derived for the ancient Greek "eu" meaning "good" and "nos", an abbreviation of "numbers" in English, meant to signify a number, or assortment, of good things. The Marque was launched in Japan with the Eunos 500 in January, 1992 and many of the vehicles created were exported to other markets.

From 1991 until 1996, when the Eunos dealership was integrated into Mazda locations, Citroën products were sold to Japanese buyers, as well as Mazda's ɛ̃fini locations.

This experiment was ended in the mid-1990s. Some of the vehicles sold under the Eunos brand were intended to be sold in North America under the Amati brand, but due to economic conditions, largely attributed to the collapse of the Japanese asset price bubble in 1991, Amati was not launched.

The Eunos name was brought back in 2020 for a limited edition of the Mazda MX-5 in France as the MX-5 Eunos Edition, a nod to how the original MX-5 was sold as the Eunos Roadster in Japan.

== Vehicles ==
Eunos sold the following vehicles, all on common Mazda platforms:

- 1989 Eunos 100 (BG Mazda Familia)
- 1994 Mazda Lantis (CB)
- 1989 Eunos 300 (MA Mazda Persona)
- 1992–1993 Eunos 500 (CA Mazda Xedos 6)
- 1993–1996 Eunos 800 (TA Mazda Xedos 9/Mazda Millenia)
- 1990 Eunos Cargo (SS platform)
- 1990–1995 Eunos Cosmo (JC Mazda Cosmo)
- 1991–1993 Eunos Presso/30X (EC Mazda MX-3)
- 1989–1997 Eunos Roadster (NA Mazda MX-5)

== Gallery ==
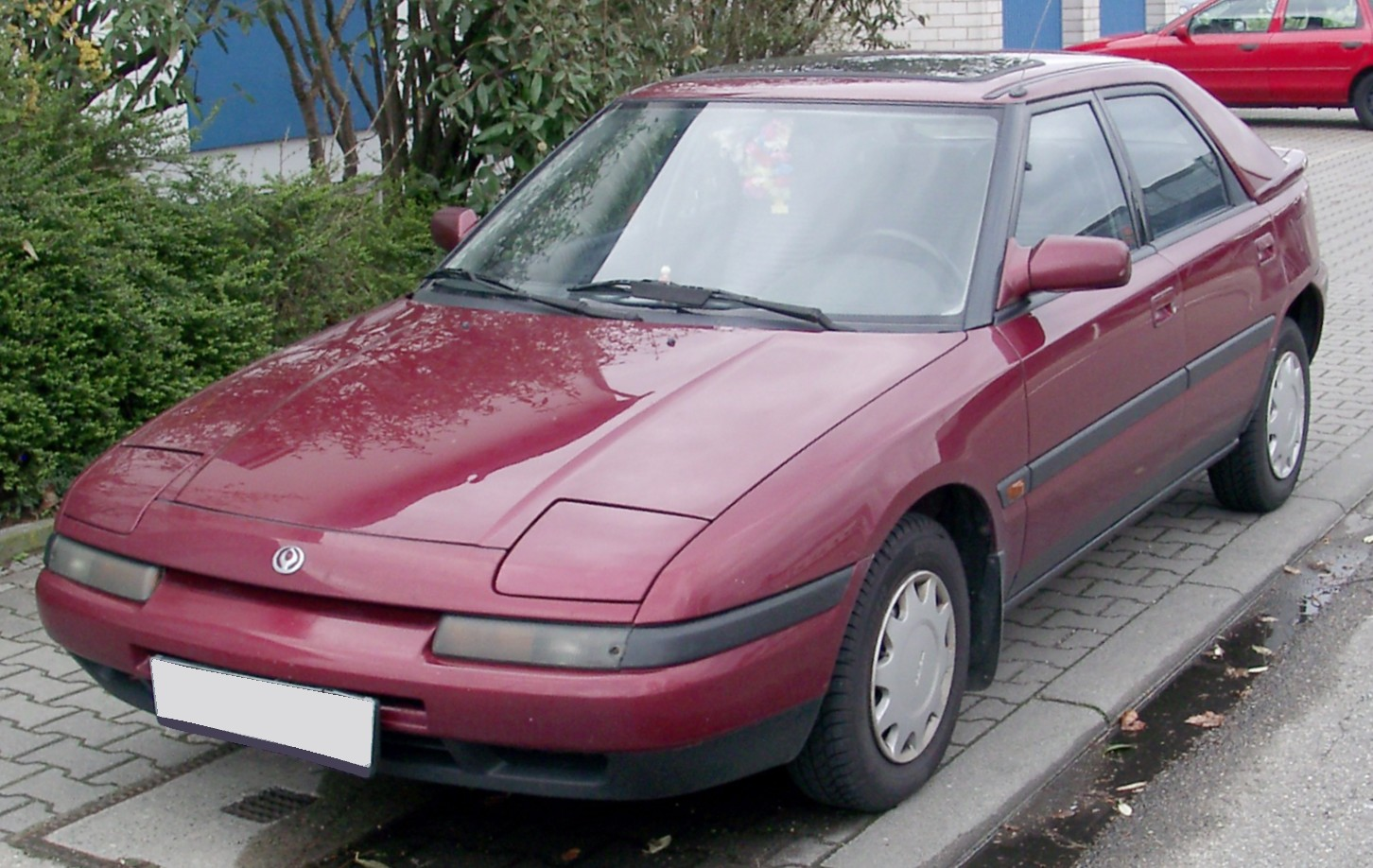
1989 Eunos 100

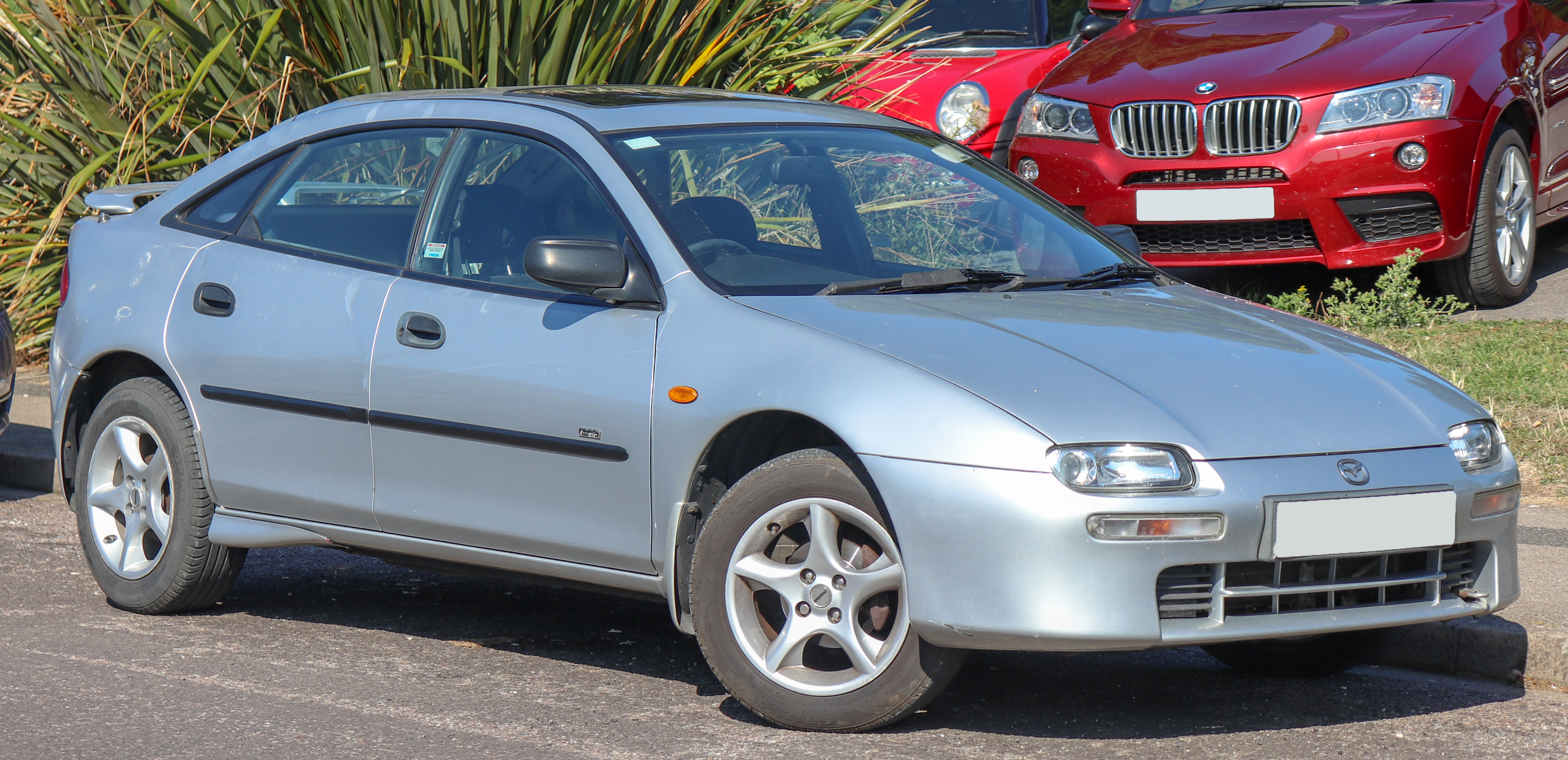
Mazda Lantis

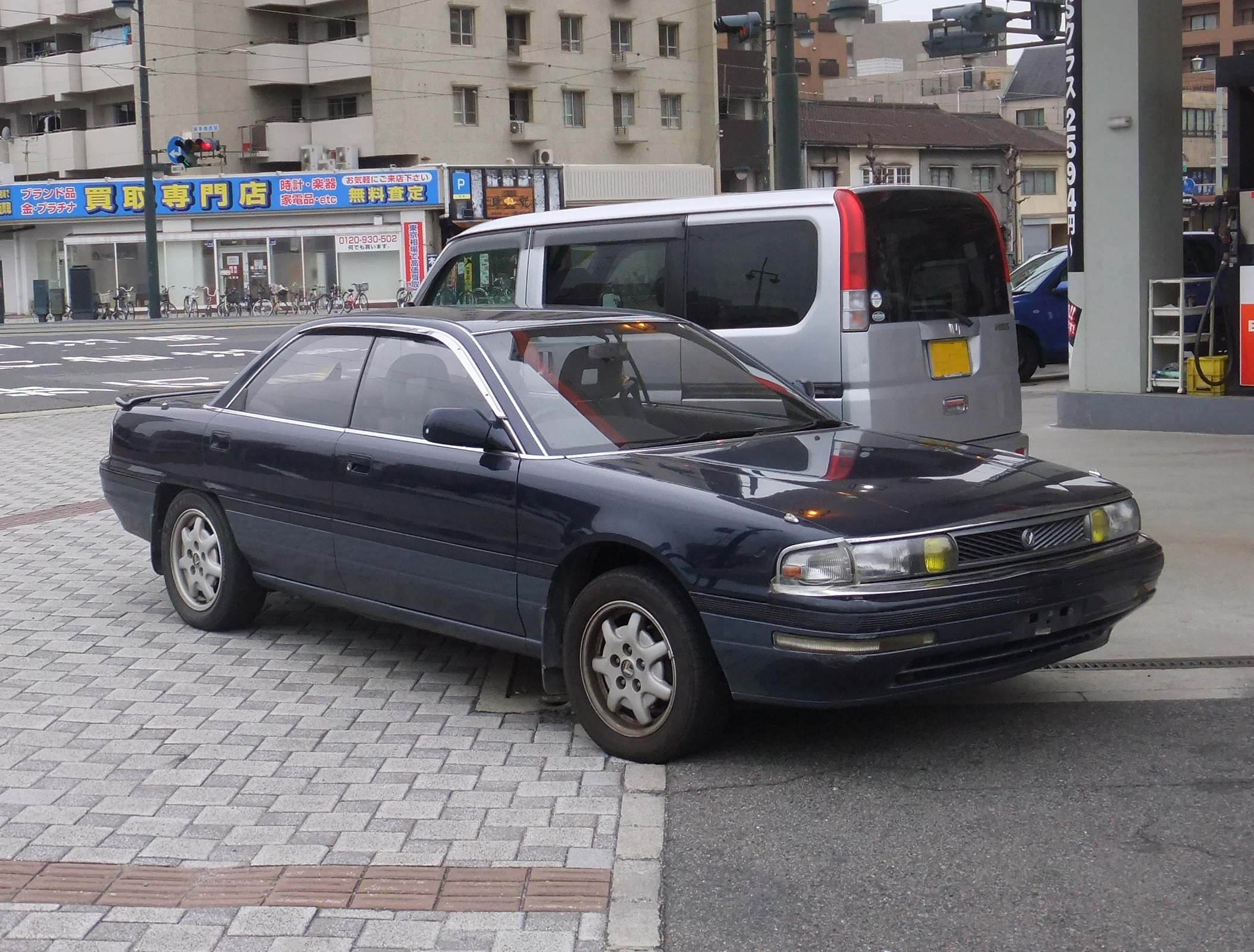
Eunos 300

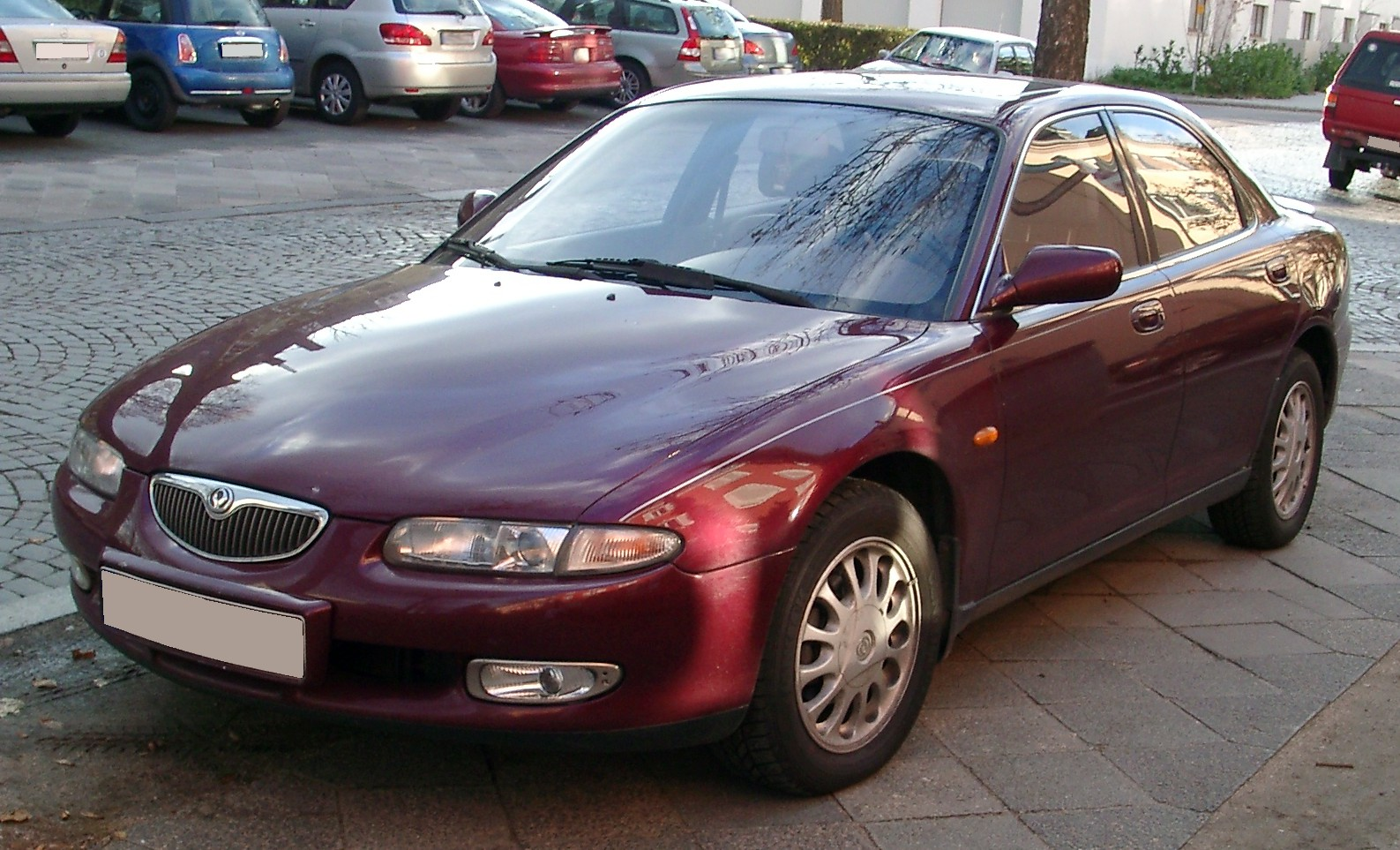
Eunos 500

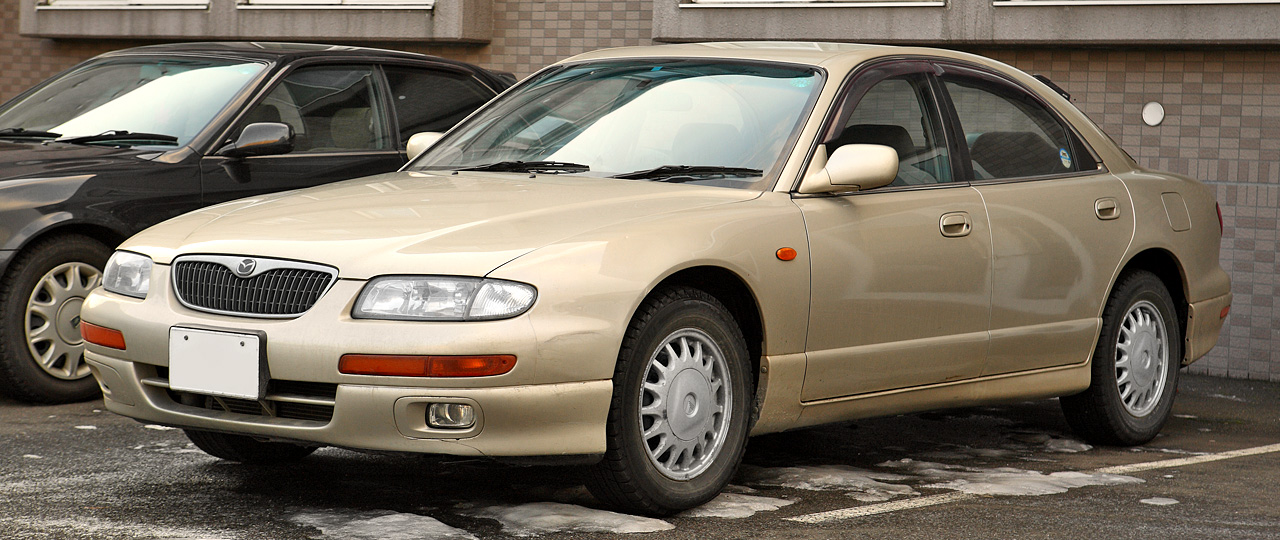
Eunos 800

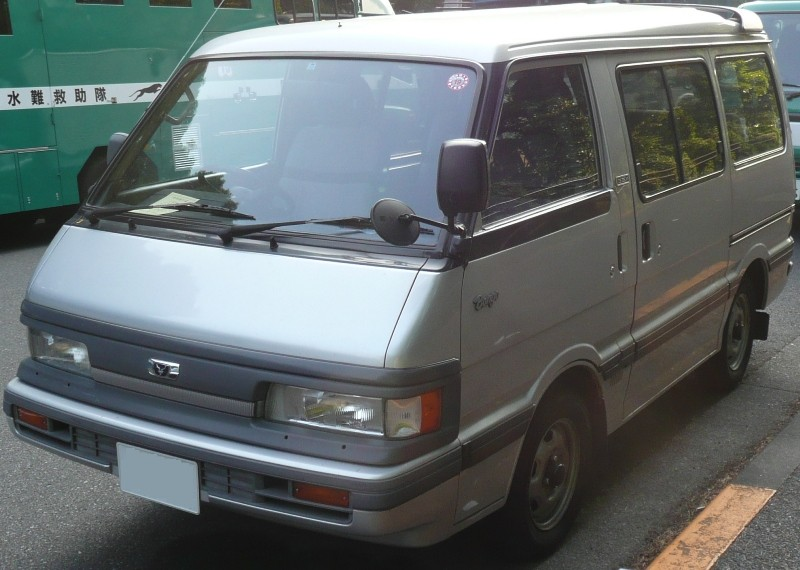
Eunos Cargo

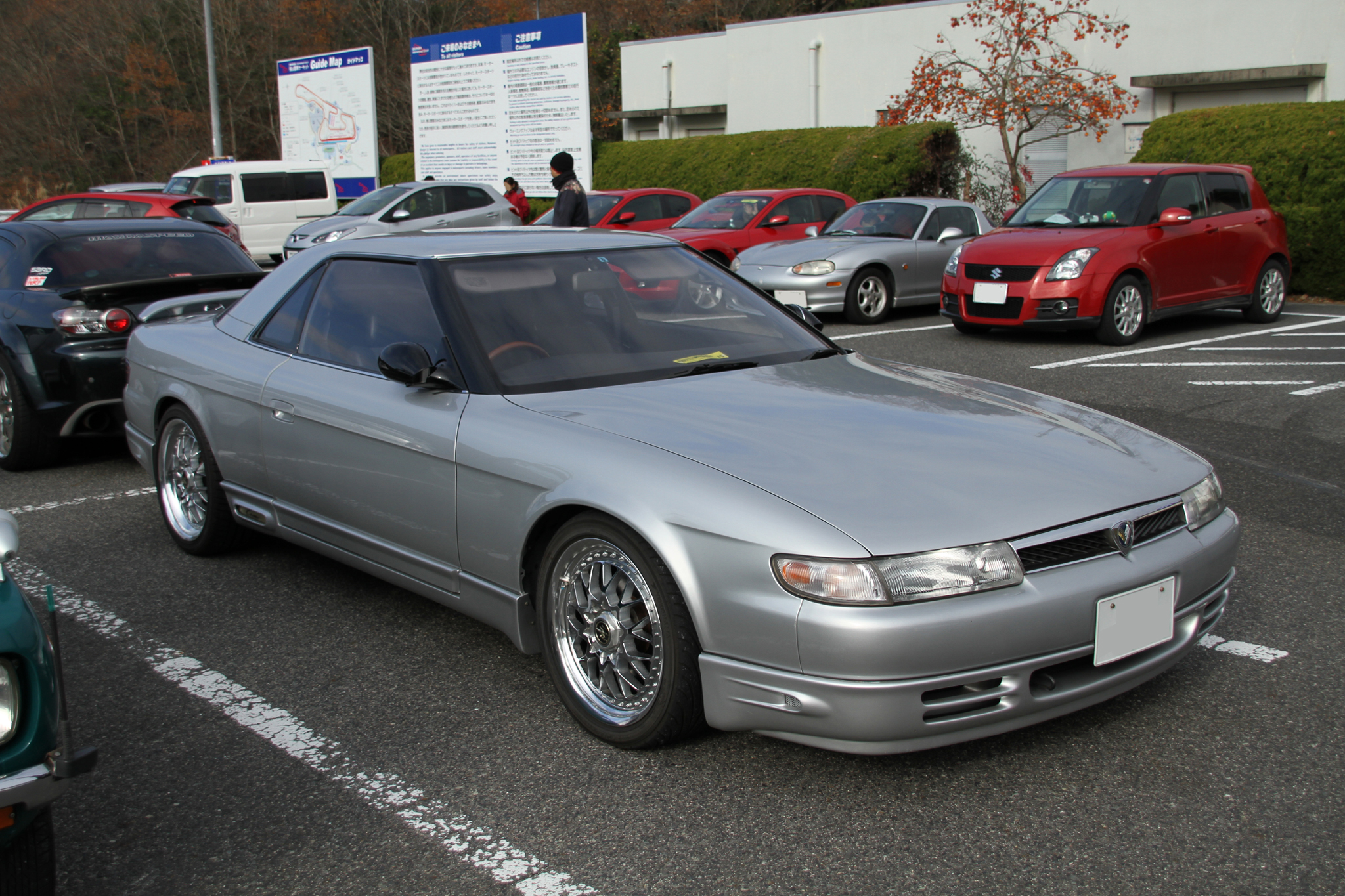
Eunos Cosmo

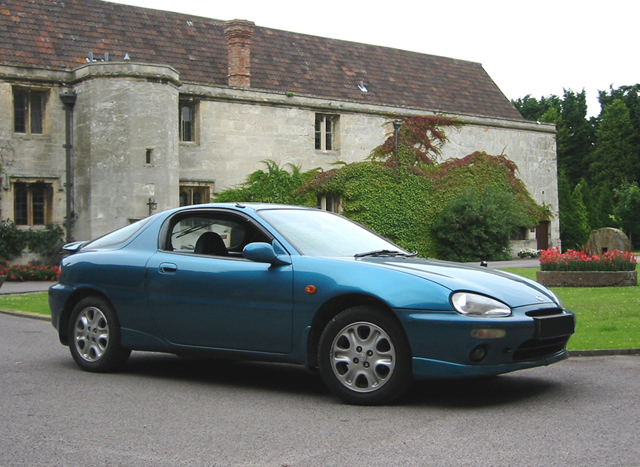
Eunos Presso

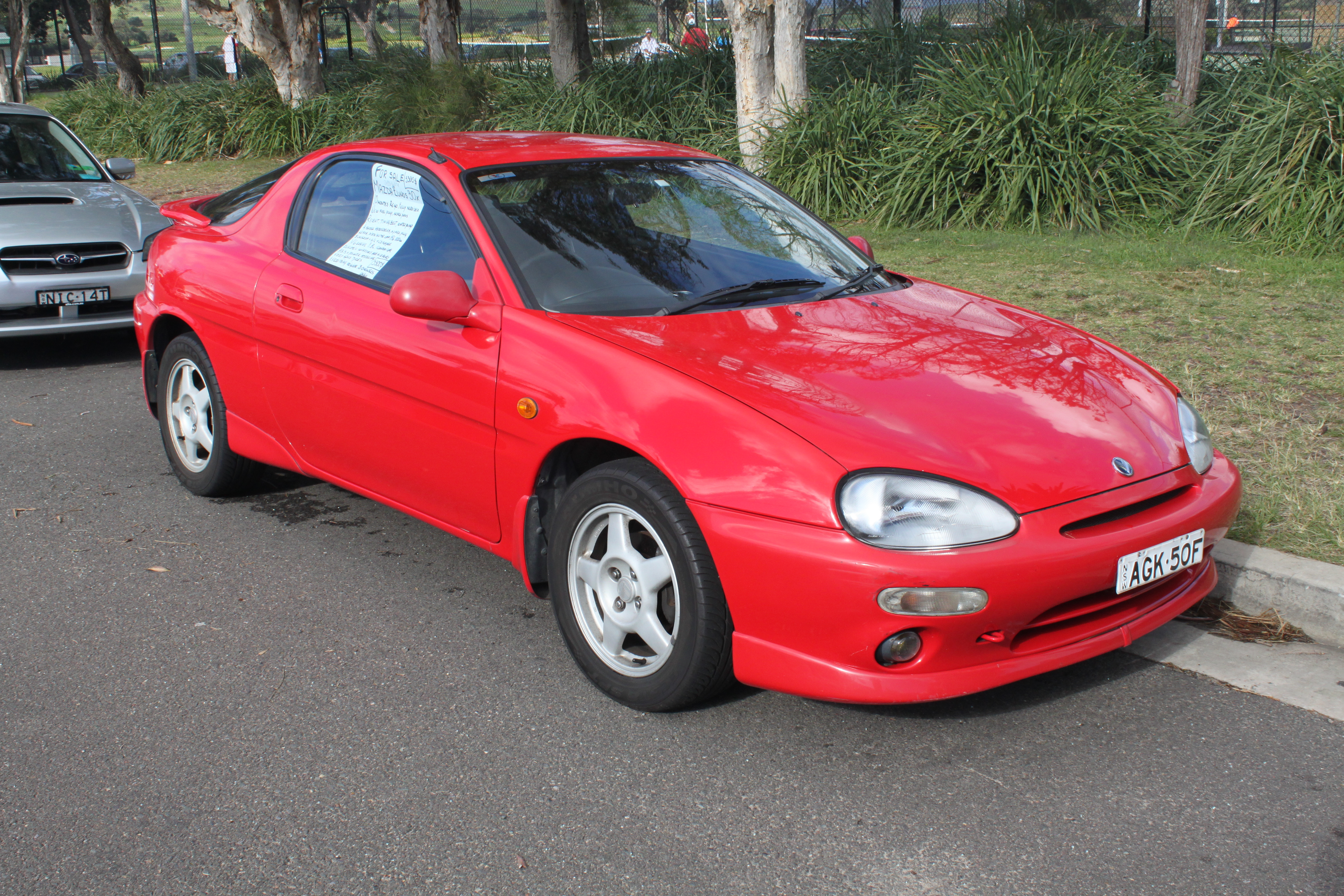
Eunos 30X

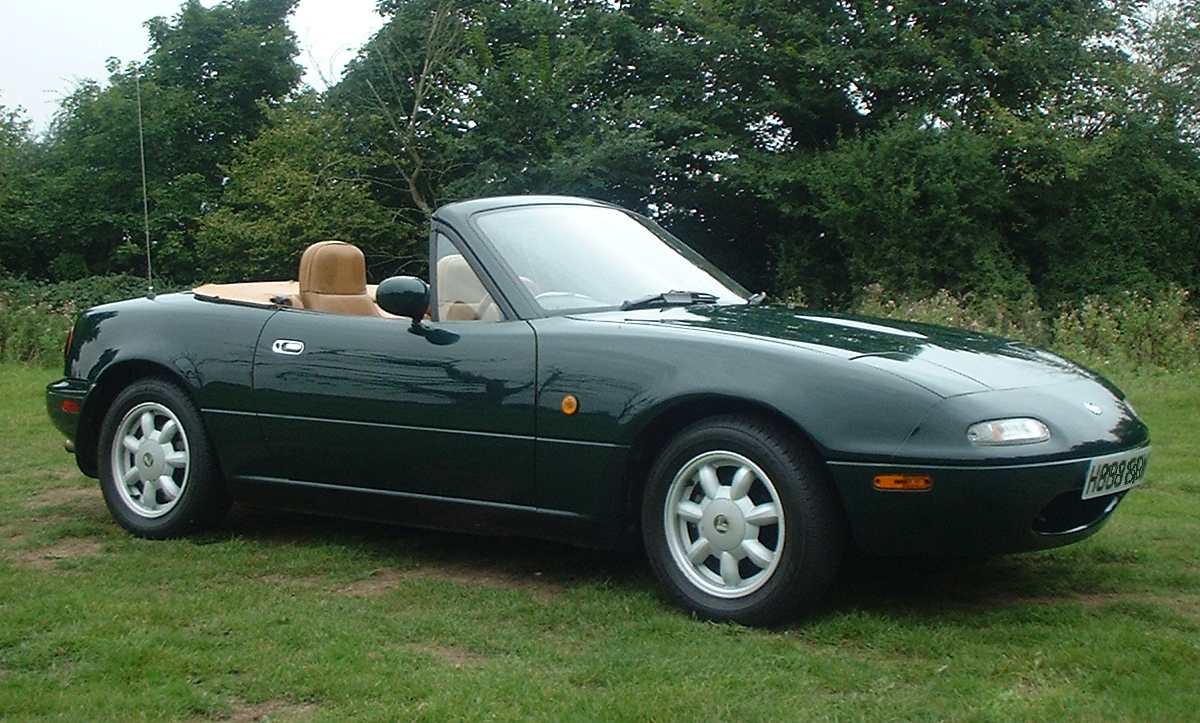
Eunos Roadster
