= Mazda Xedos 6 =

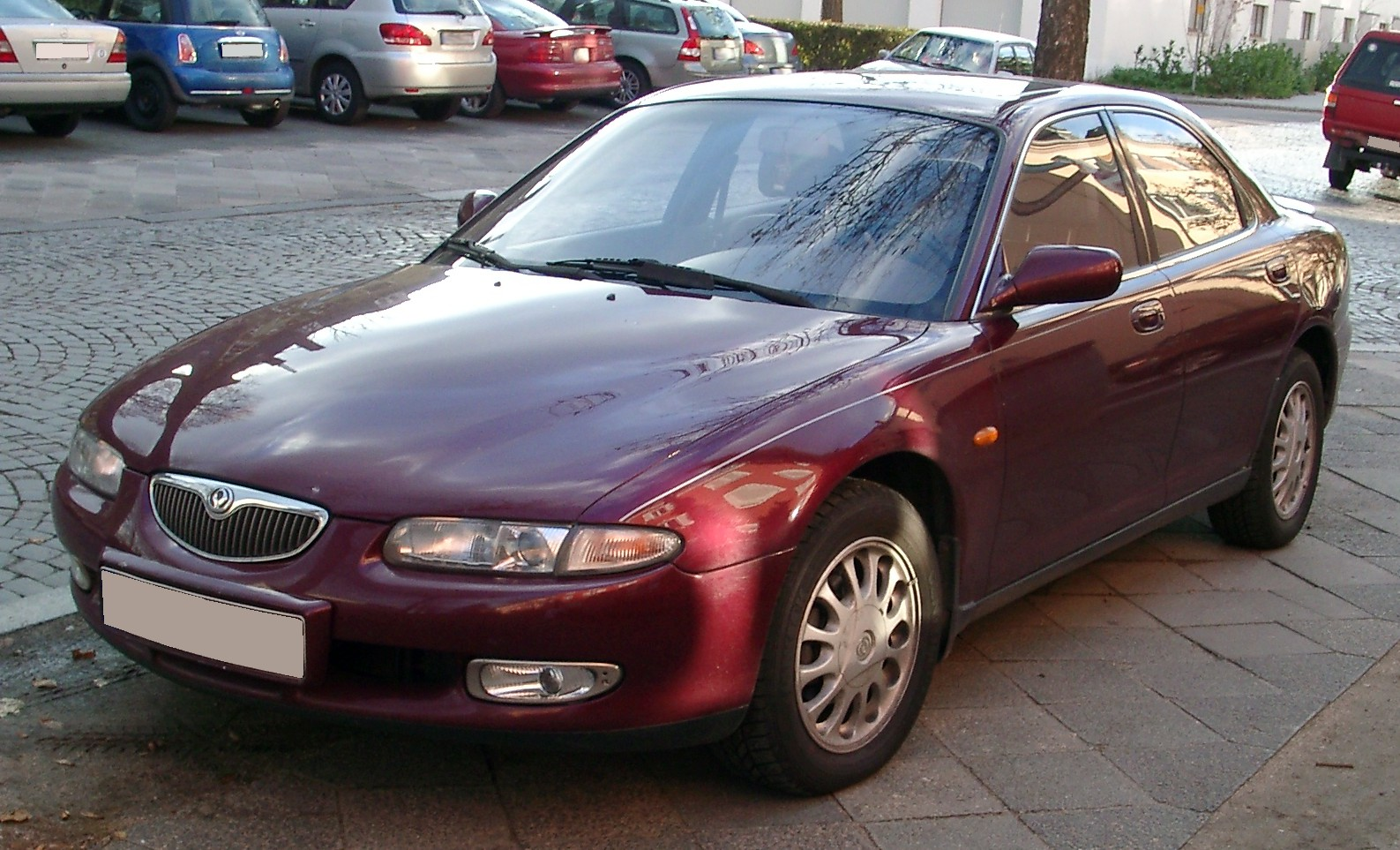

Overview
- Manufacturer: Mazda
- Model code: CA
- Also called: Eunos 500; Mazda Eunos 500 (Australia)
- Production: 1992–1999
- Assembly: Japan: Hofu, Yamaguchi (Hofu Plant)
- Designer: Takeshi Arakawa (1989)

Body and chassis
- Class: Compact executive car
- Body style: 4-door sedan
- Layout: FF layout
- Related: Mazda Capella; Mazda MX-6

Powertrain
- Engine: 1.6 L B6-9/B6-E I4; 1.8 L FP-DE I4; 1.8 L K8-ZE V6; 2.0 L KF-1/KF-ZE V6
- Transmission: 5-speed manual 4-speed automatic

Dimensions
- Wheelbase: 2,610 mm (102.8 in)
- Length: 4,560 mm (179.5 in)
- Width: 1,700 mm (66.9 in)
- Height: 1,345–1,355 mm (53.0–53.3 in)
- Curb weight: 1,140–1,296 kg (2,513–2,857 lb)

The Mazda Xedos 6 and Eunos 500 are compact executive cars that were produced between 1992 and 1999, with the Xedos 6 being sold in Europe by Mazda, and the Eunos 500 being sold in Japan and Australia by Eunos. The cars were not sold in North America, with the larger Xedos 9/Millenia model offered there instead. In total, 72,101 Xedos 6 and Eunos 500 automobiles were produced.

== History ==
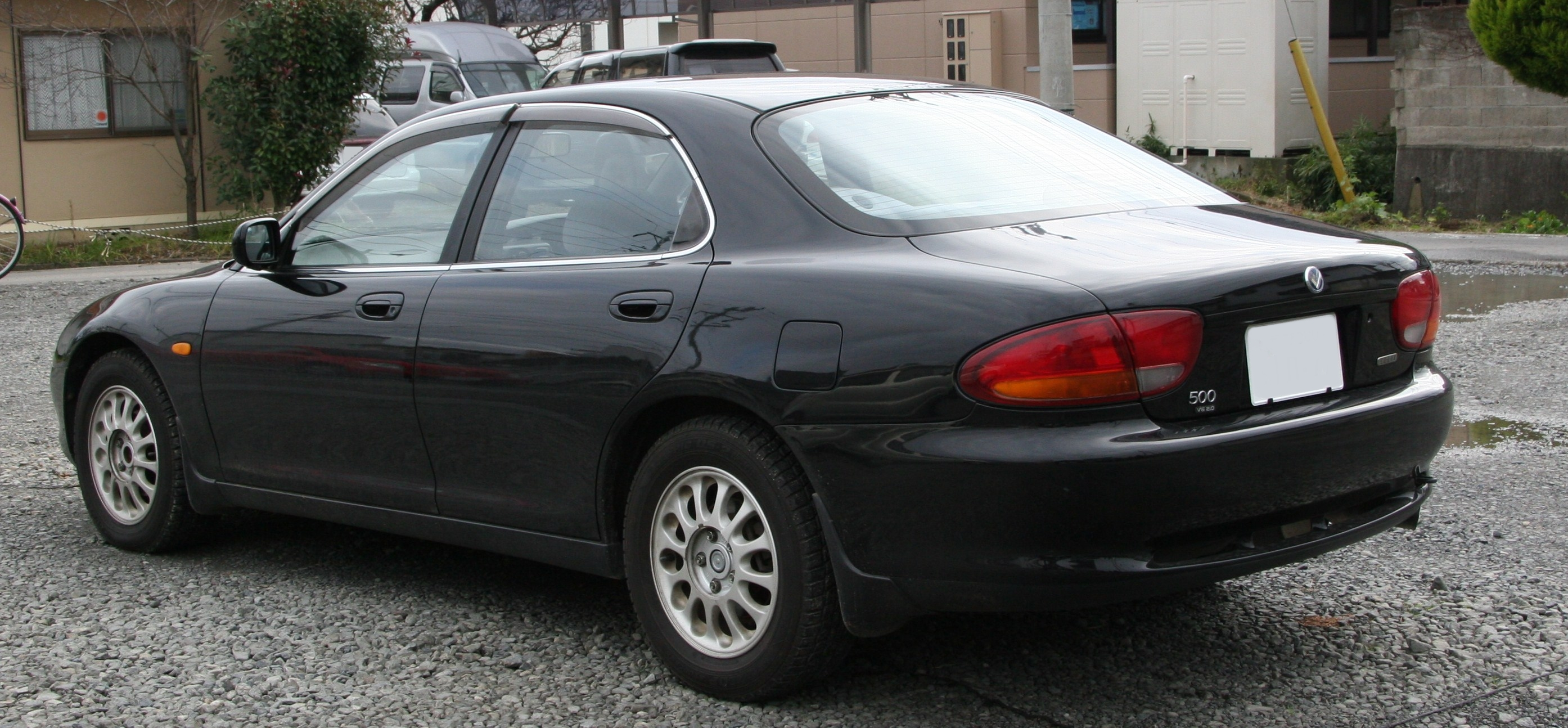
The rear of a Eunos 500.

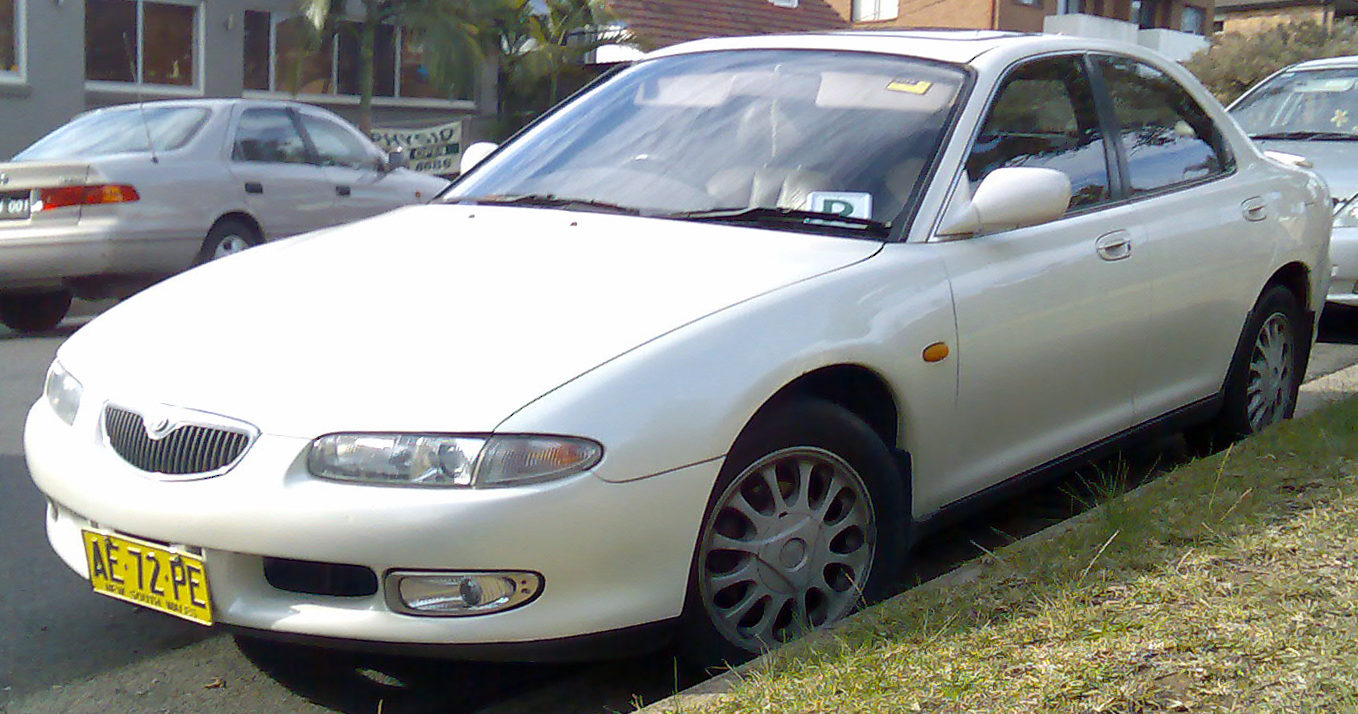
1992-1996 Eunos 500 (Australia)

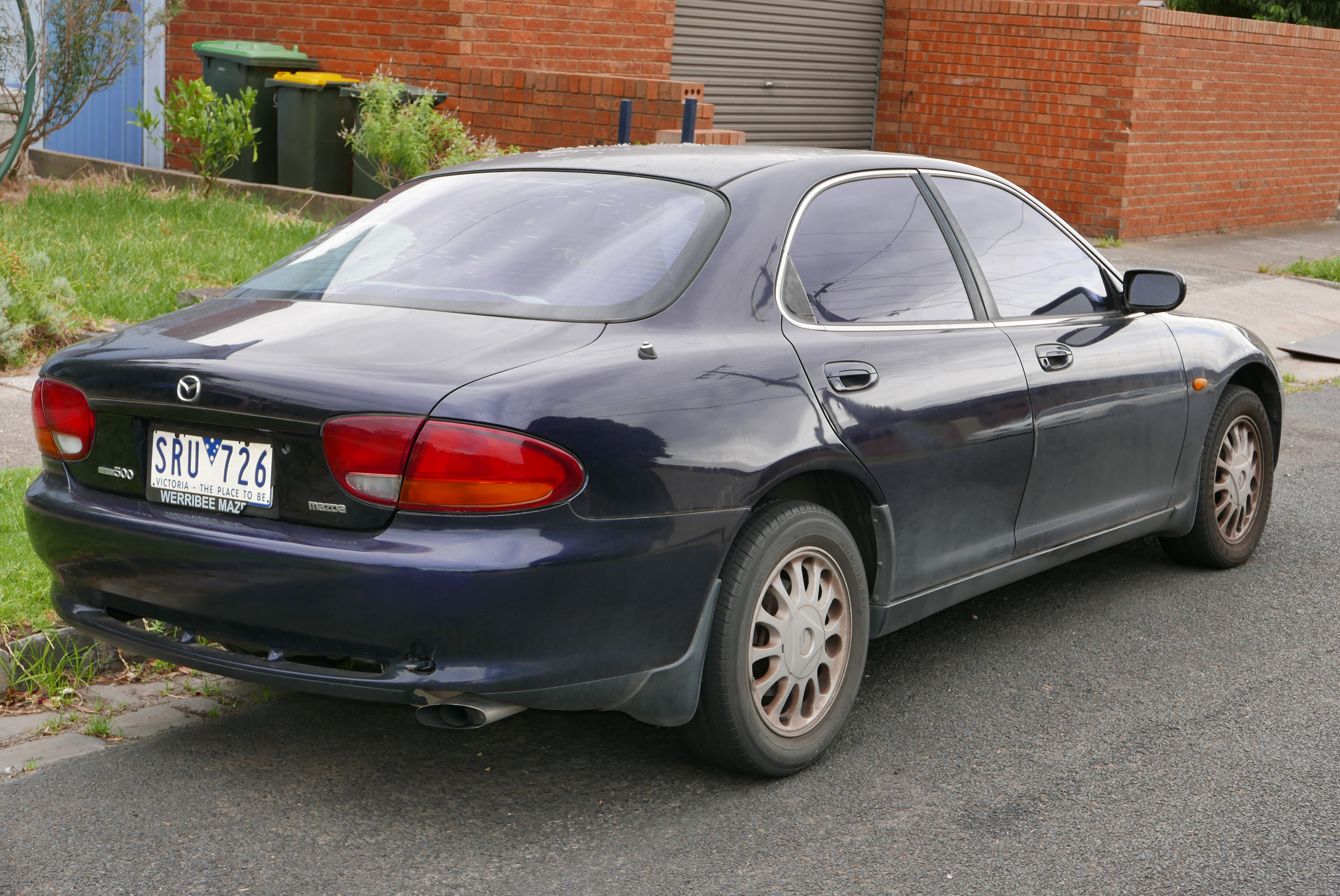
1998 Mazda Eunos 500

The Eunos 500 was initially presented at the 1991 Tokyo Motor Show, and was based on the Mazda CA platform, also used by the Mazda Capella. The car entered full production in January 1992, with Japanese, Hong Kong and Australian market models using the Eunos 500 name (as they were sold under the Eunos brand, and not the Mazda brand) and British models utilizing the Mazda Xedos 6 name. Left-hand drive versions of the Xedos 6, destined for mainland Europe, were first produced in 1993. The car's exterior styling was often praised by reviewers, with Honest John stating that it "could have been the prototype for a new small Jaguar - with Mazda reliability," however, the interior was also criticized for being too dull. There were also plans to market the car under the Amati 300 name, but they did not come to fruition.

The Xedos 6 was available with two different engines: a 1.6-litre straight-four (available in Europe from the beginning of production, in the UK from 1993 onwards) and a 2-litre V6 (available everywhere from the car's launch) The 1.6-litre engine produced 114 hp (85 kW; 116 PS), and was criticized for being underpowered, whilst the 2-litre engine produced 144 hp (107 kW; 146 PS), and was praised for its smooth, free-revving nature. The V6 models were capable of up to 133 mph (214 km/h) with a manual transmission, and 125 mph (201 km/h) with an automatic transmission, and were claimed to be able to do 30-31 miles per gallon (imperial). In comparison, the 1.6-litre models had a top speed of 184 km/h (114 mph) with a manual transmission, or 175 km/h (109 mph) with an automatic. The engines were updated in 1994 to meet the new Euro 1 emissions standards (reducing the power outputs by 7 hp (5 kW; 7 PS) for the 1.6 and 4 hp (3 kW; 4 PS) for the 2-litre,) and again in 1996 to meet the new Euro 2 standards. The 1.6-litre versions, as well as the 2.0 Sport model, were withdrawn from production in 1998, a year before the remaining versions were withdrawn.

The Eunos 500 used different engines to the European models. The 1.6-litre engine was not offered in Japan, with the base model instead being a 1.8-litre K8-ZE V6, producing 140 PS (103 kW; 138 hp) and having a top speed of 195 km/h (121 mph). The 2-litre V6 was offered in Japan, but in a higher state of tune; Japanese models produced 160 PS (118 kW; 158 hp) from their KF-ZE engines, and had a top speed of 205 km/h (127 mph). For 1994, a 1.8-litre straight-four was introduced as the new base model, with a power output of 115 PS (85 kW; 113 hp), whilst the 1.8-litre V6 was discontinued. In 1996, following Mazda's decision to axe the Eunos brand, the Eunos 500 was rebranded as the Mazda Eunos 500, and remained in production under that name until 1999.

== Motorsport ==
The Xedos 6 was used in the British Touring Car Championship in 1993 and 1994. Roger Dowson Engineering ran the works Mazda team in 1993 (under the Mazda Racing Team name,) with the Xedos 6 replacing the 323F that had been used in the previous season. Patrick Watts drove the Xedos 6 during the season, taking his first pole at Snetterton, and three fourth-place finishes. He finished 15th in the championship, two points behind former champion Tim Harvey in the works Renault 19. Mazda were classified eighth, and last, in the manufacturer's championship. For 1994, Roger Dowson Engineering and Team Dynamics ran the works Mazdas, with David Leslie and Matt Neal being entered in a two-car team, but the season would prove to be less successful. Neal was forced to withdraw from the series after suffering injuries from a big crash in the sixth round at Silverstone, whilst Leslie withdrew halfway through the season due to budgetary problems. Leslie's best finishes were a pair of eighth positions at the first two rounds, whilst Neal's was a tenth at Snetterton. Neal finished 23rd in the championship, level with privateers James Thompson and Nigel Smith, whilst Leslie finished 20th. Mazda were classified tenth, and last, in the manufacturer's championship. The Xedos 6's running gear was later used in a 323F built for the 1994 FIA Touring Car World Cup and driven by Neal.

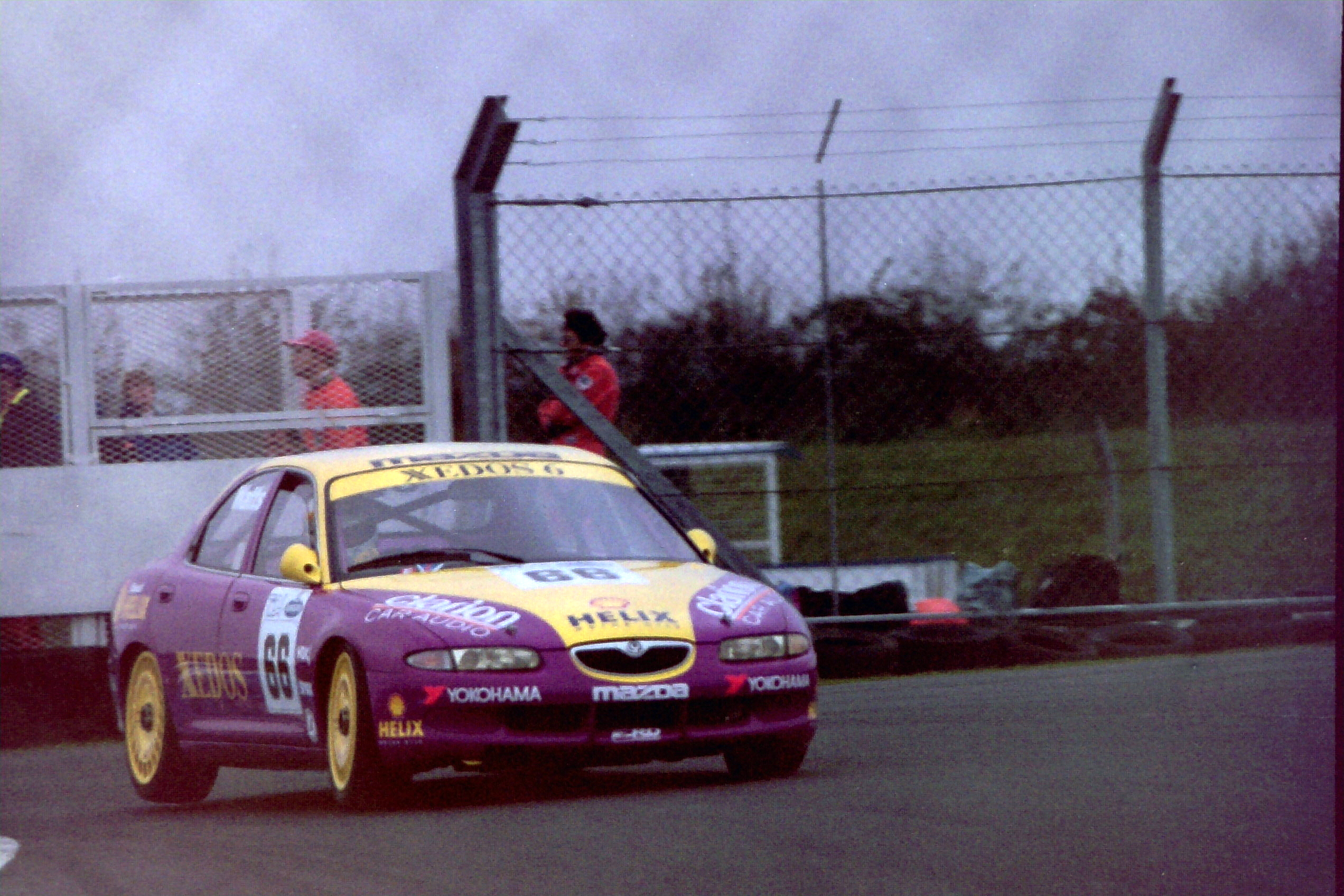
Patrick Watts driving his Mazda Xedos at Donington Park during the 1993 TOCA Shootout.

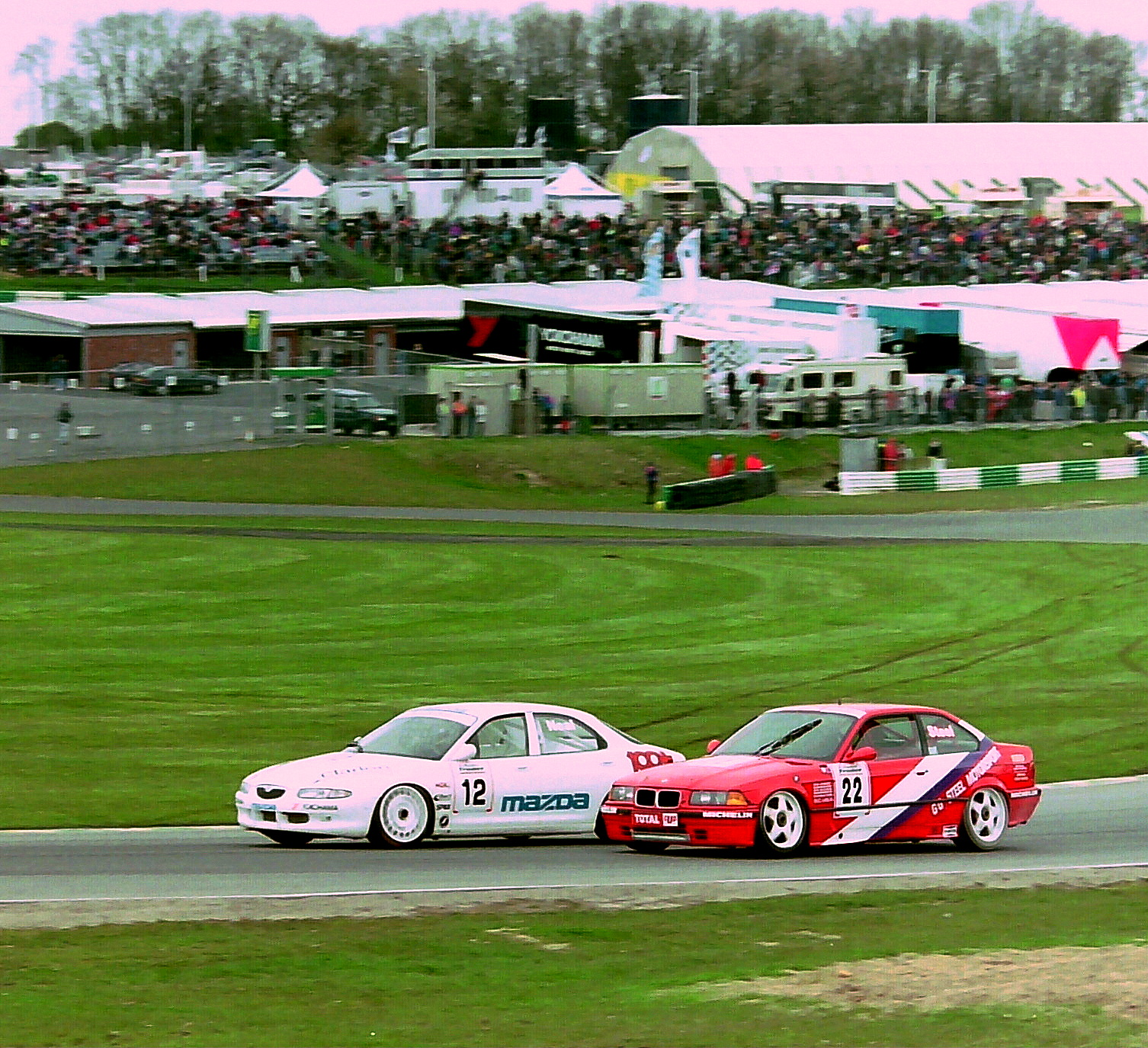
Matt Neal (Mazda Xedos) disputing a position with Geoff Steel (BMW 318is) at Brands Hatch during the 1994 British Touring Car Championship.
