= Amati Cars =

Cancelled Mazda luxury automotive brand

Amati
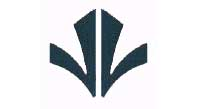
- Company type: Division
- Industry: Automotive
- Founded: 1988
- Defunct: 1992
- Headquarters: Irvine, California
- Key people: Dick Colliver (president)
- Products: Luxury vehicles
- Parent: Mazda

Amati was a proposed luxury brand announced by Mazda in August 1991 as part of Mazda's expansion plan with the launch of the Autozam, Eunos, and ɛ̃fini marques in hopes of becoming Japan's 3rd largest automaker. It was scheduled to launch in 1994 as a competitor to fellow Japanese luxury car marques Acura, Infiniti and Lexus as well as American and European luxury vehicles. However, when the Japanese economy collapsed in early 1992 Mazda faced a liquidity shortage and was unable to complete development of the brand. Mazda announced the cancellation of the Amati brand in October 1992 and the completed vehicles were sold under Mazda's existing brand names.

== History ==
=== Background ===
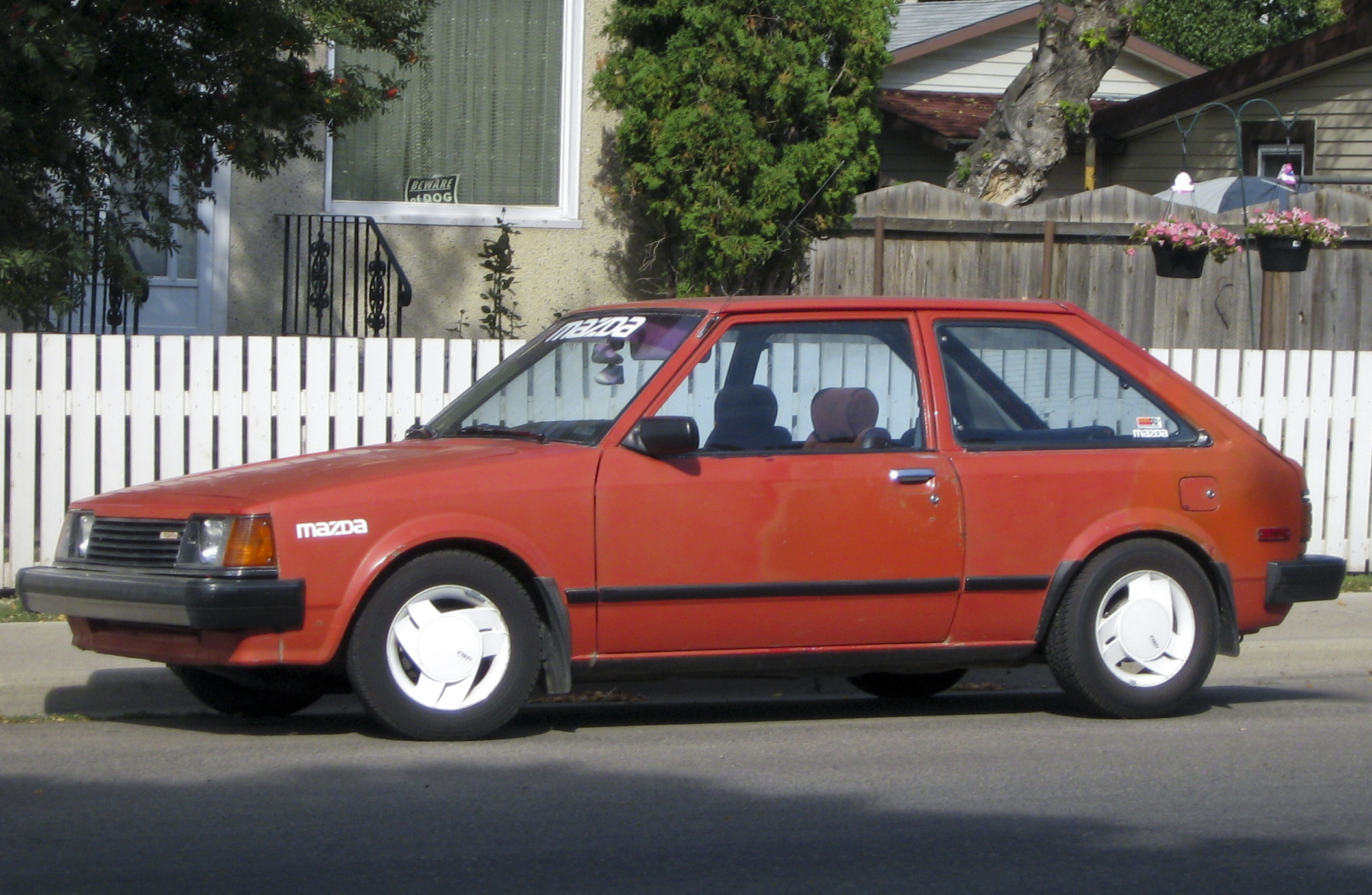
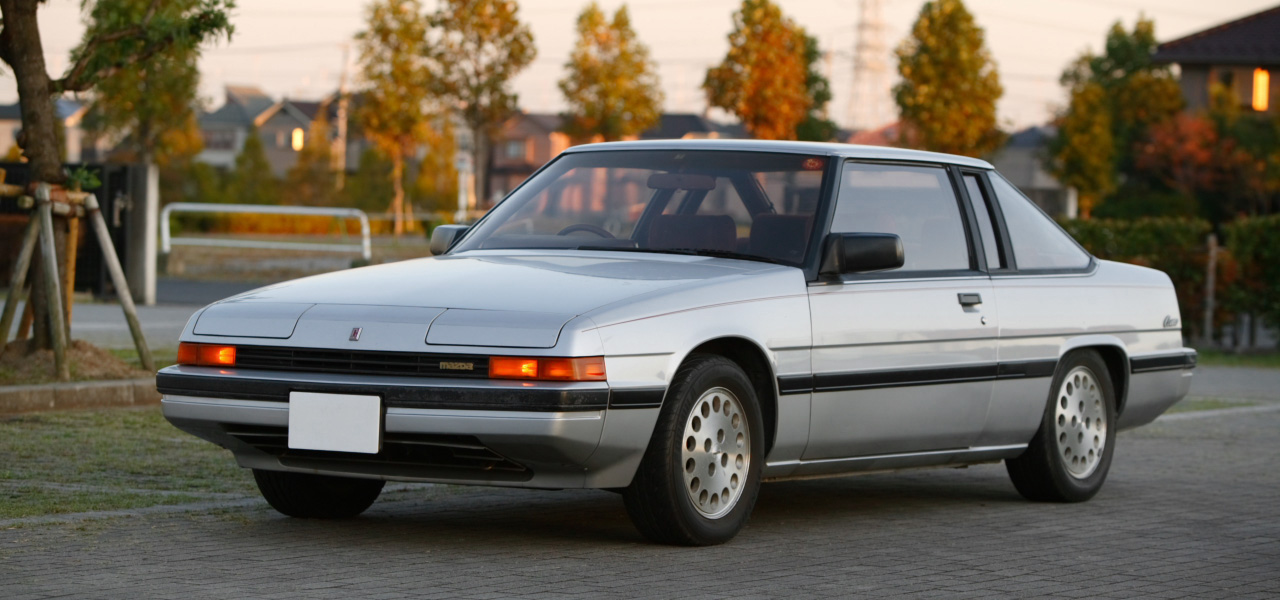
Export restrictions, and a growing demand for more luxurious vehicles within the Japanese domestic market, combined with a nearly bottomless supply of capital from the Japanese asset price bubble led Japanese automakers in the 1980s to focus less on building low-priced economy cars such as this 1983 Mazda 323 (left) and produce more luxurious, expensive and exotic vehicles such as this 1984 Mazda Cosmo (right)

Japanese automobiles began increasing in popularity in the United States during the 1970s as the market shifted towards small, economical cars following the 1973 oil crisis. Since the major American manufacturers General Motors, Ford Motor Company, Chrysler and American Motors (AMC) were ill-prepared for the shift, they began losing market share to Japanese manufacturers for the first time. By the end of the decade, Ford, Chrysler and AMC were in dire financial straits and were downsizing to try to stay afloat. Chrysler sought a government bailout with CEO Lee Iacocca negotiating $2 billion ($8,872,077,029 in 2025 dollars) worth loan guarantees from the United States Congress in highly publicized hearings that made him a recognized public figure. His efforts were successful and the Chrysler Loan Guarantee Act signed into law by President Jimmy Carter in 1979 saved the company from bankruptcy. French automaker Renault came to the rescue of AMC and purchased a majority share of the company in 1980. The American government subsequently began acting to protect the domestic automobile industry and in May 1981, President Ronald Reagan got the Japanese government to agree to a voluntary export restraint of 1.68 million vehicles a year to the United States.

With the restriction in place, the major Japanese automakers adjusted their business strategies. Instead of exporting large volumes of low-priced economy cars, they instead sought to use their limited allotment to export higher-priced vehicles while producing their lower-priced models in newly built factories within the United States. Increasing demand for more luxurious cars in Japan aided this adjustment and competition between the major automakers was fierce. The excess liquidity within the economy as a result of the 1985 Plaza Accord currency equalization efforts, followed by the Louvre Accord in 1987 that contributed to the Japanese asset price bubble gave them nearly endless amounts of capital to use to develop these new vehicles, which were growing increasingly exotic as the decade waned. For example, Jalopnik noted how the 1980 Datsun lineup was largely made up of basic economy cars and a compact pickup truck while the 1989 Nissan lineup included vehicles such as the Nissan 300ZX sports car, Nissan Maxima performance sedan, Nissan Cedric luxury sedan, Nissan Leopard personal luxury coupe, and the Nissan Pathfinder sport utility vehicle. Honda, Toyota and Nissan began developing luxury vehicles specifically for sale in the United States, believing there would significant growth in the luxury car market there as the American economy recovered from the early 1980s recession and the baby boomer generation grew older and more affluent. Honda launched the Acura brand in 1986, Toyota and Nissan followed by launching their respective Lexus and Infiniti brands in 1989.

=== Development ===
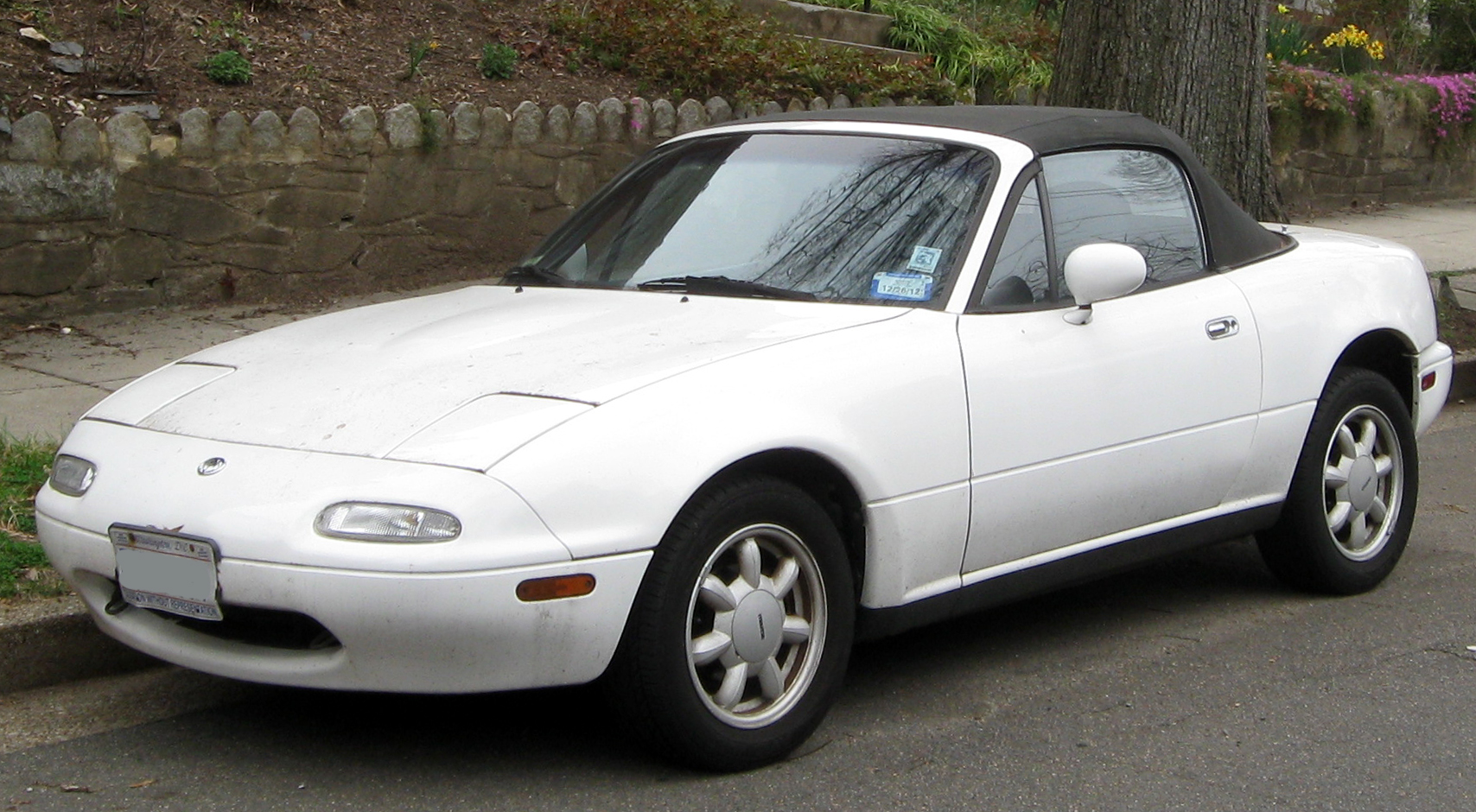
The surprise success of the Miata roadster in the United States made Mazda believe that it could build the necessary cachet to make a luxury division work.

Despite being of a much smaller size and having significantly less resources than Toyota and Nissan, Mazda embarked on an aggressive expansion and diversification plan in the late 1980s with the goal of eventually becoming Japan's third biggest automaker. Domestically, Mazda launched the Autozam, Eunos, and ɛ̃fini brands and created the M2 car customization division. Seeing their rivals entering the American luxury market, Mazda began "Project Pegasus" at Mazda North American Operations in Irvine, California headquarters during 1988 to study creating an American-tailored luxury car of their own. While Mazda was largely undistinguished in the American market at the time, the surprise success of the Mazda Miata roadster in America upon its spring 1989 launch emboldened the company, which planned to leverage it to build brand equity and attract new customers. Project Pegasus became the Amati division in 1989, with executive Dick Colliver put in charge. Shortly thereafter, Mazda acknowledged that it was studying building a luxury car to the Japanese press. Another clue that Mazda was eyeing the luxury market came when they showcased a 4.0 litre (3981cc), 3-bank, naturally aspirated W12 DOHC gasoline-powered engine that was limited to 276 bhp (206 kW; 280 PS) per the Japan auto industry's gentlemen's agreement at the 1989 Tokyo Motor Show. The W12 engine featured an aluminum engine block, Magnesium cylinder heads and oil pan, and fitted with ceramic valves and pistons (perhaps ceramic coated). Each cylinder bank had a displacement of 1327 cc, or three proposed Mazda series B3 engines mated together at the crankshaft. Though it is widely believed that this was the engine that was going to power the Amati 1000, former Mazda executive Bob Hall told Jalopnik in 2018 that the engine was just a mock up put out to misdirect the competition and was never a serious engineering study. Rumors that Mazda was planning a luxury division persisted throughout 1990, which the company vehemently denied. There was a significant gulf between how Mazda's Japanese and American operations handled the project; while the Japanese were pushing hard for it, completing development of the vehicles and tooling up a factory for production, the Americans were left to figure out how to make it work as a business. Many among Mazda's American staff did not take the project seriously, believing it was just busywork the Japanese created to put Colliver "out to pasture."

Mazda officially announced Amati at an August 1991 press conference to launch in spring 1994. The division was going to be headquartered at Mazda North American Operations in Irvine and unlike its rivals, Mazda planned to sell the vehicles within its existing dealerships. Mazda did not reveal any details about the cars themselves at the conference, opting to emulate Infiniti's early marketing strategies of keeping the cars under wraps to build anticipation among the public. Mazda claimed the name Amati came from the Latin expression "to love" and said it would invoke the thought of "the multicolored tapestry of a sunset...the delicate feel of fingertips on cashmere...the tartness of a ripe apple...the loving aroma of Thanksgiving turkey roasting in Grandma’s oven.” Analysts at the time noted that "Amati" was an anagram of "Miata" and wondered if the new vehicles would be inspired by the roadster. Reception to the announcement was mixed, with some industry analysts expressing skepticism that Mazda had the resources to support a separate luxury division and fears that the American luxury car market was becoming over saturated. Mazda's announcement of the Amati division came two weeks after two would-be competitors, Peugeot and Sterling, announced they were leaving the American market.

Contemporary media reports only spoke of two sedans being sold under the nameplate but retrospective reports speak of three or possibly four vehicles being launched under the Amati brand. The compact Amati 300 was going to be an American adaptation of the Eunos 500 sedan which began production at the Hofu plant in early 1992 and was released later that year for the Japanese and international markets. The mid-size Amati 500 was more ambitious, containing a supercharged miller cycle engine and Yaw controlled four-wheel steering. It went into production as the Eunos 800 at the Hofu plant later in 1992 and was released for sale in the Japanese and international markets in 1993. The brand's flagship was the enigmatic Amati 1000, which was never unveiled to the public nor were any specifications published, though the Australian car magazine Wheels published exterior and interior renderings of it in December 1992, two months after Amati was cancelled. Bob Hall described it as strongly resembling a 1991 Mazda 929, but with fatter pillars and a long, horizontal hood. It was slightly longer than the 929 and had more room in the back seat. According to Hall, the 1000 was going to be powered by a V12 created by combining two K V6 engines into a new 12 cylinder block while sharing the K engine's valvetrain. Hall told Jalopnik in 2018, "They had done a 3.6 of the two 1.8s. The block was designed up to a 5.0-liter. North America would be a 4.6 from two 2.3s.” According to Hall, running prototypes of the 1000 were made, which had 280 bhp (209 kW; 284 PS) and an exhaust note reminiscent of a Ferrari. Regarding its performance, Hall said that compared to the Lexus LS400, the Amati 1000 was slower going from 0-60 miles per hour (97 km/h) but was faster accelerating in passing maneuvers from 60 to 80 miles per hour (97 to 129 km/h). Early reports speculated that Mazda was developing a luxury coupe based on the Mazda Cosmo that would have competed against the Lexus SC400, but these were not substantiated and its possible those reporters were simply describing the significantly more luxurious Eunos Cosmo that launched for the Japanese market in 1990.

=== Cancellation ===
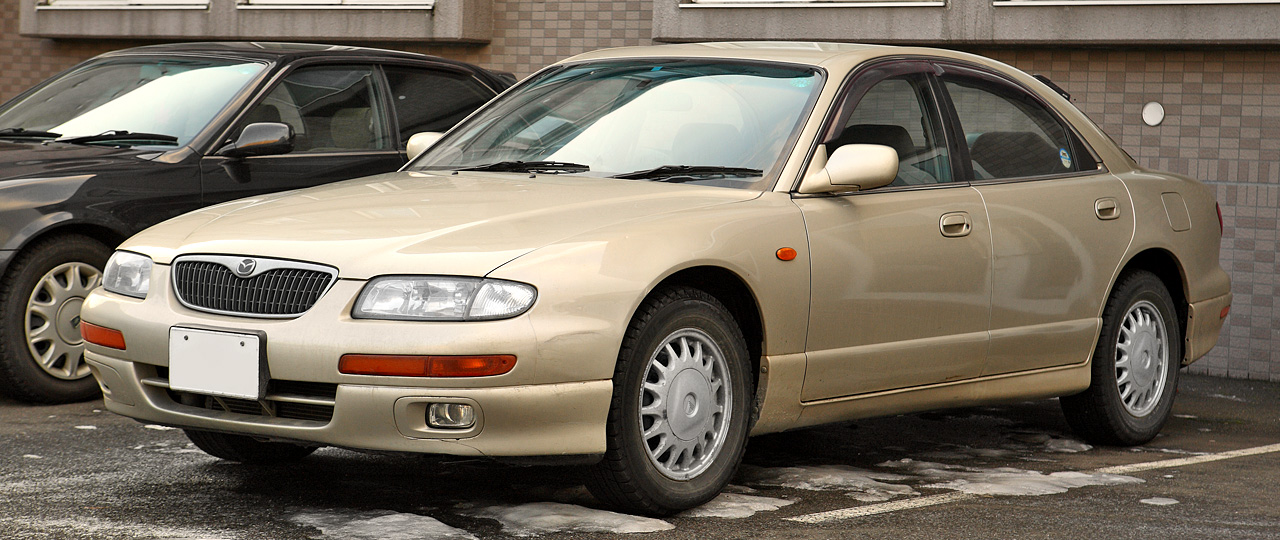
The Amati 500 is the only Amati vehicle to actually go on sale in the United States. When the Amati brand was cancelled in October 1992, it was already entering production for the Japanese and international market as the Eunos 800. It would go on sale in the United States in early 1994, where it was sold as the Mazda Millenia.

Shortly after the Amati brand was announced to the public in August 1991, the Japanese asset price bubble burst and by early 1992 the Japanese economy had collapsed into a lengthy period of deflation and stagnation that later became known as the Lost Decade. At the same time, the American economy entered into a less severe recession of its own in the aftermath of the Gulf War, significantly depressing luxury car sales and the car market in general. With the Japanese economy in freefall, credit markets tightened, car sales plunged and Mazda found itself with a shortage of liquidity. Mazda had overextended itself and found it could not support all of the new car lines it had launched in the years prior. Bob Hall recounted to Jalopnik how the then-new Mazda factory in Flat Rock, Michigan (which then built the Mazda MX-6, Mazda 626 and Ford Probe) had many quality issues which Mazda's Japanese management blamed on the incompetence of the plant's American labor force until the same issues started appearing in Mazda's Japanese plants as well. Mazda began devoting less and less money to the Amati project, which they had already invested at least 50 billion yen into, prompting Colliver to eventually tell the Japanese that they did not have enough money to launch the brand. The decision to cancel Amati was made when Mazda realized it did not have the $50 million needed ($114,714,252 in 2025 dollars) to put the Amati 1000 into production. With profits projected to be down by at least two thirds at the end of the fiscal year, Mazda announced on October 20, 1992 that the Amati brand had been cancelled. At the same time, they announced a major reduction in their investment in motor sports, ending the program that saw Mazda win the 24 Hours of LeMans with the 787B race car just the year before. At the time, two of the vehicles the Amati division planned to sell were already in production for the Japanese and international markets, running prototypes of the Amati 1000 were being tested, the Hofu plant was tooled up and ready to build the Amati V12 engine, 67 dealerships were signed up to sell the cars and Mazda had already budgeted $60 million to the California advertising firm Lord, Dentsu & Partners to create a marketing campaign for the brand. Marketing materials and brochures had already been prepared, small pieces of which have made their way to the public in the years since. Colliver laid off nearly all of the Amati program's staff, remarking that they had "researched their way out of a job". Colliver himself would retire from Mazda in 1994. The Ford Motor Company, which owned a 24% stake in Mazda, bought an additional 12% in 1995 to give Mazda an injection of fresh capital. Ford then dispatched executives over to Mazda to help them return to profitability. The Autozam, Eunos, and ɛ̃fini brands would all be discontinued before the end of the decade.

== Legacy ==
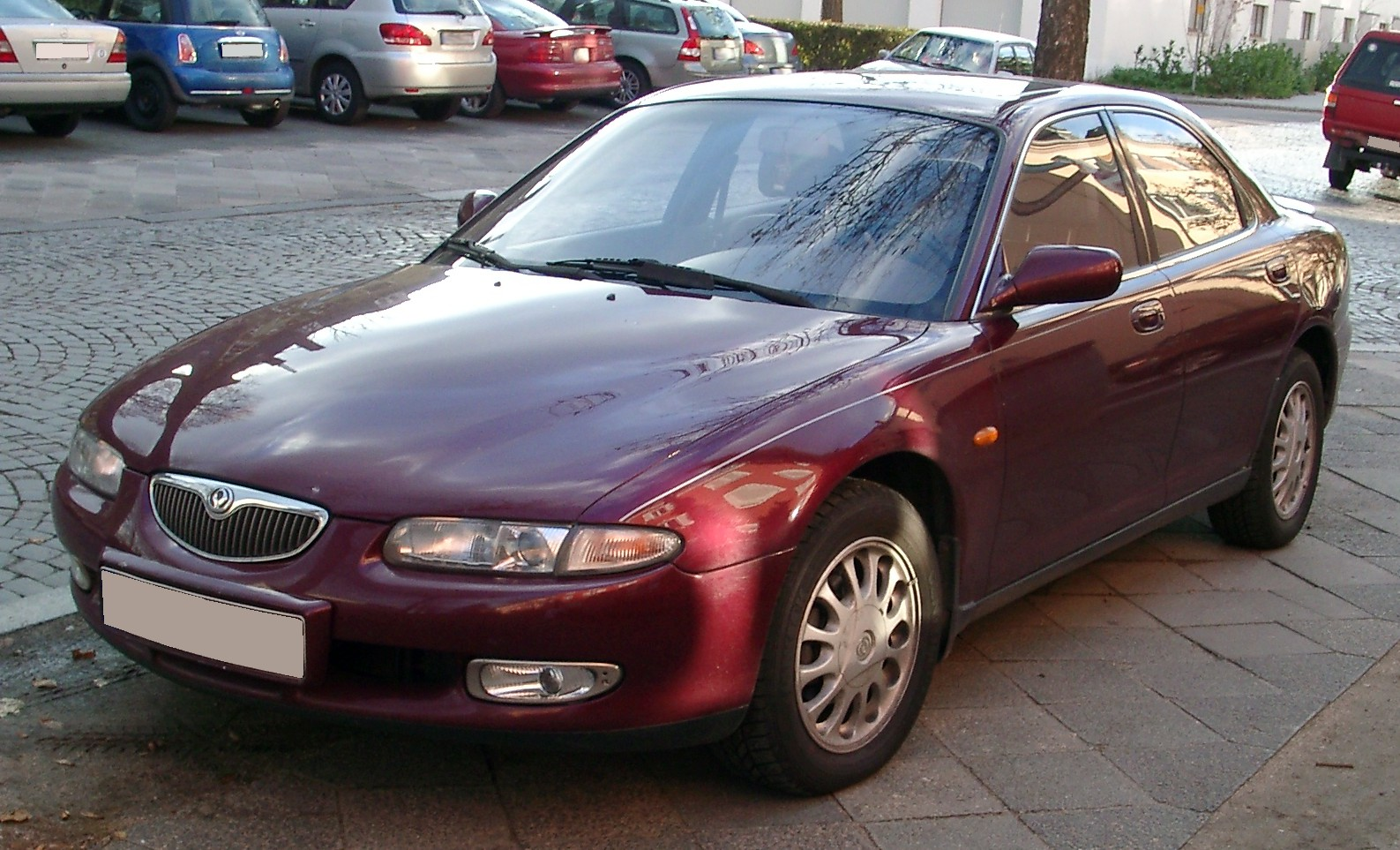
The Eunos 500 was originally planned to be sold in the United States as Amati's entry level model, and was sold in Europe as the Mazda Xedos6.

As Mazda never unveiled the actual Amati vehicles to the public, kept the project under tight wraps and did not preserve its remains, much of what has been cataloged about Amati by automotive journalists and historians is speculative and some details are disputed. What is known about Amati is based on what was written about it by contemporary automotive publications, testimony from Mazda employees involved in the project and study of the Amati cars that made it to production. Mazda has not acknowledged the Amati project since the October 1992 press conference announcing its cancellation and it is believed that Amati is an "open wound" that the company is ashamed of. Mazda's company-sanctioned museum in Hiroshima and their archive in California contain no artifacts or mention of the Amati project and when car blog Jalopnik created an in-depth retrospective of the brand in 2018, their American sources advised them against seeking information from Japanese sources because it was a "touchy subject" with them. In the finished piece, Jalopnik wrote of the brand, "There are only glimmers of brochures printed, but never distributed, scanned and hosted on old forum pages. A few spy shots and renderings made their way into a print magazine or two at the time, but without official confirmation from Mazda. Former employees confirmed to me that there’s still some footage of camouflaged prototypes testing kept in a private collection, but none has been made public. It still has some power in the cultural imagination, probably because imagination is all we have of it." Los Angeles Times reporter Gary O'Dell says Amati continues to be a major embarrassment to Mazda today, telling Jalopnik, "Face is big in the Japanese culture. It was a loss of face. To decide to do that, to make announcements, to tell the world you’d do it, and then not be able to... I think it would be an open wound to an American company." Motoring Research retroactively wrote of the brand, "Amati promised so much but delivered so little. Indeed, of all the Mazda brands, Amati is the one that appears to have vanished without a trace. It’s a tale of high hopes and great expectations, but one that ends in failure and huge losses."

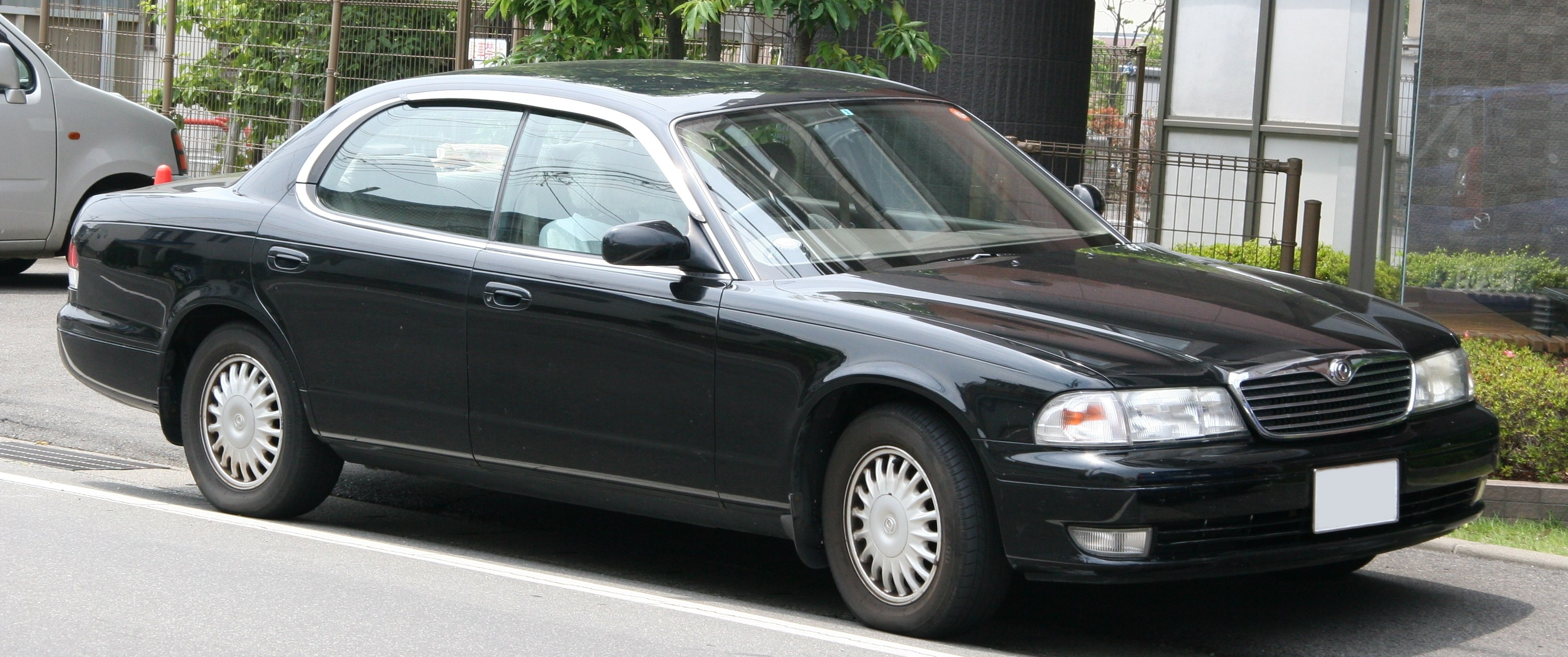
It is believed that the unfinished Amati 1000 was repurposed into the second generation Mazda Sentia that launched in 1995.

Jalopnik noted how all of Mazda's investment into Amati was "simply washed away". Colliver noted, “All the systems we developed, Mazda didn’t do anything with them. They basically threw them in the dumpster. But I kept them in mind. The image programs, the database programs, the dealer development programs. The people, the processes, I took them with me.” While plans to import the Eunos 500 were scrapped, the Eunos 800 still entered the American market as scheduled in early 1994, with certain features like the four-wheel steering removed, as the Mazda Millenia. It replaced the Mazda 929 as the brand's flagship on the American market after 1995. Reviewers at the time noted that the Millenia's level of quality, refinement and luxury went far beyond the rest of the Mazda line and could be compared to true luxury cars. Mazda ironically stated in the Millenia's advertisements, "We put the money into the car and not into a luxury division and all that overhead." The Amati 1000 was shelved without ever being unveiled to the public, though it is believed that the second generation Mazda Sentia that launched in 1995 is the Amati 1000 body repurposed with a Mazda J V6 and Sentia mechanical underpinnings. As the Hofu plant was already tooled to build the Amati V12 engine, Mazda looked for another way to use it. Mazda's American design studio drew up a V12 powered 2+2 that got to the stage of a full-size mock up before Ford cancelled it shortly after acquiring a controlling stake in Mazda in 1995. The V12 was then shelved, never to be seen by the public. Jalopnik noted how the proposed V12 concept strongly resembles the Mazda RX-8 sports car that went into production in 2003. Motoring Research retroactively said, "The Amati name may have died in 1992, but the ghost of the failed luxury brand lives on [in Mazda's 1990s products]".

It is debated whether Amati would have been successful had it launched. Industry analysts in 1991 were skeptical that Mazda had the resources to support a separate luxury division and the Chicago Tribune said in 1994 that the Amati venture "was foolhardy to begin with". Analysts at the time believed the American luxury car market was becoming over saturated and noted that Infiniti was struggling to distinguish itself. Mazda's announcement of the Amati division came two weeks after would-be competitors Peugeot and Sterling announced they were leaving the American market and four years later Italian luxury brand Alfa-Romeo also left the United States. Gary O'Dell believes that if Mazda would have gone ahead with the Amati launch, it would have bankrupted the company. O'Dell compared it to how fellow Japanese automaker Daihatsu collapsed during the 1992 economic downturn because it overextended itself with its brief, ill-fated attempt to enter the American market. Jalopnik believed that Mazda was punching well above its weight in the late 1980s, retroactively writing, "Once you get beyond its secrecy, catching drawings and rumored specs in bits and pieces, once you see the Amati for what it was, it is still such a shock that Mazda, little Mazda, was trying to pull it off." Many within Mazda's American operations had doubts about the program, believing that Mazda did not have brand equity or resources in the United States to launch and support a luxury brand. While Honda and Toyota had staked out reputations for quality and reliability that they could exploit to sell their luxury car lines (e.g. the promise of Toyota reliability in a luxury car could entice consumers to buy a Lexus despite its being a brand new brand with no attached history or prestige) Mazda was largely undistinguished. However, the surprise success of the Miata made them believe that Mazda could possibly pull it off. Dick Colliver believed the brand still could have launched had Mazda copied Lexus and only initially launched two models, adding additional vehicles gradually over time. However, all of the other Mazda executives that spoke to Jalopnik for its 2018 Amati retrospective dismissed the project as "foolish" and "doomed", saying that Mazda did not plan and invest enough and repeating the contemporary attitude that Mazda did not have the cachet to pull it off. Additionally, all of the four vehicles that would have been Amatis were generally unsuccessful on the market. The Eunos 500 and Mazda Millenia only earned a tepid response and were eventually discontinued with no successor, while the Eunos Cosmo and second-generation Sentia sold poorly and were withdrawn from the market after only a couple of years. On the other hand, Dick Colliver joined American Honda in 1994, bringing with him all of the planned systems and programs, as well as 7 colleagues, from the Amati program. He was placed in charge of the Acura division and under his management Acura saw a long period of sales growth and success through the late 1990s and 2000s.

Mazda began seeking to go upmarket and become a premium brand in the 2010s, renewing discussion of the Amati program amid questions of whether Mazda's new initiative would be successful. Just-Auto opined in 2017 that Mazda "needs" the Amati brand and should revisit the idea. In 2016, Colliver hosted a 25th anniversary reunion for him and 50 other Mazda employees who worked on the program. They brought pieces of Amati branded merchandise they had rescued and Colliver teared up at the event, describing the day Mazda canceled the program as the saddest day of his life. Jalopnik published a lengthy, in-depth retrospective of the Amati program in 2018 with writer Raphael Orlove commenting, "I wanted to show that Amati seemed like such a smart move at the time, only to be undone by an economic crash outside Mazda’s control. But I didn’t expect to hear so many of those who worked on Amati to denounce it, to say it was foolish, or doomed."

== Notes ==
- The first mention of the Amati luxury brand was in Motor Trend magazine February 1992 page 118, the article written by Maryann N. Keller. In the June 1992 issue, the Amati logo was displayed in green, and they mentioned that the advertising campaign was to be handled by Los Angeles based Lord, Dentsu & Partners who had an advertising campaign budget of $75 million, with a launch to be slated at the end of 1993. The November 1993 issue on page 18 stated that after Amati had been cancelled due to recession, the Millenia was originally to be sold as an Amati.
