= C. Mark Jordan =

American automobile designer

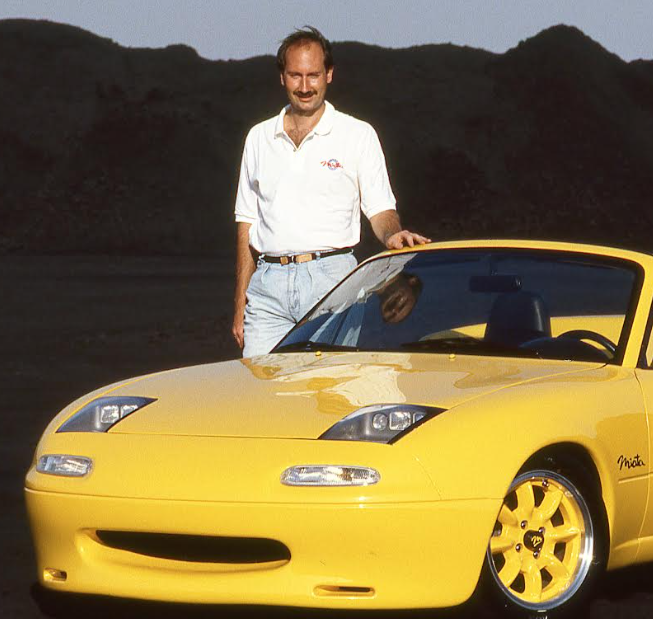
- Designer Mark Jordan with Miata Club Racer
- Occupation: Automotive Designer
- Employer: Mazda North American Operations
- Known for: Design of the first generation Mazda MX-5 Miata
- Father: Chuck Jordan

Charles Mark Jordan is an automotive designer known for his work with General Motors's Opel division and Mazda North America, including his part in the genesis of the first generation Mazda MX-5 Miata, a car that ultimately became the best-selling two-seat convertible sports car in history.

== Background and career ==
The son of noted former GM vice president of design, Chuck Jordan, Jordan studied at Western Michigan University before attending Art Center College of Design (1974-1978).

He subsequently worked for Adam Opel AG (1978-1982) for four years, working on concept vehicles, as well as the sedan variant of the Opel Omega. He later worked with Mazda North American Operations in various roles (1982-2009).

Jordan is widely known for collaborating on the design of the first generation (1989) Mazda MX-5 Miata, with Bob Hall, Masao Yagi,Tom Matano, and Norman Garrett . Hall hired Jordan in early 1983 to join the newly formed Mazda design studio in Southern California, where they collaborated on the parameters of the initial image, proportion and visualization of what would become Miata, a "light-weight sports concept".

Jordan attended Birmingham Groves High School with his friend, Jeff Teague (1956-2016, son of the noted designer Dick Teague, 1923–1991). The two formed a design company JTDNA, before Jordan founded his own firm, CMJ Design Consulting.

He directs and manages the Charles M. Jordan Scholarship Fund, an endowment fund in honor of his late father, with the College for Creative Studies in Detroit.
