= Tom Matano =

Japanese automotive designer (1947–2025)

- 俣野 努
- Born: Tsutomu Matano; October 7, 1947; Nagasaki, Japan
- Died: September 20, 2025 (aged 77)
- Occupation: Mazda's chief designer
- Employer(s): Mazda North American Operations, Mazda Motor Corporation Japan
- Known for: Design and R&D of the Mazda MX-5 Miata (NA/NB) and Mazda RX-7 (FD)

Tsutomu "Tom" Matano (Japanese: 俣野 努, Matano Tsutomu; October 7, 1947 – September 20, 2025) was a Japanese advertising agent, automotive designer and automotive journalist. Matano was born in Nagasaki, Japan, and continued to live in Japan until after his studies in university. He began an Analysis Engineering Major at Seikei University in Tokyo, Japan, in April 1965 and graduated in March 1969. Following his graduation, Matano moved to the United States in September 1970 via his uncle's container ship, landing himself in Seattle, then to Los Angeles, and finally New York City.

Once in America, he continued his education with a semester of language school, ditching plans to transfer to Environmental Design, and graduated in 1974 for a job in Detroit with General Motors. Consequently, due to Matano's work visa and the rising oil crisis, GM moved him to Australia to work for Holden Design alongside Phillip Zmood, mostly working on the GM Holden Torana, departing in 1977 for Germany and BMW in Munich, Germany.

In 1983, Matano joined Mazda as Chief Designer for Mazda North American Operations, then moved up to become the Vice President of Design and eventually the Executive Vice President of Western Operations for Mazda R&D North America, Inc., as well as the Executive Designer and Director of Mazda North American Operations. In his career with Mazda, his notable designs stand out in many vehicles, such as the Mazda RX-7, Mazda MX-5, the Miata "M-Coupe" concept car, and numerous other projects with his large group of design teams he created.

Matano worked as a journalist for the Western Automotive Journalists.

He also made an appearance in Gran Turismo 7.

Matano died on September 20, 2025, at the age of 77.

== Career timeline ==
- Before 1983 – numerous design positions within BMW, Volvo and GM
- 1983–1999 – executive vice-president, Mazda Research and Development of Mazda North American Operations
- 1999–2002 – executive designer for Mazda
- 2002–2025 – executive director, School of Industrial Design, Academy of Art University, San Francisco
- 2008–2025 – vice-president of design, Next Autoworks (previously V-Vehicle)
- 2025 – Journalist for Western Automotive Journalists

== Automotive designs ==
Tom's work with Mazda to sketch the first generation Mazda MX-5 Miata.

=== Mazda MX-5 Miata ===
Part of Matano's history with Mazda in the years 1983–2002 was spent on the design of the Mazda MX-5 Miata with fellow designer C. Mark Jordan.

== See also ==
- Mazda MX-5
- Mazda RX-7
- C. Mark Jordan
