= Jeff Teague (automotive designer) =

- Jeffrey William Teague
- Born: October 3, 1956; Franklin, Michigan, U.S.
- Died: July 29, 2016 (aged 59); Agoura Hills, California, U.S.
- Occupation: Automotive designer

Jeffrey William Teague (October 3, 1956 – July 29, 2016) was an American automotive designer and design consultant for Volkswagen, Ford Motor Company, Mitsubishi Motors, Hyundai Motor Group and Kia Motors — and known widely for his role as principal designer of the 1983-1992 Lincoln Mark VII.

Teague founded the Transportation Design Department at the Academy of Art University (formerly Academy of Art College) in San Francisco. His father was noted industrial and automotive designer, Dick Teague.

== Background ==
Teague was born in Franklin, Michigan, to Marian Rose Teague (born 1927) and Richard A. Teague (1923–1991). His father was a noted industrial and automotive designer whose work as Styling Director and Vice President of Design of American Motors Corporation included the AMC Gremlin, AMX, Hornet and Pacer, as well as the Jeep Cherokee (XJ).

Teague grew up in Franklin, Michigan and graduated from Birmingham Groves High School in nearby Birmingham, Michigan, in 1975. He graduated from the Art Center College of Design in Pasadena California in 1978.

== Career and design work ==
Teague became a designer with Ford in Dearborn Michigan, a senior designer with Mitsubishi Motors North America in Cypress California, Chief Designer Volkswagen AG of Germany in Wolfsburg, Germany, and Studio Chief for Volkswagen of America He was subsequently the senior designer at Mitsubishi Motors of America in Simi Valley California, and later was design consultant with Hyundai and Kia.

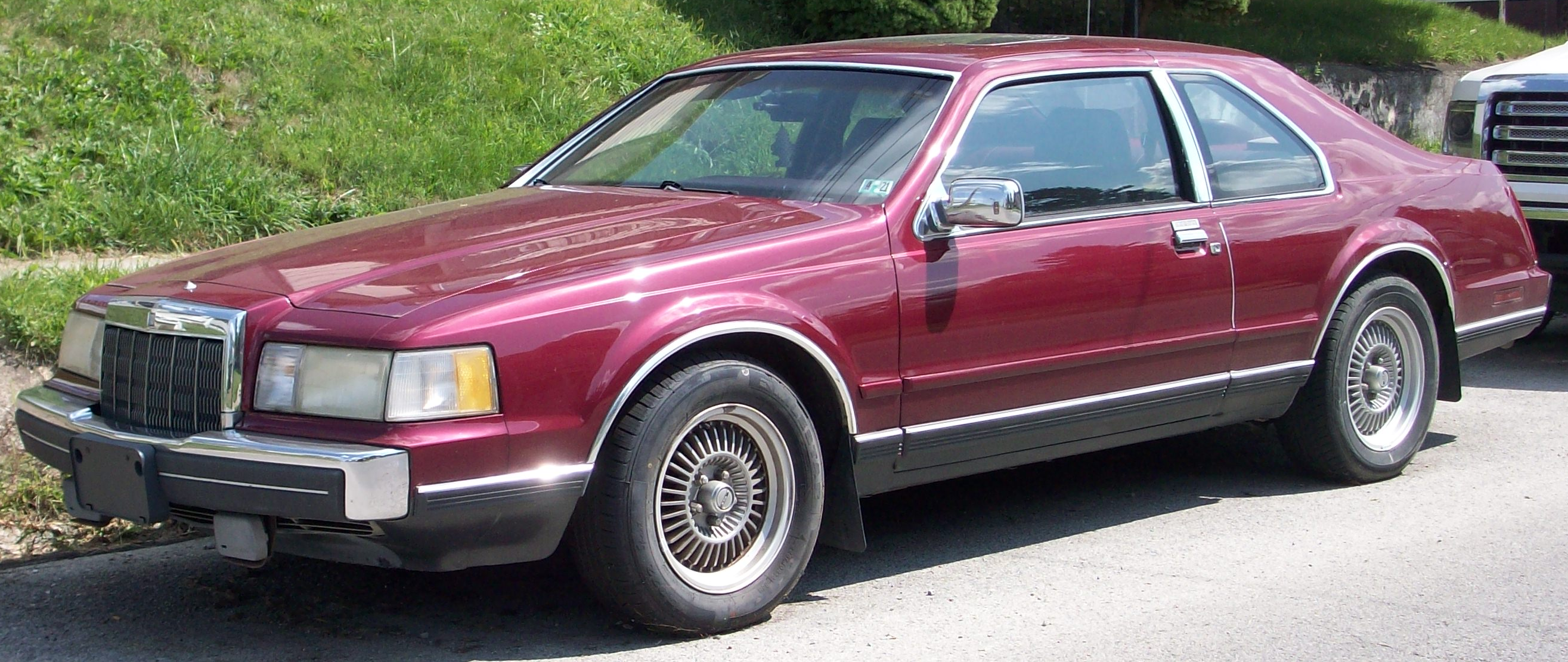
1986-1992 Lincoln Mark VII

At Ford Motor Company, Teague worked under Jack Telnack on designs for the ninth generation Ford Thunderbird (1982-1987), the seventh generation Lincoln Continental (1982–1987) and the wagon variants of the first generation Ford Taurus and Mercury Sable He was the principal designer for the Lincoln Mark VII (1983-1992).

In 1998, Teague started the design program in Automotive and Industrial design at the Academy of Art University (formerly Academy of Art College) in San Francisco. Teague hired and managed the program staff and developed the curriculum and syllabus, later serving on the Board of Directors until his death in 2016.

Teague provided design services and consulting services to Hyundai, Kia, Subaru, and others, found his firm, Teague Design in 1998. He worked with his high school friend, C. Mark Jordan (son of GM designer Chuck Jordan, to form a design company JTDNA.

He designed an updated AMX 4 based on AMC's mid-engine sports car that contributed to his father's design reputation.

In 2006, Teague provided design services for the revival Duesenberg line of automobiles, designing the CEM axial powered Duesenberg Torpedo Coupe. The vehicle was never produced. He was Chief Design Director for the Baldwin, Wisconsin based company and the car was expected to be introduced in 2013. In 2012, the company bought a building in Baldwin to produce its replica cars on a modern Ford chassis, as well as a motorized tricycle.

== Death ==
Jeff Teague died on July 29, 2016, at his home in Agoura Hills, California, at age 59. He was survived by his mother, Marian Rose Teague (born 1927); wife Glenda Gilkey Teague and three children; Rachel Marian, Thea Nicole (Nikki) and Author Jeffrey Harrison Teague (AJ).
