= M2 (Mazda) =

Former Japanese automobile manufacturer

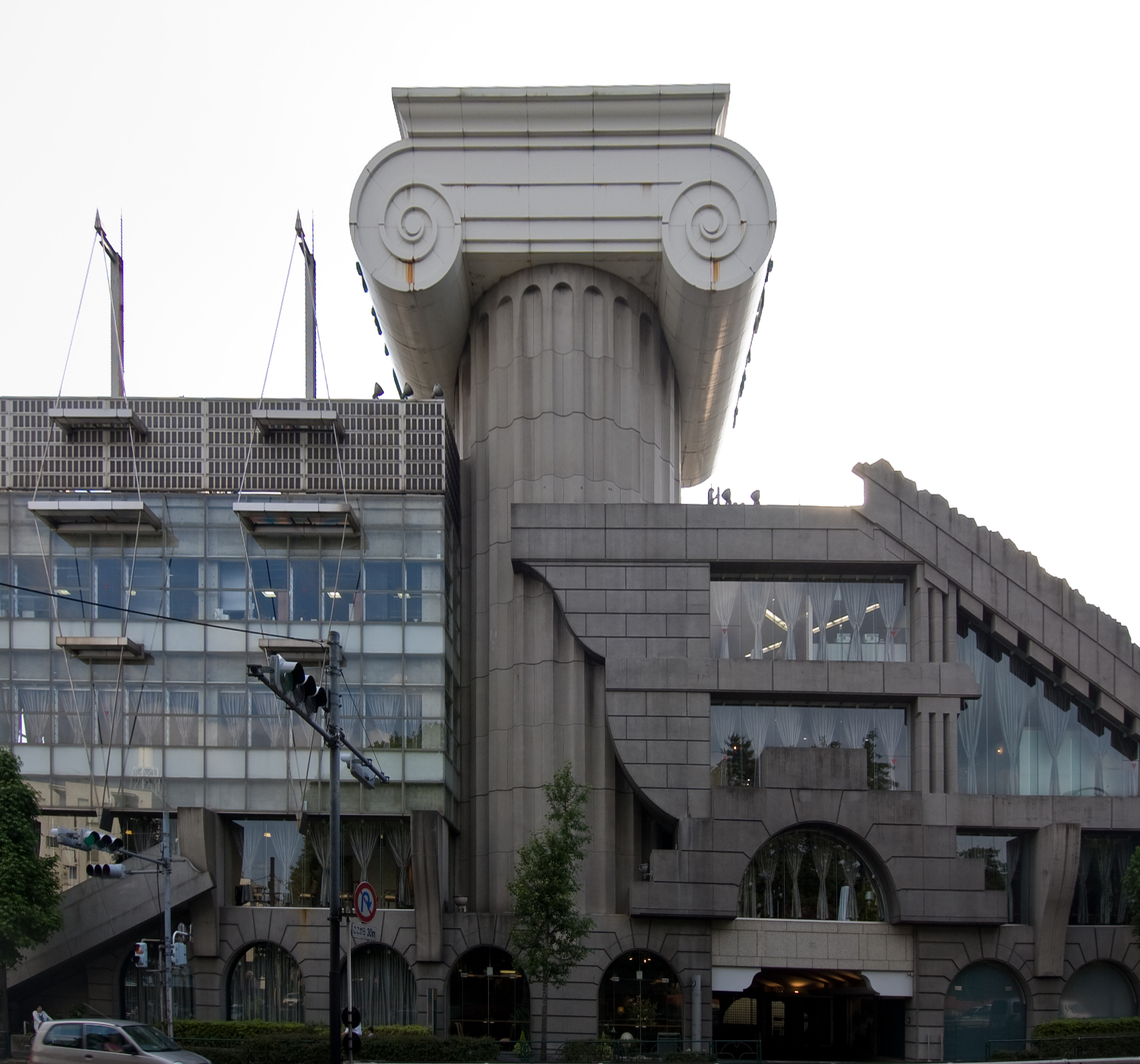
- The M2 Building
- Company type: Division
- Industry: Automotive
- Founded: 1991
- Defunct: 1995
- Fate: Defunct
- Headquarters: Tokyo, Japan
- Area served: Japan
- Products: Automobiles
- Parent: Mazda

M2 (エムツー, Emu Tsū) was an automobile manufacturer and subsidiary of the Mazda Motor Corporation. The company existed from 1991 to 1995 and was also known under its nickname Mazda Two. M2 was responsible for the development and the production of vehicle parts, such as bodykits. The headquarters was inside the M2 Building in Tokyo, Japan. The showrooms of complete vehicles was inside the affiliated Setagaya Matsudarotari (Mazda Rotary) Building. The company was closed in 1995, having been a victim of the asset price bubble's collapse which began in 1990 and led to Japan's Lost Decades.

The vehicles of the brand, all modified Mazda products, were made only in small numbers, making them a high priority for collectors. Most known M2 vehicles are currently registered in Japan although some have made it overseas to the USA.

== Model overview ==
Model	Description	Status	Year
M2 1001 "Cafe Racer" / "Clubman"	Sport-tuned version of Eunos Roadster	300 units built	1991-1992
M2 1002 "Vintage"	Comfort-focused version of Eunos Roadster	40 units built	1992
M2 1003 "Junior"	Lightweight, hardcore version of Eunos Roadster	Cancelled over weak M2 1002 sales, prototype converted into M2 1008	
M2 1004 "Fullhouse"	High-roof van version of Autozam Revue	Concept	1991
M2 1005 "WRC" / Mazda Familia Sport-4	Group A rally version of Mazda Familia	Concept, evolved into M2 1023	1989
M2 1006 "Cobra"	High-power version of Eunos Roadster with JE-ZE V6	Cancelled due to large amount of modifications required, 2 prototypes built	1992
M2 1007	4 door sports car	Cancelled	
M2 1008 "Berlinetta"	Coupe based on Eunos Roadster	Cancelled, replica later built	1994
M2 1009	Small SUV	Concept	1991
M2 1010	Coupé utility based on Mazda Familia	Concept	
M2 1011	Luxury version of Eunos Cosmo	Concept	
M2 1012 "Clubhouse"	Luxury version of ɛ̃fini MPV	Concept	1991
M2 1013			
M2 1014	Off-road version of Autozam AZ-1	Concept	1993
M2 1015	Autozam AZ-1 with styling upgrades	50 units built	1994
M2 1015A	Rally-inspired version of Autozam AZ-1	Concept	1994
M2 1015B	Autozam AZ-1 with detachable plastic roof panels	Concept	1994
M2 1016			
M2 1017			
M2 1018			
M2 1019 "S. Presso"	Sport-tuned version of Eunos Presso with KL-ZE V6	Cancelled	
M2 1020	Sport-tuned version of ɛ̃fini RX-7	Cancelled, 2 prototypes built, would inspire Mazda RX-7 SP	1995 (planned)
M2 1021			
M2 1022	5 door hatchback, originally a large MPV	Evolved into and entered production as the Mazda Demio	
M2 1023 / Mazda Familia Sport-4	Production version of M2 1005	Concept	1989
M2 1024	Camper version of Mazda Bongo Friendee	Entered production as the Mazda Bongo Friendee Auto Free Top	
M2 1025			
M2 1026			
M2 1027			
M2 1028 "Street Competition"	Track-focused version of Eunos Roadster	300 units built	1994
M2 1029			
M2 1030			
M2 1031	Wheelchair adapted Eunos Roadster	Concept	
