= Mazda MX-5 (NA) =

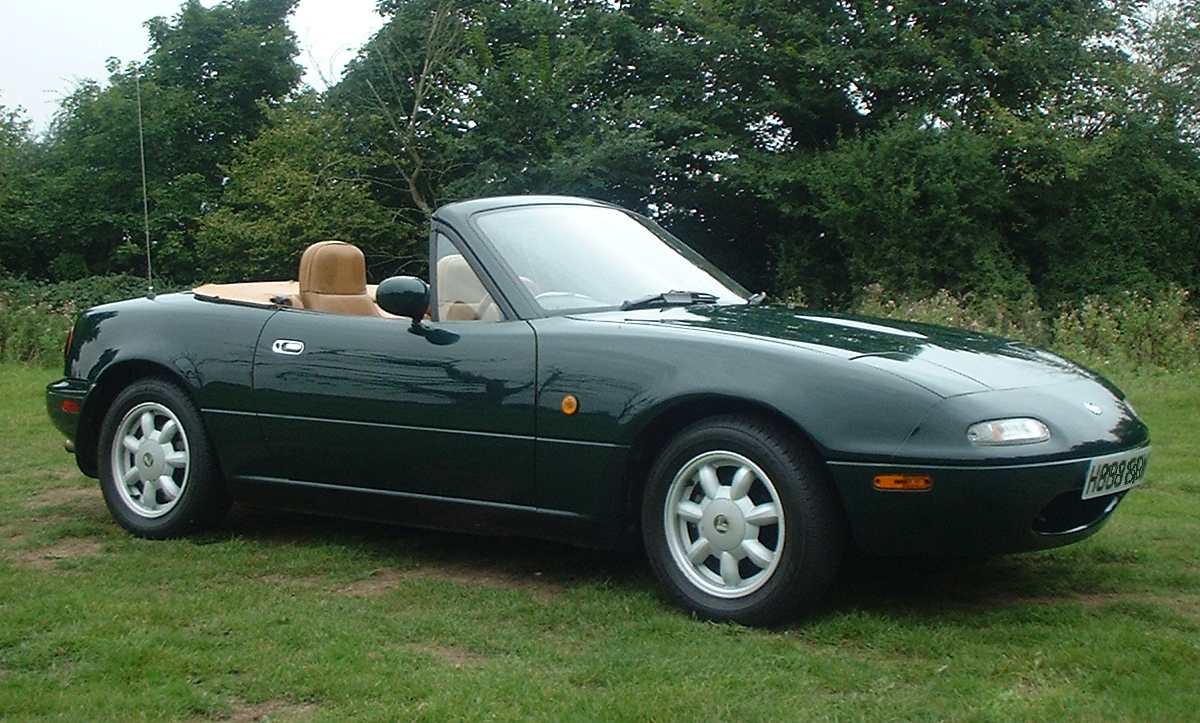
- 1990 Eunos Roadster V-spec (Japan)

Overview
- Manufacturer: Mazda
- Model code: NA
- Also called: Eunos Roadster (Japan); Mazda Miata (North America); Mazda MX-5 Miata (North America)
- Production: April 1989–1997 (431,506 units produced)
- Assembly: Japan: Hiroshima (Ujina Plant No. 1)
- Designer: Tom Matano; Shunji Tanaka (1987)

Body and chassis
- Class: Roadster, sports car (S)
- Body style: 2-door convertible
- Layout: Front-engine, rear-wheel-drive layout

Powertrain
- Engine: 1,597 cc B6ZE(RS) DOHC I4; 1,597 cc B6ZE(RS) DOHC supercharged I4 (Mazdaspeed B-Spec); 1,839 cc BP DOHC I4; 1,995 cc BP DOHC I4 (Mazdaspeed C-Spec)
- Transmission: 5-speed M526 manual; 4-speed Mazda Jatco N4AHL (Nissan 4N71B) automatic; 4-speed Mazda Jatco N4AEL (Nissan 4N71B) automatic

Dimensions
- Wheelbase: 2,265 mm (89.2 in)
- Length: 3,950 mm (155.5 in)
- Width: 1,675 mm (65.9 in)
- Height: 1,230 mm (48.4 in)
- Curb weight: 1,002 kg (2,210 lb)

Chronology
- Successor: Mazda MX-5 (NB)

The Mazda MX-5 (NA) (sold in Japan as the Eunos Roadster (ユーノス・ロードスター, Yūnosu Rōdosutā) and in North America as the Mazda MX-5 Miata) is the first generation of the Mazda MX-5, manufactured from 1989 to 1997. Inspired by the post-war era British sports cars, the MX-5 rejuvenated interest in roadsters after the demise of cars such as the MG B, Triumph Spitfire, and Fiat 124 Spider.

Since its debut, the MX-5 has won numerous automotive awards and has become the world's best selling sports car.

== Overview ==
The MX-5 was unveiled at the Chicago Auto Show on February 10, 1989, with a price tag of US$14,000 (equivalent to $36,362 in 2025). The MX-5, with production code NA, was made available for delivery to buyers worldwide in the following dates: May 1989 (as a 1990 model) in the US and Canada; September 1, 1989 in Japan; and 1990 in Europe. An optional hardtop was made available at the same time, in sheet moulding compound (SMC). Demand initially outstripped production, fueled by enthusiastic press reviews.

In Japan, the car was not badged as a Mazda, as the company was in the process of launching different marques for deluxe models, similar to Nissan's Infiniti, Honda's Acura and Toyota's Lexus. Instead, the Mazda MX-5 was sold as the Eunos Roadster, and was joined by the MX-3/AZ-3/Eunos Presso (based on Japanese Mazda dealerships). The exterior dimensions and the engine displacement were also in compliance with Japanese Government compact car regulation.

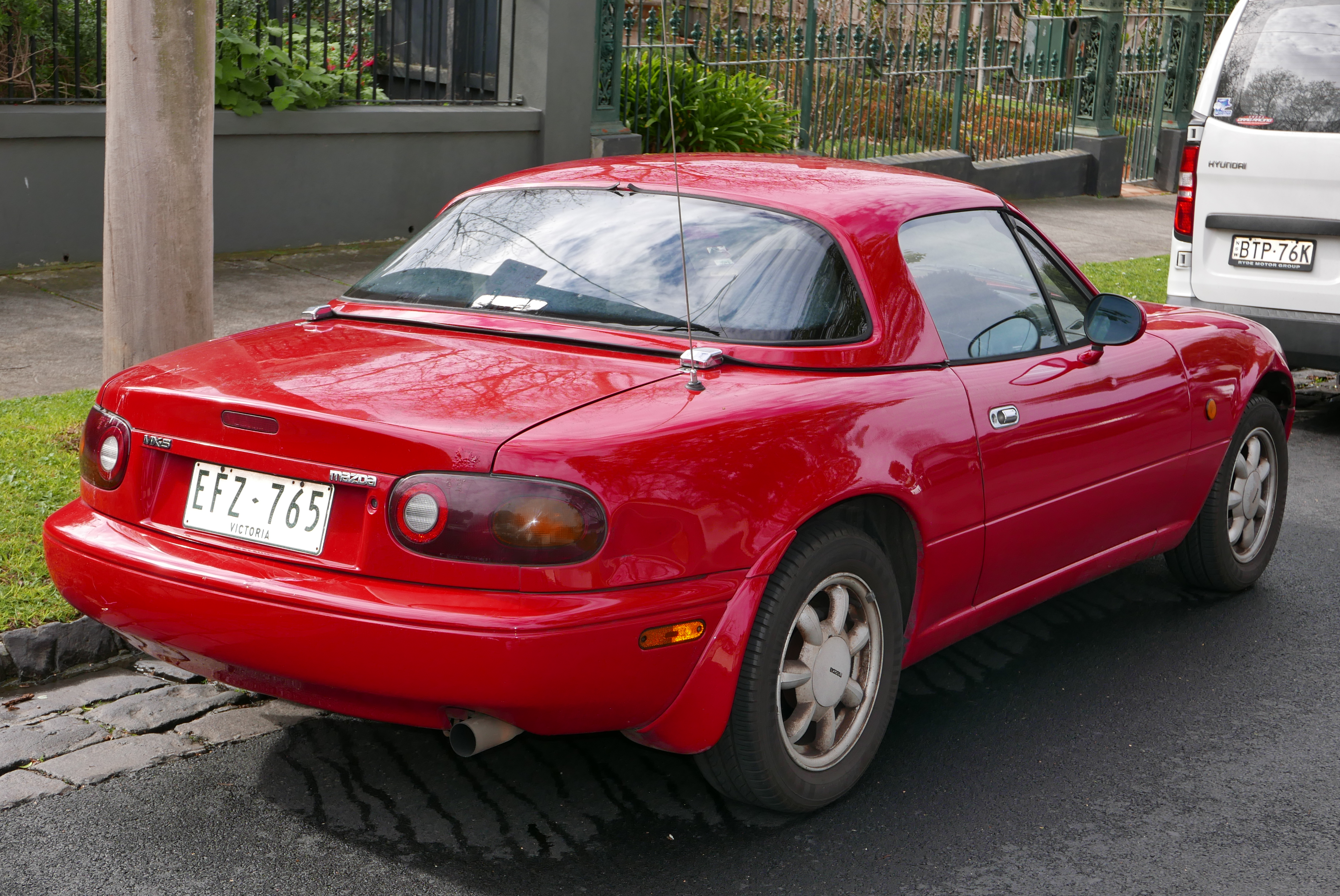
Mazda MX-5 with hardtop (Australia)

The NA has a steel unibody with an aluminium hood. Overall dimensions are 3,970 mm (156 in) in length, 1,675 mm (65.9 in) in width, and 1,235 mm (48.6 in) in height. Without options, the NA weighs 980 kg (2,160 lb). It has a drag coefficient of Cd=0.38. Suspension is independent by double wishbones on all four wheels, with anti-roll bars front and rear. Brakes are four-wheel disc, ventilated at the front, and wheels alloy, fitted with 185/60HR14 radial tires. The base model came with stamped steel wheels from the then-current 323/Protege.

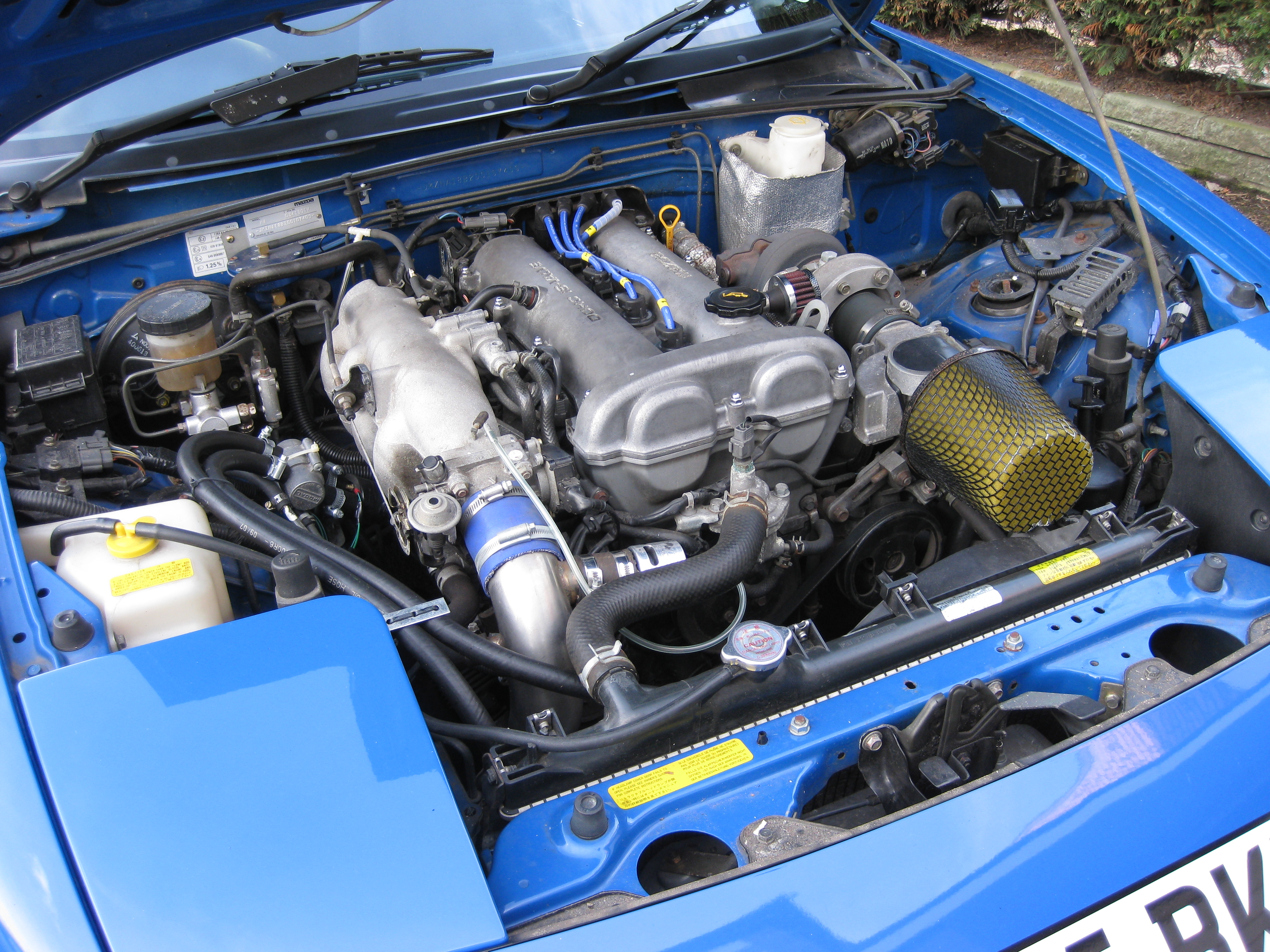
1990 Mazda MX-5 1600cc DOHC 4-cylinder engine. This example has been modified with the addition of a GReddy TD04 (Mitsubishi) turbocharger kit.

The original MX-5, with standard manual transmission, came with a 1.6 L (98 cu in) DOHC inline four-cylinder engine, producing 86 kW (115 bhp) at 6,500 rpm, and 136 N⋅m (100 lbf⋅ft) of torque at 5,500 rpm. The engine employs an electronic fuel injection system using a vane-type air flow meter and an electronic ignition system with a camshaft angle sensor instead of a distributor. This engine, codenamed B6ZE(RS), was specifically designed for the MX-5 and featured a lightened crankshaft, flywheel, and aluminium sump with cooling fins. An MX-5 with the optional automatic transmission had its 1.6L engine tuned to develop peak torque at lower rpm's (4000 rpm instead of 5500) to better mate with the automatic transmission gearing and torque requirements. This tuning resulted in a lower peak power of 78.5 kW (105 bhp) at 6500 rpm.

The standard 5-speed manual transmission derived from that used in the also rear-wheel drive Mazda 929/Luce. The gear-shift was the subject of close attention during development, resulting in as small a gear pattern as possible and with minimal gear-changing effort. In the American and Japanese markets, a 4-speed automatic transmission was also offered, as well as an optional viscous limited-slip differential on manual transmission cars. To achieve a low introductory price and low weight, the entry model was kept basic. It had steel wheels, no power brakes, steering, or windows, and no stereo or air conditioning. Depending on the market, these were added as standard equipment in later years.

Mazda reported that the 1990 NA would reach 0-60 mph (97 km/h) in 8.6 seconds, with a top speed of 116.8 mph (188.0 km/h). Japanese market Eunos models were limited to 180 km/h (110 mph). Car and Driver tested the NA for their September 1989 issue, achieving a 0-60 mph (97 km/h) time of 9.2 seconds and a top speed of 116 mph (187 km/h), with hardtop installed. Motor Trend's July 1989 test gave a 0-60 mph (97 km/h) time of 8.9 seconds. The NA with an automatic transmission reached 97 km/h (60 mph) in 9.9 seconds and had a top speed of 181 km/h (112 mph).

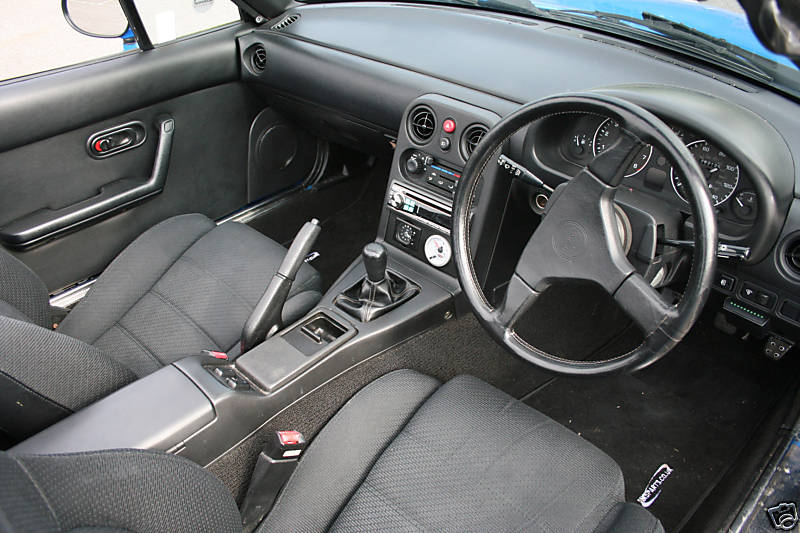
Interior

In 1993, 1,500 LE (Limited Edition) cars were produced. This model featured red leather interior, upgraded stereo, Nardi shift knob, Nardi steering wheel, cruise control, limited-slip differential, power windows, power mirrors, power steering, air conditioning, BBS wheels, Bilstein shocks, front and rear spoilers, ABS brakes, stainless sill plates, and Harley style peanut tank door speaker trim. All 1993 LE cars came in black.

For the 1994 model year, the first-generation MX-5 was freshened with the introduction of the more powerful 1,839 cc (1.8 L; 112.2 cu in) BP-ZE engine, dual airbags placed in a redesigned dashboard, the addition of a Mazda badge on the front fascia in the US and a Torsen limited-slip differential in some markets. The chassis was substantially braced to meet new side-impact standards, most visibly by adding a "track bar" between the seatbelt towers inside the car, but also to the front and rear subframes. 1994 also saw the introduction of the "R" package, a sport-themed package with Bilstein shocks, stiffer sway bars, retuned springs, subtle front and rear underbody spoilers, and a Torsen LSD. Air conditioning was optional, but the "R" package was not available with power steering, leather, or an automatic transmission. It can also be identified by a red Miata badge on the rear instead of the usual black. No body style changes were made, however.

The new 1,839 cc (1.8 L; 112.2 cu in) engine produced 96 kW (129 bhp) at 6,500 rpm and 149 N⋅m (110 lbf⋅ft) of torque at 5,500 rpm, which was then increased to 99 kW (133 bhp) at 6,500 rpm and 155 N⋅m (114 lbf⋅ft) of torque at 5,500 rpm for the 1996 model year. The base weight increased to 990 kg (2,180 lb). Performance was thus improved slightly, because the additional weight was more than offset by the extra power. In some markets such as Europe, the 1.6 L (98 cu in) engine continued to be available as a lower-cost option, but was detuned to 66 kW (89 bhp). This lower-powered model did not receive all the additional chassis bracing of the new 1.8 L (110 cu in). Japanese and U.S. models offered an optional Torsen LSD, which was far more durable than the previous viscous differential.

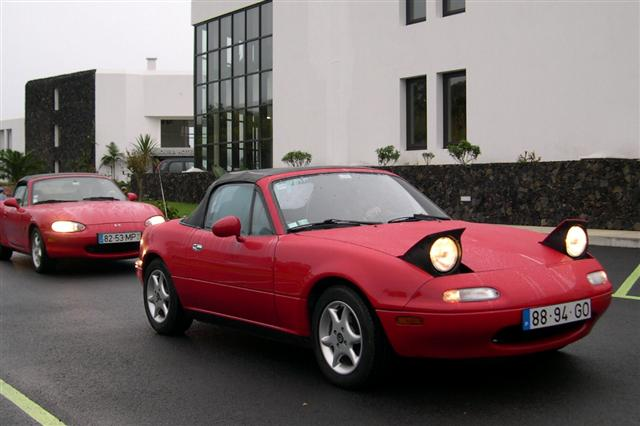
The retractable headlamps of the NA (front car) were replaced by fixed headlamps on the NB (rear car).

There were a number of trim levels and special editions available, determined by local Mazda marketing departments. In the US, the base model was offered for US$13,995 at launch and was very basic, with manual windows, steel wheels, and without air conditioning or power steering. The "A Package" offered power steering, a leather-wrapped steering wheel, aluminum alloy wheels and cassette stereo. The "B Package" added power windows, along with cruise control and headrest speakers, while the "C Package" included a tan interior and top with leather seats. The "R Package" was for racing, and the annual special editions were formalized as "M Editions". These included all of the luxury options from the "C Package" as well as special paint and, sometimes, special wheels. In the UK, to celebrate Mazda's 24 hours of Le Mans win, Mazda brought out a special edition of the MX-5, with the winner's color scheme (see Mazda 787B) and came equipped with BBR (Brodie Brittain Racing) turbo conversion; the car is one of the most sought after special edition cars of the MX-5s.

The first generation MX-5 was phased out after the 1997 model year (with the exception of 400 limited edition Berkeley models sold only in the UK in 1998 to mark the end of the NA), with the final 1,500 NAs produced for the US market being the "STO" ("Special Touring Option") versions.

== Special editions ==
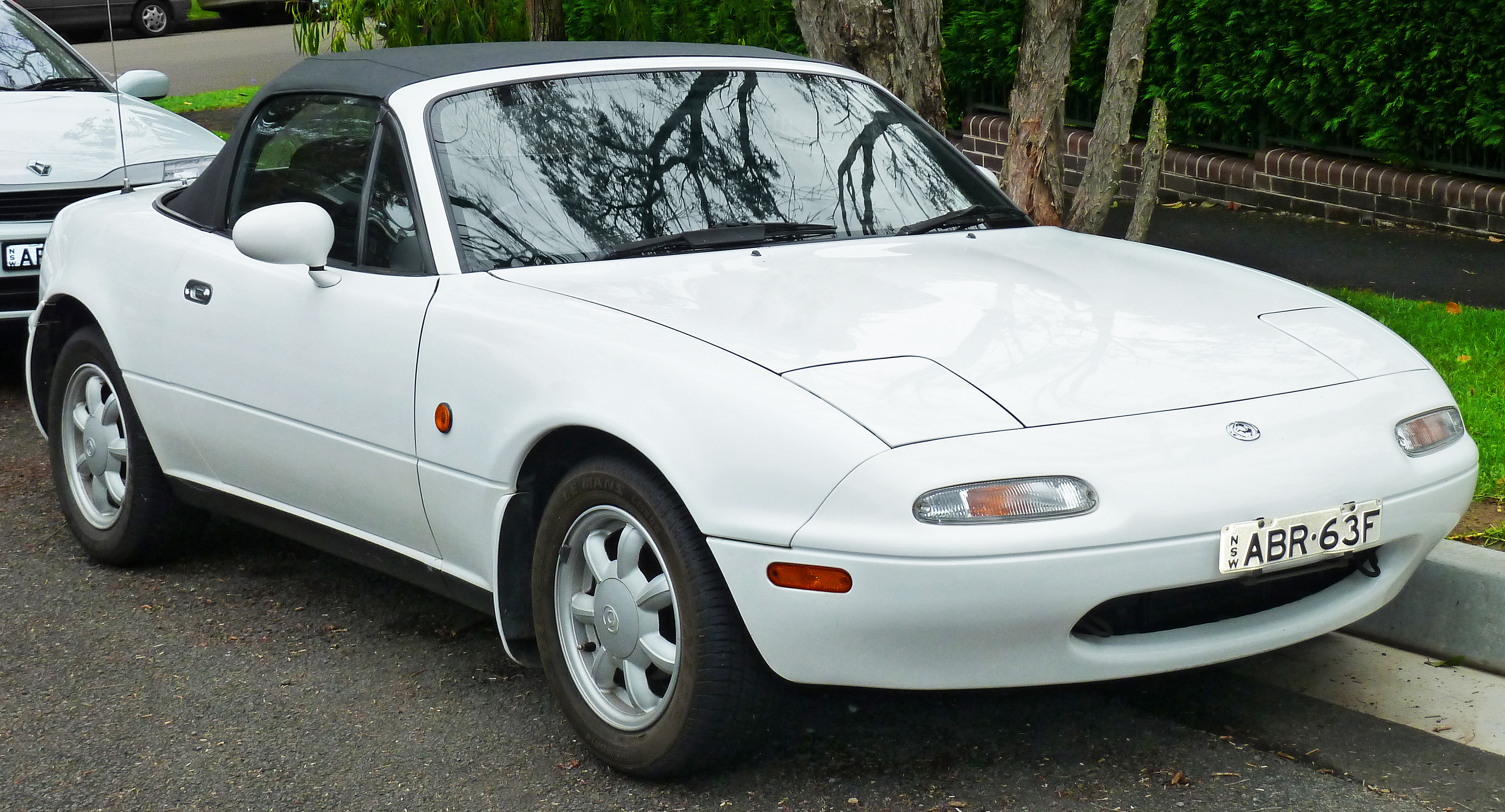

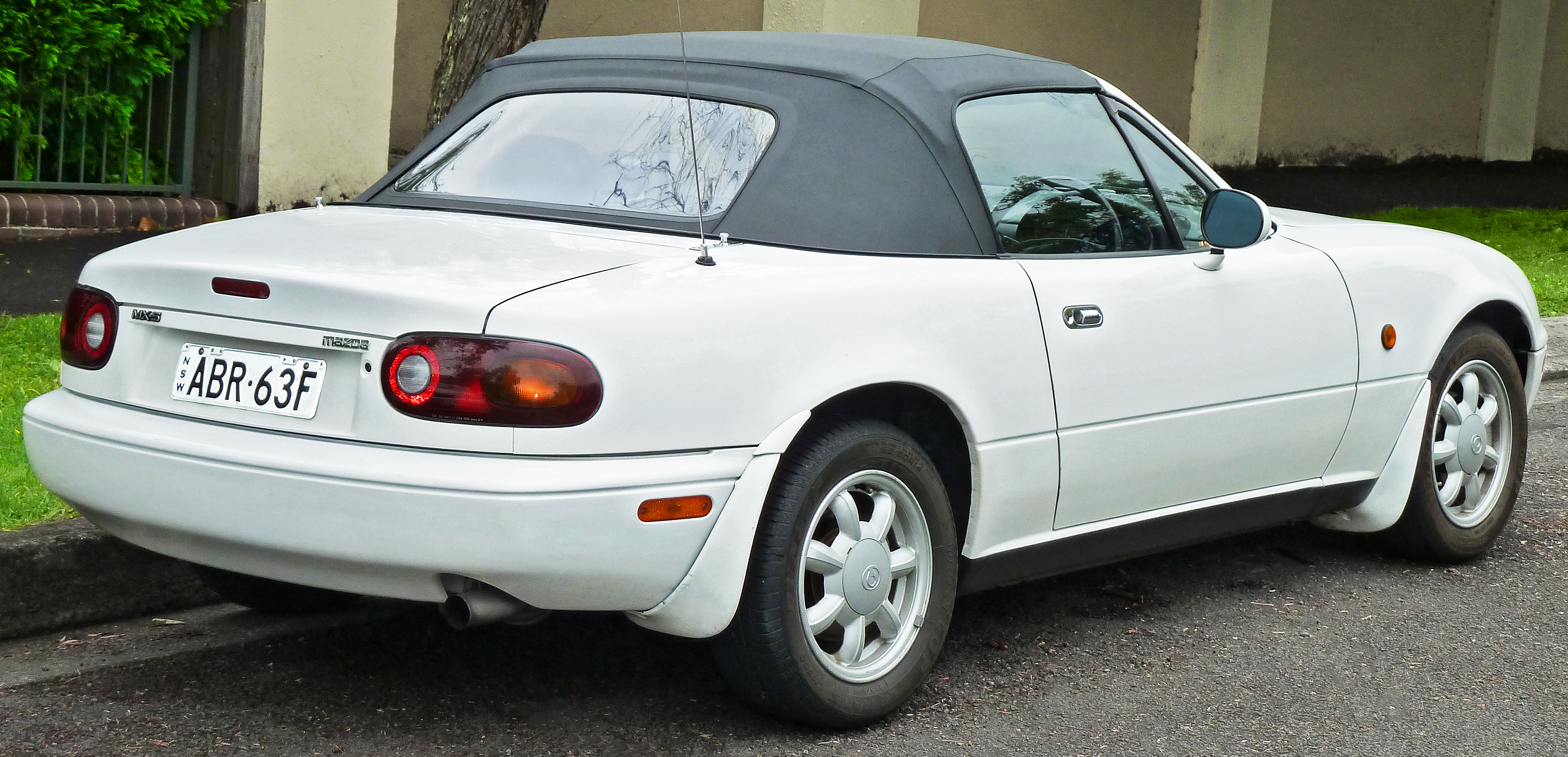
Facelift Mazda MX-5 (Australia)

1991 and 1993 J Limited

For the Eunos Roadster's 2nd Anniversary in 1991. This model features a special sunburst yellow body color for Japan market. "J" comes from the French word for yellow, "jaune."

J LIMITED II released in December 1993. Same exterior color as the J LIMITED released two years ago. However, the A-pillars are blacked out and the aluminum wheel design is also different. Both J LIMITED and J LIMITED II, 800 units was produced.

1991 Limited Edition (UK)

250 examples sold from March '91, produced in British Racing Green with tan interior, to celebrate the 1st anniversary of the MX-5 in the UK. These have a numbered brass plaque on the passenger-side padded dashboard and on the front of the Owners Book, and are fitted with colour-matched 15" OZ alloy wheels from MSW (Mazda Sports Workshop) which are often mistaken for BBS, but which are unique to this model. Other features were power steering, central locking, a wooden steering wheel, hand-brake grip and gear knob, and a distinctive analogue clock. The engine is the standard 1.6L.

1991 Special Edition

Limited to 3,997 units in the United States / 1,051 in Canada, this edition of the MX-5 NA was offered only in British racing green with tan leather interior and tonneau cover and featured a wooden Nardi shift knob and handbrake lever, stainless steel door sills, air conditioning, CD player, cruise control, and headrest speakers.

1992 Sunburst

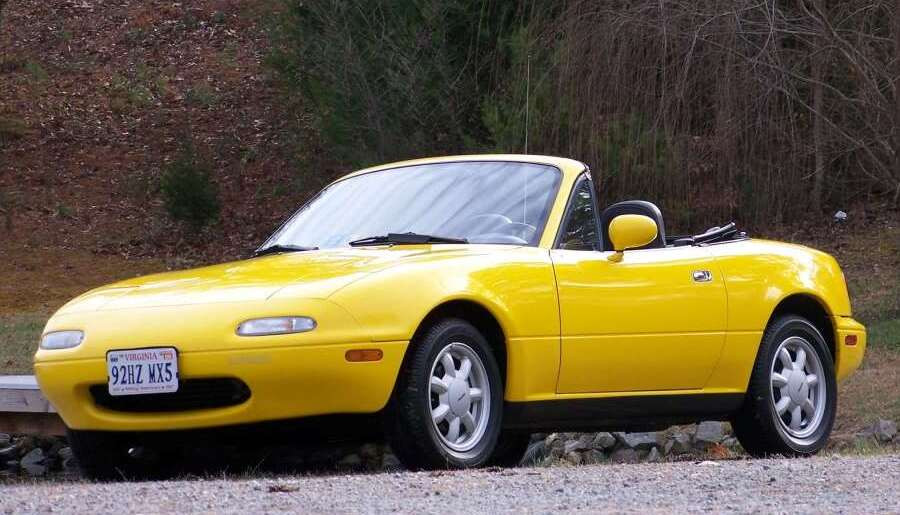
Mazda MX-5 Miata Sunburst

A US$250 option for the exclusive Sunburst Yellow color, limited to 1,519 units in the USA / 503 in Canada.

1992 Black Miata

Limited to 4,625 units, this edition was offered only in Brilliant Black with tan leather interior - they were also offered with the "C" package, which included a Nardi shift knob and handbrake lever and special 14-inch BBS wheels.

1993 Limited Edition

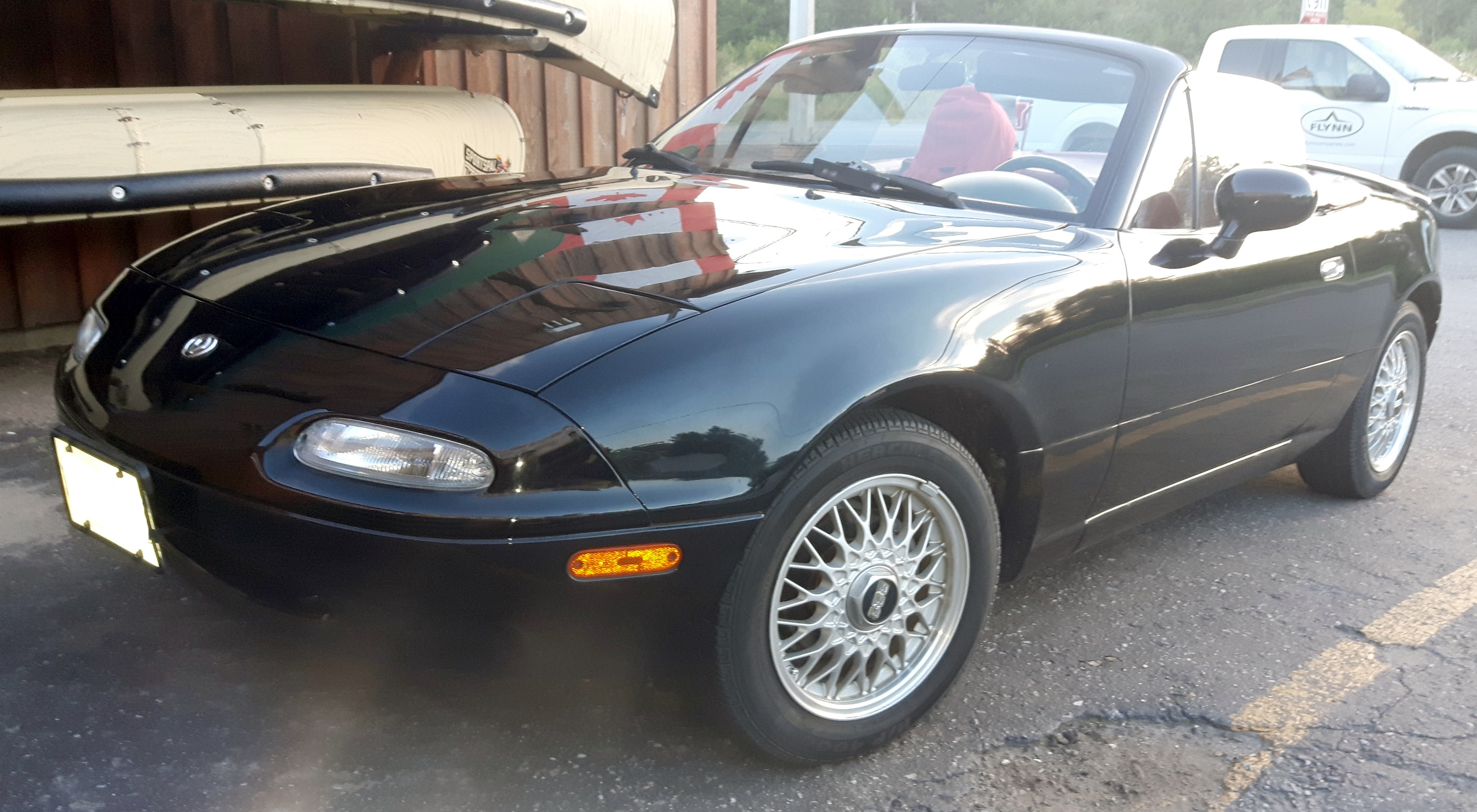
1993 Mazda MX-5 Miata Limited Edition

Limited to 1,505 units in the USA / 300 in Canada, this Limited Edition model was equipped similarly to the 1992 Black Miata, but with red leather interior, sport suspension, front and rear spoilers, rear skirt, air conditioning, headrest speakers and 14-inch BBS wheels.

1993 Energia Electric Vehicle

In 1993, Mazda partnered with the Chugoku Electric Power Company to produce an electric prototype called the "Energia Electric Vehicle." The prototype had a top speed of 130 km/h (81 mph) and had a range of 180 km (110 miles). It was also significantly heavier, weighing 1,410 kg (3,110 lb).

1994 M-Edition

Limited to 3,000 units for the US, the M-Edition introduced the Montego Blue Mica exterior color and was equipped similarly to the 1992 Black Miata, but with power windows, power mirrors, a Torsen limited-slip differential and special M-Edition badges.

1994-1997 R-Package

While the R-Package was never officially a special edition, only 1841 were produced for the USA. The R-package was sold with the upgraded Torsen rear differential, stiffer springs and sway bars, Bilstein shock absorbers, front air dam, and rear spoiler. There was not any option for power steering, an automatic transmission, or leather seats. Air conditioning was optional.

1995 M-Edition

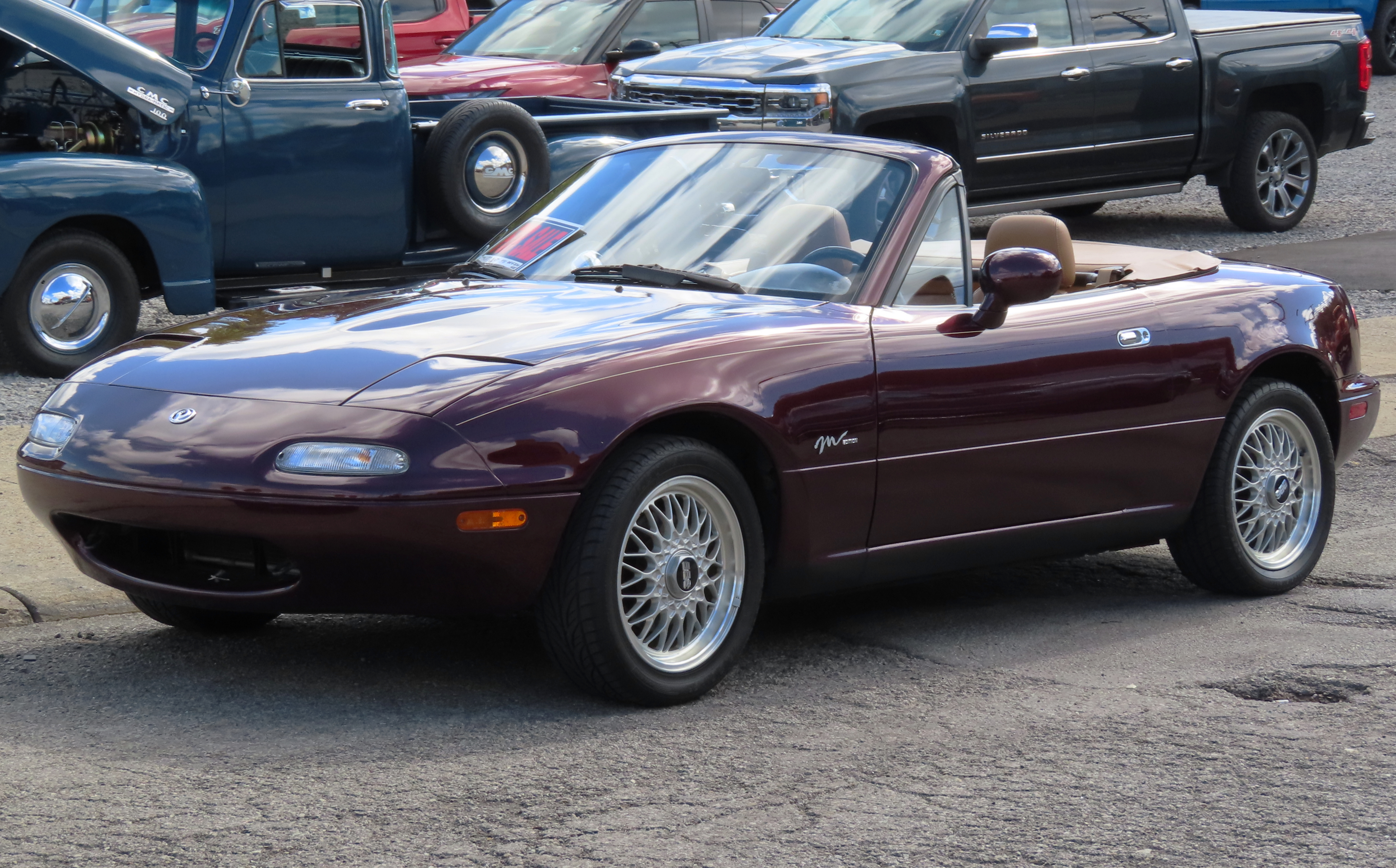
1995 Mazda MX-5 Miata M Edition

An upgrade to the 1994 M-Edition in Merlot Mica with adjustable headrests and 15-inch BBS wheels, this M-Edition MX-5 was limited to 3,500 units for the USA.

1995 M Speedster Concept

A one-off concept featuring large fog lights and a smaller windshield with the side mirrors mounted on it.

1996 M-Edition

The 1996 M-Edition was in Starlight Blue Mica and added an alarm system and used 15-inch Enkei wheels. A total of 3,000 units were manufactured for the USA.

1996 M Coupe Concept

Introduced at the 1996 New York International Auto Show, this concept was a fixed hardtop version of the MX-5.

1997 M-Edition

The final M-Edition was offered in Marina Green Mica and limited to 3,000 units in the USA.

1997 Speedster Edition

For the Canadian market, the Speedster Edition was the same color as the US-market's 1997 M-Edition in Marina Green Mica but had the 1996 M-Edition's Enkei wheels, "Speedster Edition" badging, and a Torsen LSD, but black cloth seats. Limited to 150 units in Canada.

1997 Special Touring Option

Advertised by Mazda USA as "Still The One" and limited to 1,500 units, the Special Touring Option (STO) was offered in Twilight Blue Mica and featured the exterior options of the 1996 M-Edition, but lacked the Torsen differential, cruise control, premium stereo, and hardtop (which elicited the other nickname of "Stuff Taken Off").

1997 Monza Edition

For the UK market, with only 800 made. Featured green paint, unique 14-inch alloy wheels, "Monza" decals, basic trim and the basic 1.6 L engine.

1998 Berkeley Limited Edition

Limited to 400 units sold exclusively to the UK market, with a numbered plaque on the centre tunnel denominating which car it was of the final 400 made. The cars were all finished in Sparkle Green, and had unique 15" alloys, Berkeley Badging, chrome boot rack, and a Momo leather steering wheel. The vehicle was marketed in conjunction with a promotion where customers whom registered interest in the models available could would win tickets to stay in The Berkeley Hotel in London.

=== M2 special editions ===
A small range of Eunos Roadster units were assembled by the M2 Corporation. Founded in November 1991, M2, also known as "Mazda Too", was Mazda's new off-line planning / niche-house / Research & Development company back in the early '90s. M2 employees had noble intentions — creating niche-mobiles derived from Mazda's volume products. Although M2's basic mission involved focusing on the "soft" aspects of vehicle design in an attempt to create more specifically targeted niche variants, the changes to the off-line cars would go well beyond mere cosmetics.

Heading the M2 operation was Mr. Masakatsu Kato, original father of the Miata (Eunos Roadster) in Japan, as well as creator of several Mazda concept vehicles. Kato-san was assisted by Hirotaka Tachibana, development engineer responsible for the superb dynamics of the Mazda FC (second generation RX-7) and the NA Roadster. M2 was based out of Tokyo, Japan. M2 was a 100% owned subsidiary of Mazda, and it was closed by Mazda in 1995. Mazda kept a similar program going with the Mazdaspeed vehicles, and then in the late '90s Mazdaspeed was absorbed into Mazda as a subsidiary company in Mazda Auto Tokyo. There were many types of M2 branded vehicles between 1991 and 1995, beginning with the 1001 up to the 1031 Cafe Racer (Dec-91).

M2-1001 Cafe Roadster (Limited 1/300)

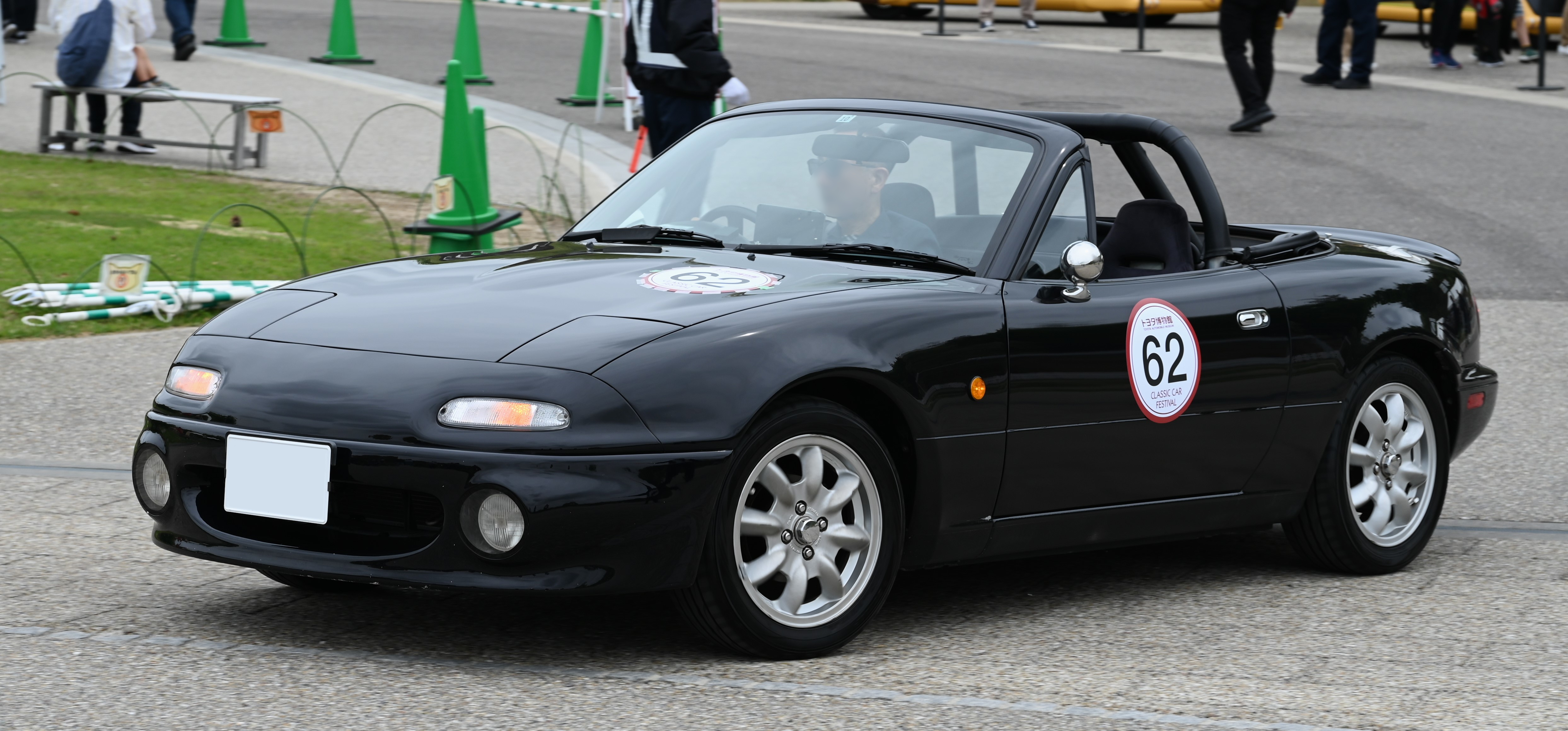
M2-1001 Cafe Roadster

M2 released the M2-1001 Roadster in December 1991. It was a special "Limited Production" Roadster variant that was a short production run of only 300 units, in a special Blue/Black Mica Paint, with a sticker price of $26,000. Prospective buyers were required to show up in person at M2's Tokyo headquarters to register for a lottery to place an order for this extremely limited Roadster.

This upscale Roadster was M2's first turn-key, race-ready offering. A list of popular features, while not exhaustive, is as follows: functional front airdam with integrated fog lamps, vintage aero mirrors, 4-point roll bar, vintage gauge cluster, fixed back bucket seats, polished 3-spoke steering wheel, stiffer suspension package with M2 specific rates, polished aluminum strut brace, upgraded exhaust by HKS, intake system, 1.6 L motor with new aggressive pistons, upgraded camshaft, lightweight flywheel, LSD cooling intake, manual steering, manual windows (A/C was optional), racing pedals, centerless console with matching shortened radio bezel, aluminum gas filler cap, a more aggressive wheel & tire package (15- x 6-inch Panasport rims), and a rear spoiler (which became standard for the R package). The performance changes made to the Roadster would bump the power to 98 kW (131 bhp) at 7,000 rpm, and 148 N⋅m (109 lbf⋅ft) of torque at 5,500 rpm. Once released, it proved so popular that people were paying up to $35,000 for one.

M2-1002 Vintage Roadster (Limited 1/300)

M2 released its second Roadster in November 1992, with a slightly different front bumper but all the same items as the previous 1001 Roadster. This one did not do as well as the 1001.

M2-1028 Street Competition Roadster (Limited 1/300)

M2 released its third Roadster in February 1994, based on the original "Jinba Ittai" concept made by Toshihiko Hirai. This was billed as a track-ready Roadster. (The US saw a cheaper version known as the R-Package.) Offered in Chaste White or Brilliant Black only, this Roadster used the new 1.8 L powerplant with upgraded pistons, camshafts, and other similar goodies as the previous 1001 and 1002. This Roadster had an output of close to 110 kW (150 bhp), and included 14-inch Eunos Factory Rims with a unique gunmetal paint with polished lip. The only real changes were a new set of lightweight side mirrors, MOMO Steering Wheel, centerless console, racing seats, racing tow hook, a set of lower lip spoilers (R-Package), and a newly designed "Duck-Tail" trunk lid with integrated spoiler. The M2-1028 trunk lid was made from aluminum and weighed only 3.5 kg (7.7 lb), a very light weight from the original lid of 7.0 kg (15.4 lb). It also came with a 6-point roll cage, but no soft-top, instead featuring a tarp that stretched over the cage. With optional FRP Hardtop with plexiglass rear window for more weight savings coming in at only 8.6 kg (19 lb).

== Factory restoration program ==
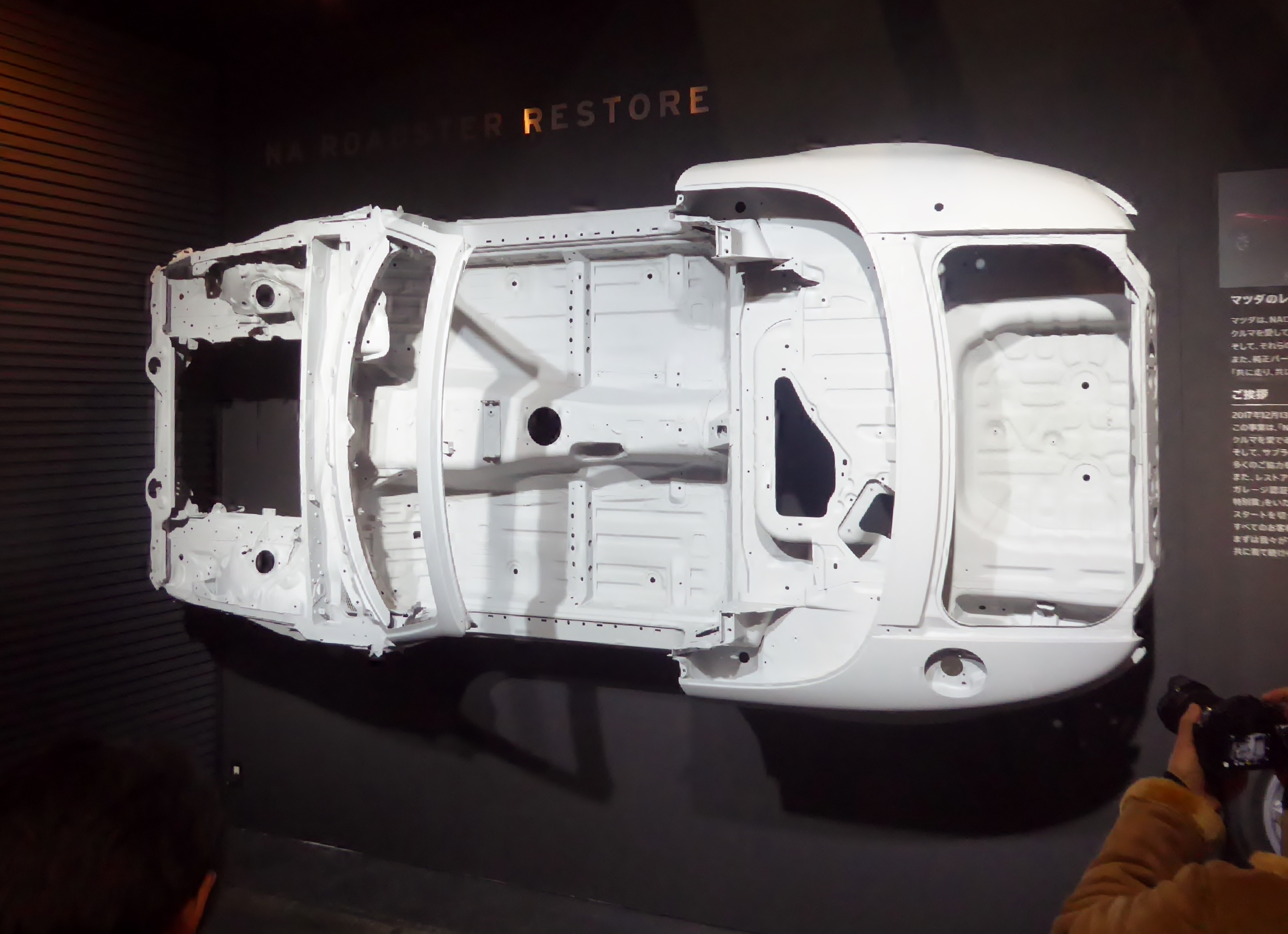
The MX-5 NA's unibody on display at the 2018 Osaka Auto Messe.

In 2018, Mazda began a factory restoration program for Eunos Roadster owners in Japan. The work is performed at the Hiroshima Factory where all Roadsters are built. The program offers a choice for each car to be fully restored to factory-spec using OEM parts, or selected restoration options. All work is then certified by TÜV Rheinland. When the program was announced over 600 owners applied for the restoration program. Not all NA series can be restored and conditions are listed.

On September 27, 2018, Mazda unveiled the first fully restored Roadster: a 1992 V-Special in British racing green with tan leather interior. The car belongs to tomato farmer Keiji Nishimoto, who has owned it since new.

The Automotive Researchers' and Journalists' Conference of Japan gave the program a Special Award for Classic Car Restoration Service at the 2018 RJC Car of the Year Awards.

On October 28, 2019, Mazda announced that they will introduce select reproduction parts for North American MX-5 Miata NA owners. All parts will be manufactured using modern methods and materials while retaining the original look and feel of that era. Enkei will reproduce the original alloy wheels, but with a lighter weight and a more durable finish.

== Awards and recognition ==
- Automobile Magazine 1990 "Automobile of the Year"
- Car and Driver's 10Best list from 1990 to 1992
- 2018 RJC Car of the Year Special Award: Classic Car Restoration Service
- A red 1990 Eunos Roadster is in the collection of the Haynes International Motor Museum at Sparkford near Yeovil in England, where it is on display in the Red Room which is dedicated to sports and touring cars, all of which are in a shade of red.
- Japan Automotive Hall of Fame 2019 Special Award: Historic Car

== Specifications ==
UK drivetrain specifications:

Drivetrain specifications by generation (UK market)
Model year(s)	Model no(s).	Chassis code(s)	Engine type	Engine code	Transmission(s)	Power@rpm	Torque@rpm	Redline
1990–1993	1.6i	NA	1.6 L inline-4	B6ZE(RS)	5-speed MT	85 kW (114 hp) @ 6,500	136 N⋅m (100 ft⋅lbf) @ 5,500	7,200 rpm
1994–1998	1.6i	NA	1.6 L inline-4	B6ZE(RS)	5-speed MT	66 kW (88 hp)	-	
1994–1995	1.8i	NA	1.8 L inline-4	BP-ZE	5-speed MT	95 kW (128 hp) @ 6,500	149 N⋅m (110 ft⋅lbf) @ 5,000	7,000 rpm
1996–1997	1.8i	NA	1.8 L inline-4	BP-ZE	5-speed MT	99 kW (133 hp) @ 6,500	155 N⋅m (114 ft⋅lbf) @ 5,500	7,000 rpm
