= Chuck Jordan (automobile designer) =

American automobile designer

Charles Morrell "Chuck" Jordan
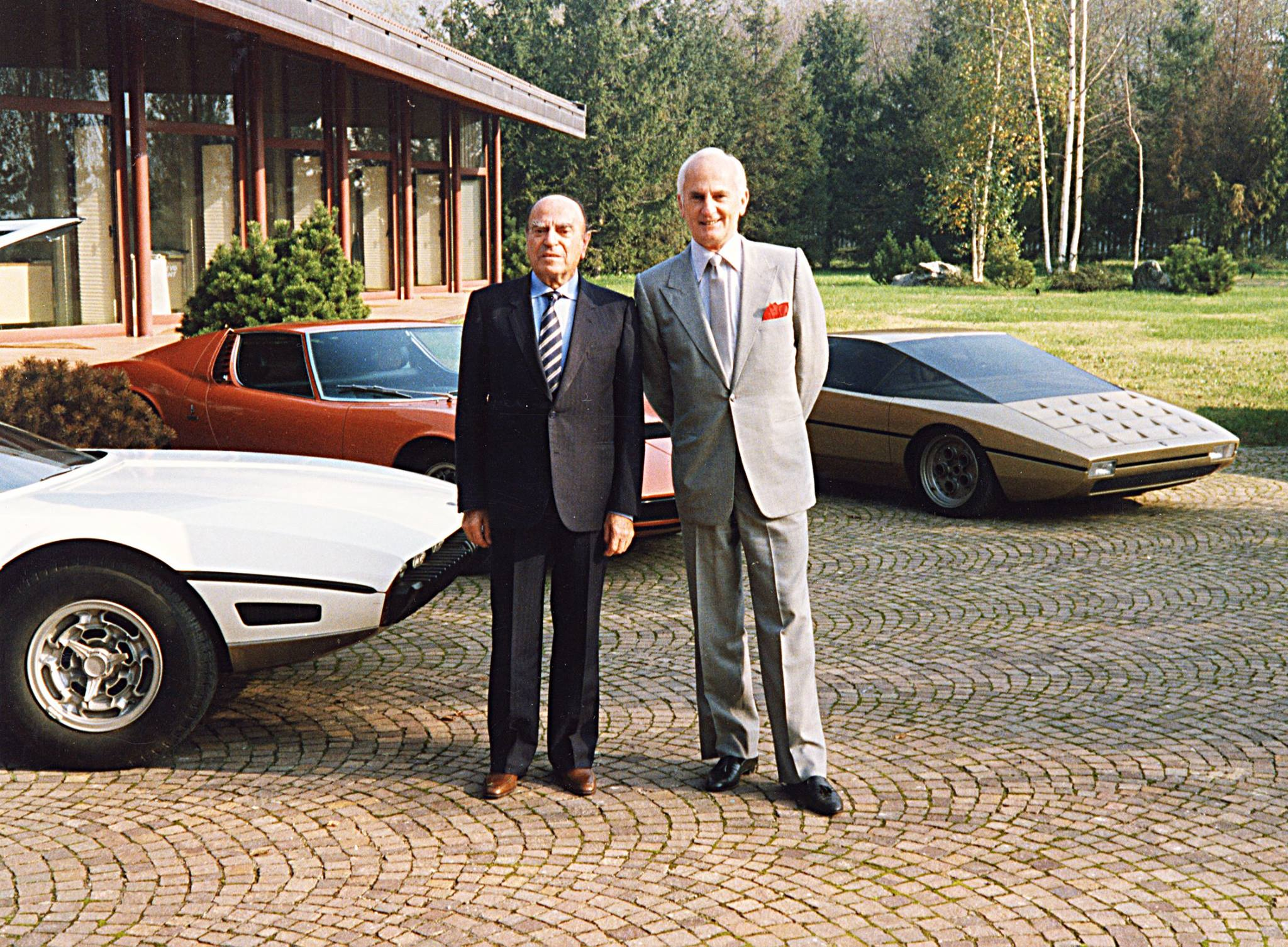
- Chuck (right) next to Nuccio Bertone at Stile Bertone
- Born: October 21, 1927; Whittier, California, U.S.
- Died: December 9, 2010 (aged 83); Rancho Santa Fe, California, U.S.
- Occupation: Automobile designer
- Known for: GM VP of Design (1986-1992)

Charles Morrell Jordan (October 21, 1927 – December 9, 2010) was an American automotive designer, widely known for his role as vice president of design for General Motors from 1986 to 1992 — and his work on prominent GM models, including the 1959-1960 Cadillac Eldorado and the 1992 Cadillac Seville STS.

== Background ==
Born in Whittier, California, and noted for sketching during school classes, as young as age eight, Jordan graduated with honors from Fullerton Union High School in 1945, studying at MIT before joining GM in 1949.

Jordan died in December 2010 in Rancho Santa Fe, California of lymphoma, survived by his wife Sally, two daughters, and son, Mark Jordan, a designer for GM and Mazda.

== Career ==
While a junior at MIT, Chuck entered the first post war Fisher Body Craftsman's Guild competition, winning first prize and a $4000 scholarship. At the award ceremony, Jordan accepted an invitation from Harley Earl's assistant Howard O'Leary, inviting Jordan to come to GM when he completed his studies. Jordan accepted in 1949, leading to his career at GM.

One of his first projects was the Aerotrain, completed when he was 28. He rose to director of design for Cadillac in 1957, being chief designer of the 1959 Cadillac, an epitome of fin design (although it was well underway when he arrived.) He also spent time with GM Europe as head of design for Opel.

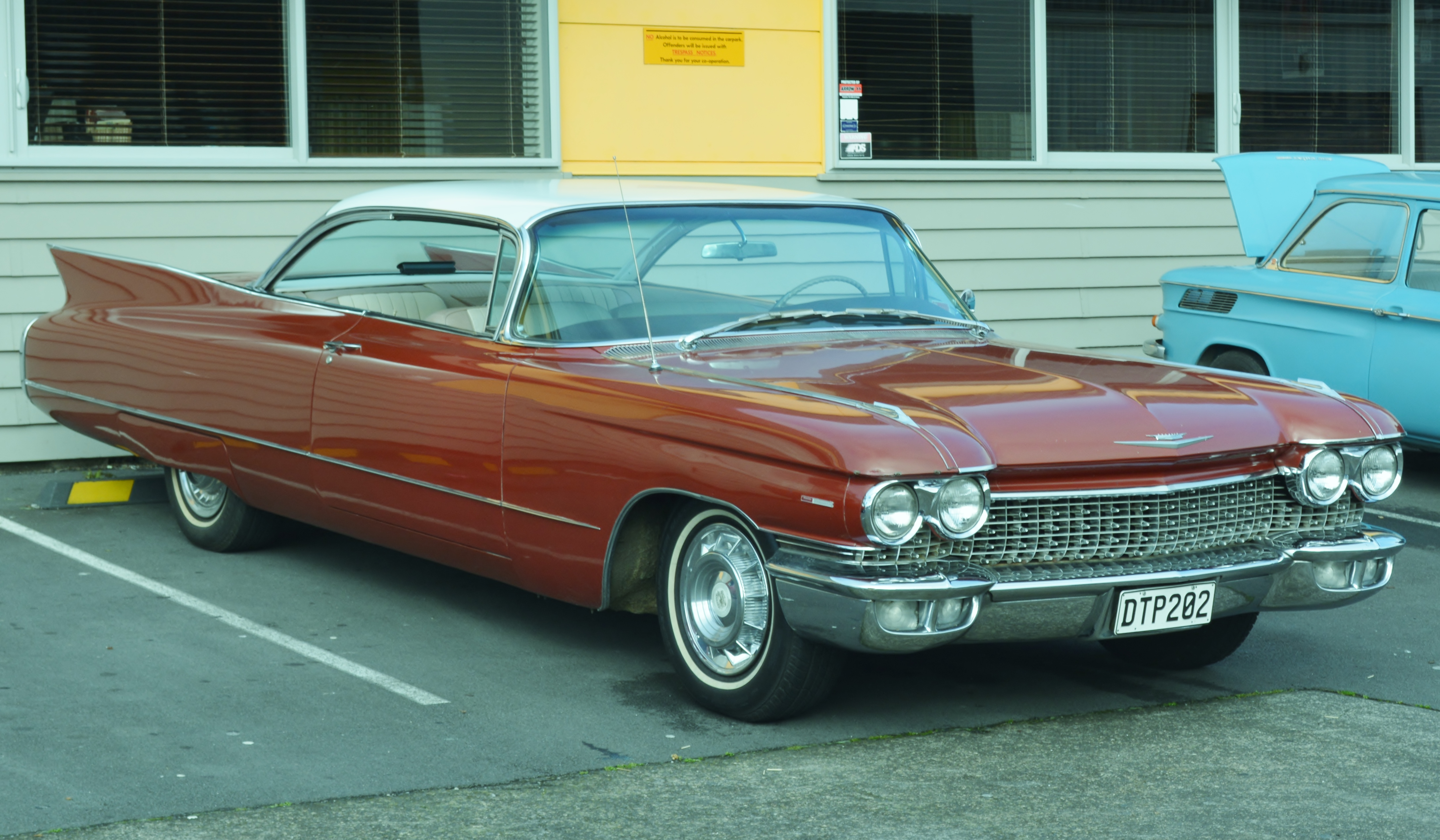
1960 Cadillac Coupe De Ville

He was Vice President of Design for General Motors from 1986 to 1992, one of seven to have held the position, including Harley Earl, Bill Mitchell, Irv Rybicki, Wayne Cherry, Ed Welburn and Michael Simcoe.

Jordan's design work includes:

- 1959-1960 Cadillac
- 1968-1973 Opel GT
- 1971-1975 Opel Manta A
- 1971-1975 Opel Ascona A
- 1973-1977 Opel Commodore B
- 1991-1996 Oldsmobile 98
- 1992-1994 Chevrolet K1500 Blazer/GMC K1500 Jimmy
- 1992-1997 Cadillac Seville STS
- 1992-1999 Chevrolet Suburban/GMC Suburban
- 1993-1996 Cadillac Fleetwood
- 1994-1999 Cadillac DeVille
- 1995-2001 Chevrolet Lumina
- 1995-2005 Chevrolet Cavalier
