= Norman Garrett (automotive engineer) =

American Automotive Engineer and professor

Norman H. Garrett III
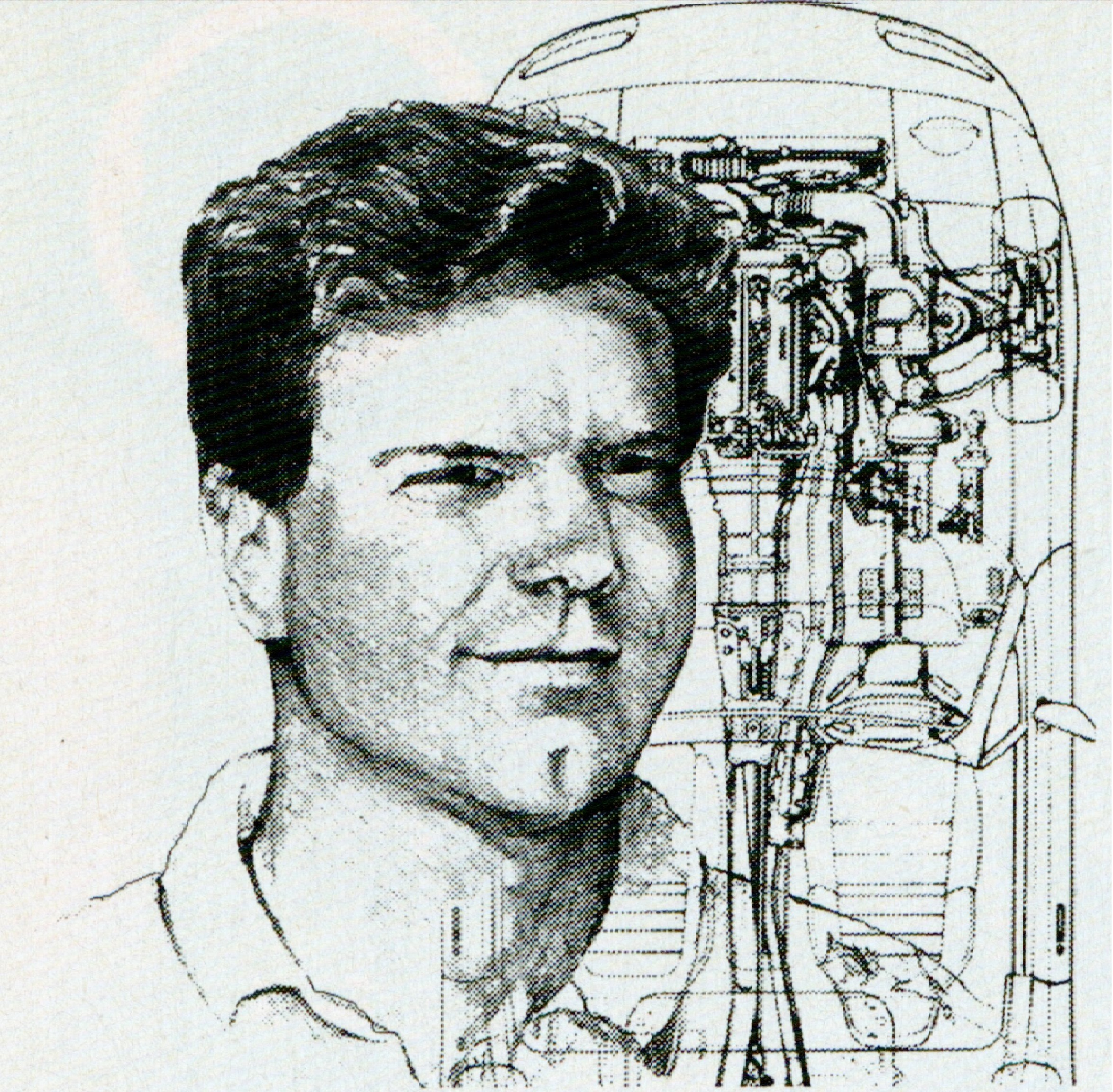
- Born: 1958 (age 67–68); North Carolina
- Education: B.S., Georgia Institute of Technology
- Parent(s): Norman H. Garret, Jr., MD, Rebecca Anne Garrett
- Engineering career
- Discipline: Mechanical engineering, Automotive engineering
- Employers: Subaru; Mazda; Volvo; Husqvarna

Norman H. Garrett III is an automotive engineer best known for his work as the Concept Engineer for the first generation Mazda Miata sports car. His original layout design set the engineering scheme for the dynamic handling, package layout, weight distribution, suspension design, and hard points for the body design for the NA and NB Miata.

== Early life and education ==
Norman H. Garrett III, son of physician Dr. Norman H. Garrett Jr. and nurse Rebecca Anne Garrett, was born in Greensboro, North Carolina, in 1958.

Garrett showed early signs of strong mechanical aptitude, which his parents nourished. He was a voracious reader, spending his afternoons digesting every automotive book in all of the library branches in his home town. When he was 8 years old, his father brought home a old Chevrolet engine for him to disassemble, followed two years later by a junked 1962 Ford as a project car to get running. In middle school, he won various Industrial Arts awards for his novel science projects including a steam jet model car and an AC relay buzzer system made from roofing nails. Like many boys in the 60’s, he received a Heathkit electronic projects his father purchased to introduce his son to electronics and electrical engineering. Garrett raced motocross in his early teens competing privately on Bultaco and Penton motorcycles. He picked up automotive racing at the age of 15 in local SCCA and club events (autocross and track), campaigning a modified Datsun 510 (incorporating parts from Pete Brock's BRE program) and various Porsches. He also competed in Porsche Club of America track events in his prepared 914 2.0.

Garrett was accepted to the Georgia Institute of Technology during his junior year of high school and entered with the goal of becoming a race car designer. While there, in 1981 he earned a Mechanical Engineering Degree with an Automotive Engineering minor. During his tenure at engineering school, Garrett continued his racing efforts, and focused his studies on race car design. He competed with the Georgia Tech Sports Car Club and participated in the early SAE Mini Baja competitions. He served as Technical Director for the school’s Hydrogen Car project, an operational four door passenger car successfully using hydrogen as its sole fuel (using nickel metal hydride for fuel storage). Garrett also studied Acoustic Engineering under Marshall Leach, Ph.D. and undertook many special speaker design projects under his tutelage.

== Career ==
=== Subaru ===
Garrett worked at the Subaru Technical Center in Southern California as a Development & Test Engineer working with managers Roger Banowetz, Ron Jones, and designer Ron Will of GM fame, and under the directorship of the late Walt Biggers. Garrett worked on new product development and prototype testing, and worked on programs with noted automotive designer Alex Tremulis. Efforts focused around new vehicle development and testing, including hot weather testing in Death Valley, California each July.

=== Mazda ===
Garrett was the first American engineer hired by Mazda for their Southern California Design Center and worked on a variety of projects aimed at the U.S. market.

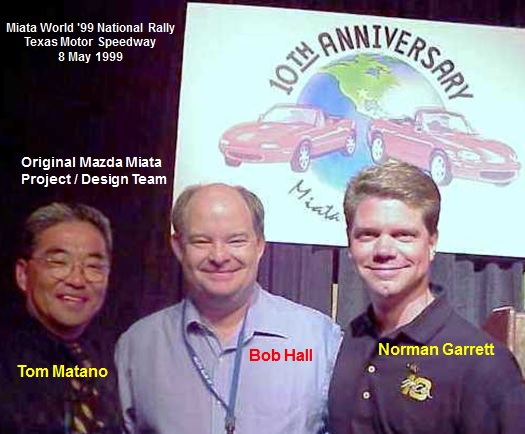

His work on the design package for the "Light Weight Sports " (aka MX-5 Miata) project, spearheaded by product planner Bob Hall was Garrett’s most notable automotive engineering achievement. Using his racecar engineering background, Garrett’s goal was to make the Miata as great to drive as it was to look at, with a focus on eventual spec-class racing (taking his learnings from his Porsche and Datsun racing experience). This involved developing the architecture of the Miata’s structural elements, suspension, engine and powerplant, human occupants, etc. so that they would fit under the bodywork being "styled" by the studio’s designers.

Garrett worked with body designers Wu Huang Chin, Mark Jordan, and Yagi-san. This styling team was managed by supervisor Tom Matano and K. Hayashi and on other new products developed by the studio, all reporting to S. Fukuda who was Design Director for the studio. Product Planner Jim Kilborne aided the customer requirement scope for the project. Garrett's technical layout for the Miata was the road map for the difficult work of productionizing the concept, achieved by Project Manager Toshihiko Hirai and his team of engineers at Mazda's headquarters in Hiroshima, Japan. Members of this team included Takao Kijima, T. Watanabe, S. Kubo, Jiro Maebayashi, and others. The collaboration between the US studio and Mazda’s headquarters was unique, and the passion that was poured into the P729 project on both shores created a very successful product in the MX-5 Miata.

Garrett has said, "In the Miata, from the concept that a bunch of wild-eyed Americans had in ’83 to what you can buy today, there’s not a single compromise." The MX-5 Miata has become the best-selling and most-raced sports car in automotive history. Garrett also served as a prototype test engineer, coordinating test excursions to test sites in the Southwestern U.S. and various race tracks.

Garrett left Mazda and returned to the Southeastern U.S. to pursue independent engineering opportunities involving technology transfers funded by venture capitalists. As a hobby, he started the Miata Club of America (MCA) with former engineering college roommate Vince Tidwell and Barbara Beach. The Miata Club of America grew to be the largest car club in the world at the time, with over 35,000 members and 100 local chapters. Garrett published Miata Magazine in his spare time, a six-issue per year publication with an annual circulation of over 100,000 copies.

== Research programs ==
=== In-Cylinder Combustion Flame Propagation ===
In 1995, Garrett established a research laboratory at his alma mater, Georgia Tech, for the study of combustion engine ignition characteristics, working with his mentor, Dr. Sam Shelton. Garrett was one of the first researchers to develop real-time in-cylinder pressure measurements of simultaneous cylinders using digital data acquisition. This work resulted in U.S. Patent No. 6,948,495 for an advanced ignition electrode, which was licensed to a marketing firm and has become the E3 Spark Plug product line, a brand developed by long-time friend Mark Wronski. The company is run by Todd Arey, a maternal cousin of Garrett.

=== Forced Induction of IC Engines ===
In 1994 Garrett negotiated a joint-effort with Eaton Corporation, creating a company named Sebring Superchargers marketing OE-level supercharger systems based on a proprietary version of the Eaton Roots-type supercharger. Garrett partnered with accomplished Mazda race driver Jim Downing to market his systems for Mazda and BMW applications, while working with Oscar Jackson of Jackson Racing to create Honda applications. The company was sold to Moss Motors in 1999 and woven into the Jackson Racing Supercharger brand.

=== Sonochemistry ===
Garrett established a second research lab at Georgia Tech to develop high-throughput chemical reactors using fluidic cavitation. Cavitation in fluids can produce high temperatures and pressures, sufficient to break molecular Van der Waals bonds and produce previously unavailable chemical reactions and processes. Building on the then-emerging sonochemical reactors being developed at the University of Illinois, Garrett developed a tensile/densifying centrifuge that was able to produce the highest recorded levels of sonoluminescence, the metric used to determine cavitation intensity. Garrett engaged Ken Suslick, Ph.D., of the University of Illinois at Urbana-Champaign and Michael Hoffman, Ph.D., of Caltech (known experts in the fluid cavitation field) as advisors in this research program. U.S. Patent 6,974,305 was awarded to Garrett for his novel cavitation reactor.

=== Nanotechnology ===
Garrett worked as Executive Vice President on a venture productionizing a novel nanofilm material technology in cooperation with the High Temperature Materials Laboratory at the Oak Ridge National Laboratory. The science incorporated an infused nanofilm of various oxides useful in fuel cells, high temperature materials, catalytic surfaces, and other applications. Garrett authored numerous patent applications including those for U.S. Patent 9,625,079, 20090098289, and 10344389. The venture is active today as FCET. Garrett also worked on nanocoolant products, wherein small doses of copper or aluminum nanoparticles are added to engine coolants to improve cooling performance.

=== VAZTEC Rotary Valve ===
In 2020 Garrett joined VAZTEC, a technology transfer company commercializing a viable rotary valve system as a replacement for poppet valves in internal combustion engines. The project is working with a variety of OE manufacturers to implement the technology into specific markets. Benefits include higher power density, lower cost, very high engine RPM speeds, and low vibration. One application of the rotary valve technology has created the highest-power and highest RPM level four stroke engine for non-road applications.

== Academics ==
Adjunct Professorships: Garrett has taught at Georgia Tech, instructing classes in Automotive Engineering focused on Internal Combustion Engine Design. He currently teaches in the Motorsports Engineering department at the University of North Carolina at Charlotte where he instructs classes in Automotive Powerplant Design to graduate and undergraduate students.

== Publications ==
- Garrett, Norman (1998), Mazda Miata Performance Handbook, Motorbooks International, p. 9, ISBN 0-7603-0437-8.
- ASME Paper: AOJE-22-1025 A CFD Investigation Comparing the Performance of an Alternative Valvetrain Design.
- SAE Paper: 2022-32-0028 Development of a Rotary Valve Engine
- SAE Paper: 2023-01-1613 Experimental Comparison of a Rotary Valvetrain
- Society of Automotive Engineers; Manuscript Editor, "Automotive Engineering Fundamentals " – 2000
- Automotive Journalism author: Hagerty Media, Grassroots Motorsports, Miata Magazine, Sports Cars Illustrated

== Patents ==
- Spark Plug Providing Improved Operating Characteristics
- Roto-dynamic Fluidic Systems
- Ground Electrode for Spark Plug
- Methods for providing prophylactic surface treatment for fluid processing systems
- Method for Applying Prophylactic Surface Treatments
- Engine With Rotating Valve Assembly
- Nanoparticle-based Improved Engine Coolant; Patent pending

== Awards and recognition ==
- Council of Outstanding Young Engineers – Georgia Tech: 1998
- SAE/SETC 2022 Japan: High Quality Presentation Award – Development of a Rotary Valve Engine
- 2023 SAE Excellence in Oral Presentation Award - Experimental Comparison of a Rotary Valvetrain
