= Mazda North American Operations =

Mazda's North American arm

Coordinates: 33.6588726°N 117.7482629°W

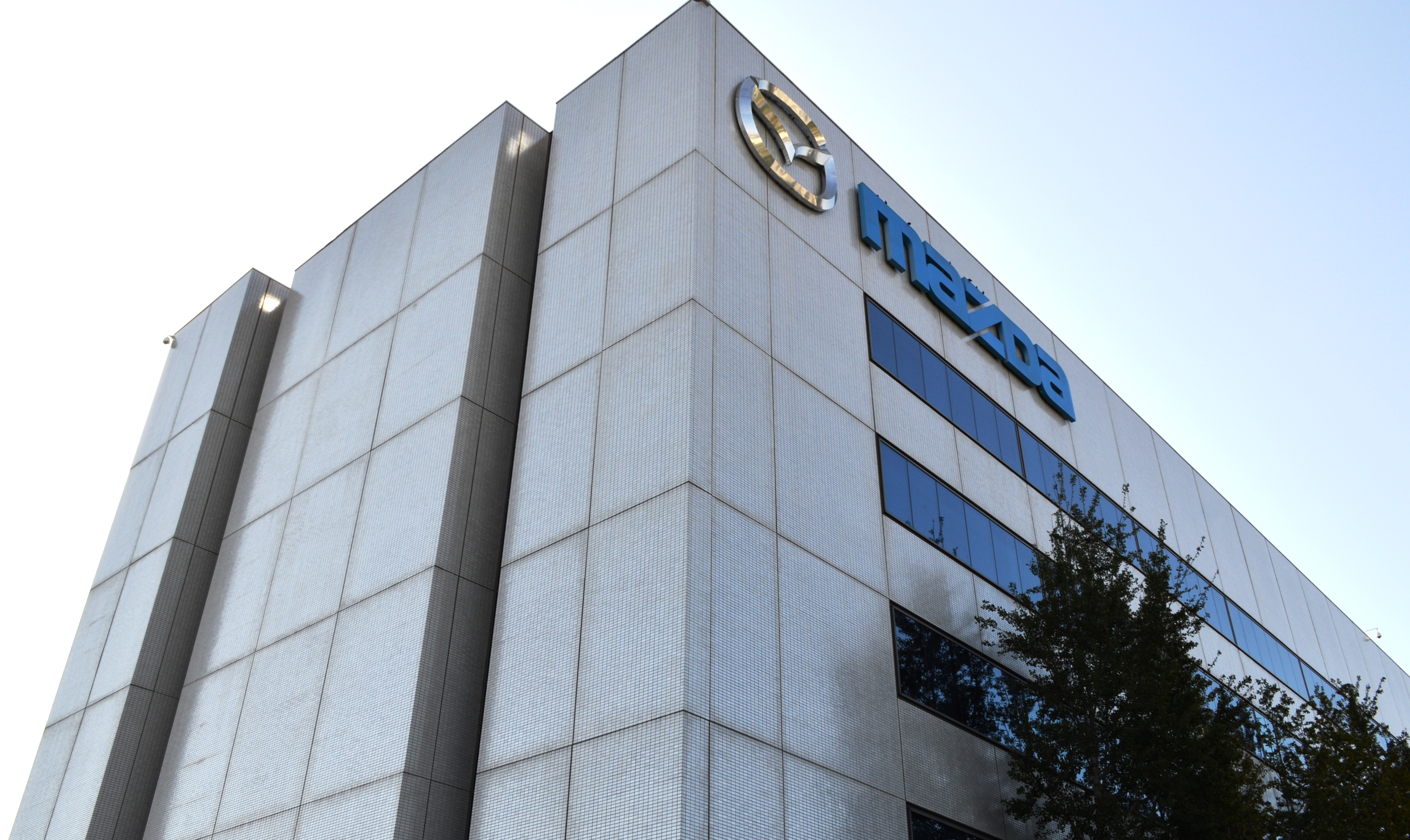
- Industry: Automotive
- Founded: 1970
- Headquarters: Irvine, California
- Products: Automobiles
- Number of employees: 1,000
- Website: Mazda North American Operations

Mazda North American Operations (MNAO), which includes Mazda Motor of America, Inc., is Mazda Motor Corporation's North American arm, and constitutes the largest component of that company outside Japan. The company has its headquarters in Irvine, California and is headed by Jeffrey Guyton.

== History ==
Toyo Kogyo entered the United States market as Mazda Motor America (MMA) in 1970 with a single car, the RX-2. The next year there were five cars: the compact Familia-based 1200 and R100, the larger Capella-based 616 and RX-2 and the large 1800. For 1972, the line expanded again with the addition of the RX-3 and B1600; the 1200 and 616 were replaced by the similar 808 and 618, respectively; the 1800 was discontinued. The piston-powered 618 was gone the next year, as was the R100, but the 1.2 L 1200 was back for a single year.

Mazda quickly rose in prominence, helped in large part to their use of Wankel engines. 1974 was the year of the rotary with the introduction of both the Rotary Pickup and RX-4. In fact, the 808 and B1600 were the only piston-engined Mazdas offered in the United States that year. 1975 had a similar lineup, minus the retired RX-2.

Mazda had designed the REPU and RX-4 with the American market in mind, but the energy crisis was looming. The company's sales were slipping due to the Wankel's reputation as a gas hog, so Mazda responded with the reintroduction of a Familia-based car powered by a tiny piston engine, the 1.3 L Mizer. That car, and 1977 GLC (its next-generation brother) saved the company in the United States with favorable reviews and better sales.

Also introduced in 1976 was the Wankel-powered RX-5 Cosmo. But the writing was on the wall for Mazda's mainstream Wankel lineup – every one of the older "rotary" models was cancelled after 1978. Even though the Wankel engine had lost its allure, Mazda persevered with the technology and found a niche for it. The 1979 RX-7 rotary was a halo car, with higher performance than its piston-engined running-mates. Also relaunched that year was the company's entrant in the midsize market, the 626.

The RX-7 and 626 buoyed Mazda's American fortunes enough for it to expand. Mazda built an American plant (now Flat Rock Assembly Plant) to build the 626, bringing the company to Ford's attention. The two joined on the 626's 2-door offshoots, the MX-6 and Ford Probe.

Mazda finished the 1980s the same way as the 1970s, with an image-building sports car. The Miata was another halo car for the company, kicking off an industry boom in the sports car segment. The third-generation RX-7, introduced in 1993, was much liked, but few were sold, causing an end of the model's importation just three years later. In early 1992 Mazda planned to release a luxury marque, Amati, to challenge Acura, Infiniti, and Lexus in North America, which was to begin selling in late 1993. The initial Amati range would have included the Amati 300 (which became the (Eunos 500/Xedos 6) in Japan and Europe), the Amati 500 (which became the Eunos 800 in Japan and Australia, Mazda Millenia in the U.S., and Mazda Xedos 9 in Europe) and a luxury sports coupe based on the Mazda Cosmo. Due to the recession of the early 1990s and the effects of the collapse of the Japanese asset price bubble, Amati was cancelled.

Mazda consolidated its North American operations as Mazda North American Operations in 1997, and had been located at 7755 Irvine Center Drive since 1987, having relocated from Compton, California. Mazda relocated to a new office approximately a half-mile south at 200 Spectrum Center Drive in August 2017, across the street from Irvine Spectrum.

In 2021 Mazda recorded their best selling year in the US since 1994 in selling 332,756 vehicles.

On December 31, 2015, Jim O'Sullivan retired from president and CEO of Mazda North America. Masahiro Moro, former head of the global sales and marketing division, became CEO. In May 2021, Masahiro Moro was appointed to a newly created position within Mazda's headquarters in Japan and was succeeded in his role as president and CEO of Mazda North America by Jeffrey Guyton.

== Vehicles ==
Current Mazda vehicle line for North America:

- Mazda3 — compact car (since 2003)
- CX-30 — subcompact crossover SUV (since 2019)
- CX-5 — compact crossover SUV (since 2012)
- CX-50 — compact crossover SUV (since 2022)
- CX-70 — full-size two-row crossover SUV (since 2024)
- CX-90 — full-size three-row crossover SUV (since 2023)
- MX-5 / Miata — roadster / convertible (since 1989)

== Former products ==
- RX-7 — coupe (1978–1995)
- Mazda MPV — minivan (1989–2006)
- B-Series — pickup truck (1972–2011)
- Tribute — compact SUV (2001–2011)
- CX-3 — crossover SUV (2016–2021)
- CX-7 — crossover SUV (2007–2012)
- CX-9 – crossover SUV (2007–2023)
- RX-8 — coupe (2003–2012)
- Mazda2 — subcompact car (2010–2014)
- Mazda5 — minivan (2005–2015)
- Mazda6 — sedan (2003–2021)
- MX-6 – coupe (1987–1997)
