= Kia Credos =

Mid-size car produced by Kia (1995-2001)

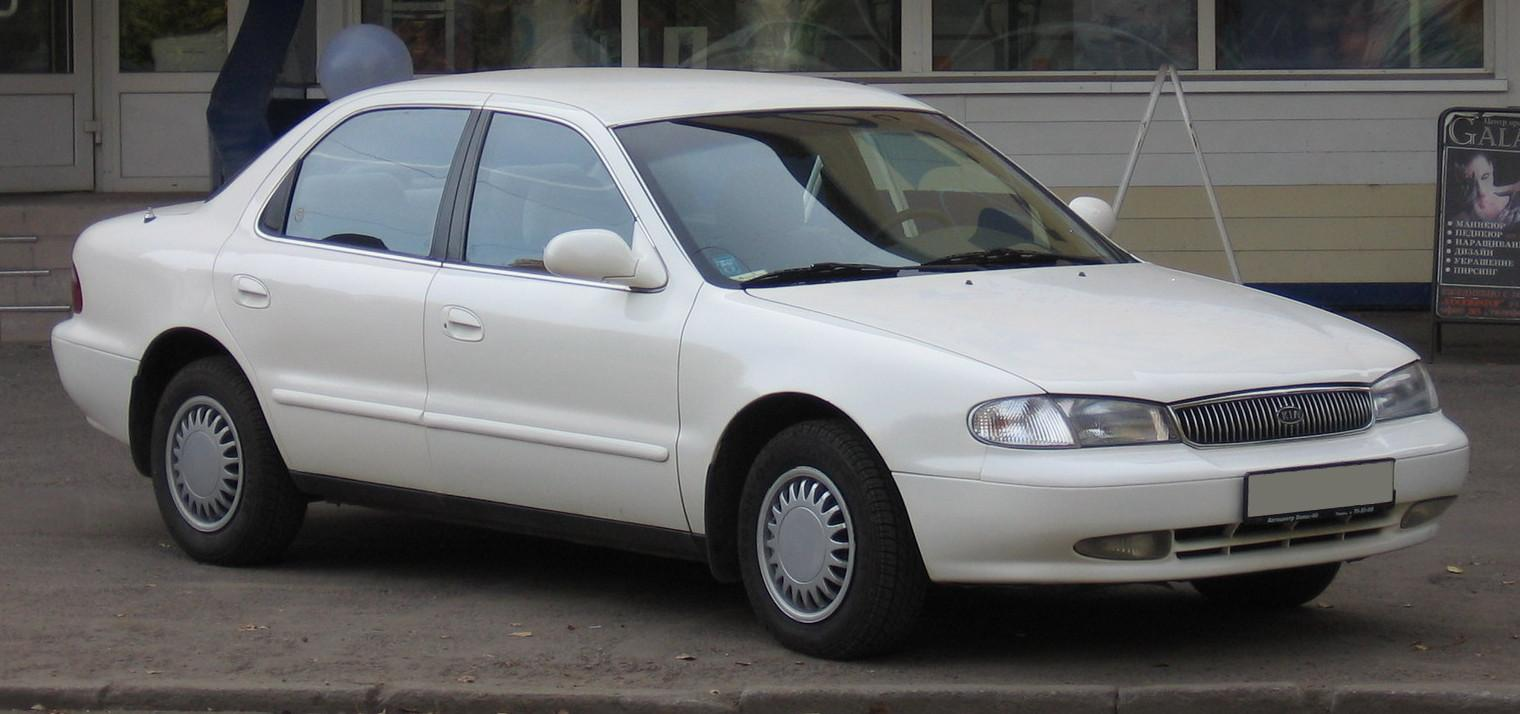
- 1996 Kia Clarus (pre-facelift)

Overview
- Manufacturer: Kia
- Also called: Kia Clarus (Europe); Kia Parktown (South Korea, station wagon)
- Production: 1995–2001
- Assembly: Hwasung Plant, Hwasung, South Korea

Body and chassis
- Class: Mid-size car
- Body style: 4-door sedan 5-door station wagon
- Layout: Front-engine, front-wheel-drive
- Related: Mazda Capella/Cronos/626; Kia Carnival/Sedona

Powertrain
- Engine: 1.8L Kia T8D Engine I4; 2.0L Mazda F I4; 2.5L Rover KV6 V6
- Transmission: 5-speed manual 4-speed automatic

Dimensions
- Wheelbase: 2,665 mm (104.9 in)
- Length: 1995-1998: 4,710 mm (185.4 in); 1998-2001: 4,745 mm (186.8 in); Wagon: 4,760 mm (187.4 in)
- Width: 1,780 mm (70.1 in)
- Height: Sedan: 1,400 mm (55.1 in); Wagon: 1,480 mm (58.3 in)

Chronology
- Predecessor: Kia Concord
- Successor: Kia Optima

The Kia Credos was Kia's first self developed mid-size family sedan, which went on sale in South Korea in 1995, and in Australia in 1998. The Credos is based on the fifth generation Mazda Capella/Cronos, which was also sold as the Mazda 626.

It was powered by one of four gasoline engines. Initially, three engines are offered, depending on the trim: 1.8-litre Kia T8D engine; 2.0-litre Mazda FE SOHC engine; and 2.0-litre Mazda FE-DOHC engine. A fourth engine, a licensed version of 2.0-litre V6 DOHC Rover KV6 engine, was available with the facelifted version from 1998 and on, which also added a station wagon variation, called the Parktown in its native Korea, where it was a commercial flop.

The car's interior was described as dull, but spacious and comfortable, as well as the boot being massive. The asking price for the basic 1.8 SX was £11,000, around £4,000 less than the equivalent Ford Mondeo and Vauxhall Vectra. In Australia, the Credos was introduced in May 1998, and was available only with the 2.0L engine. Sales totaled 839 units during the model's three-year run.

The Kia Credos was replaced by the Hyundai sourced Optima in September 2000, ending the badge engineered relationship with Mazda.

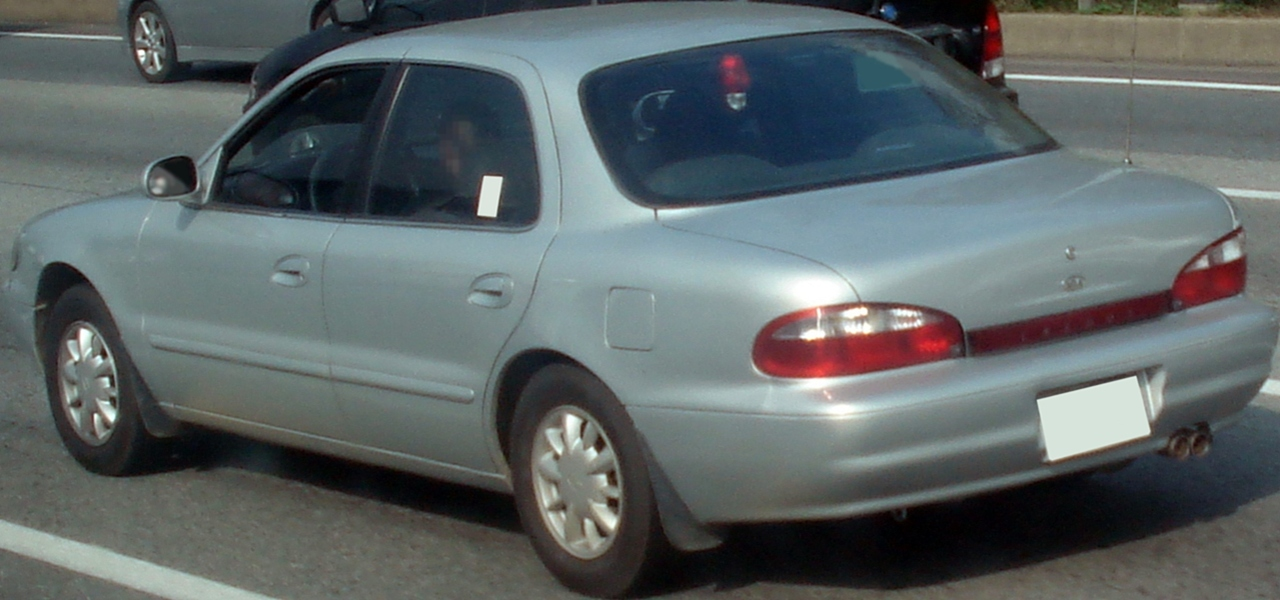
Kia Credos rear (pre-facelift)

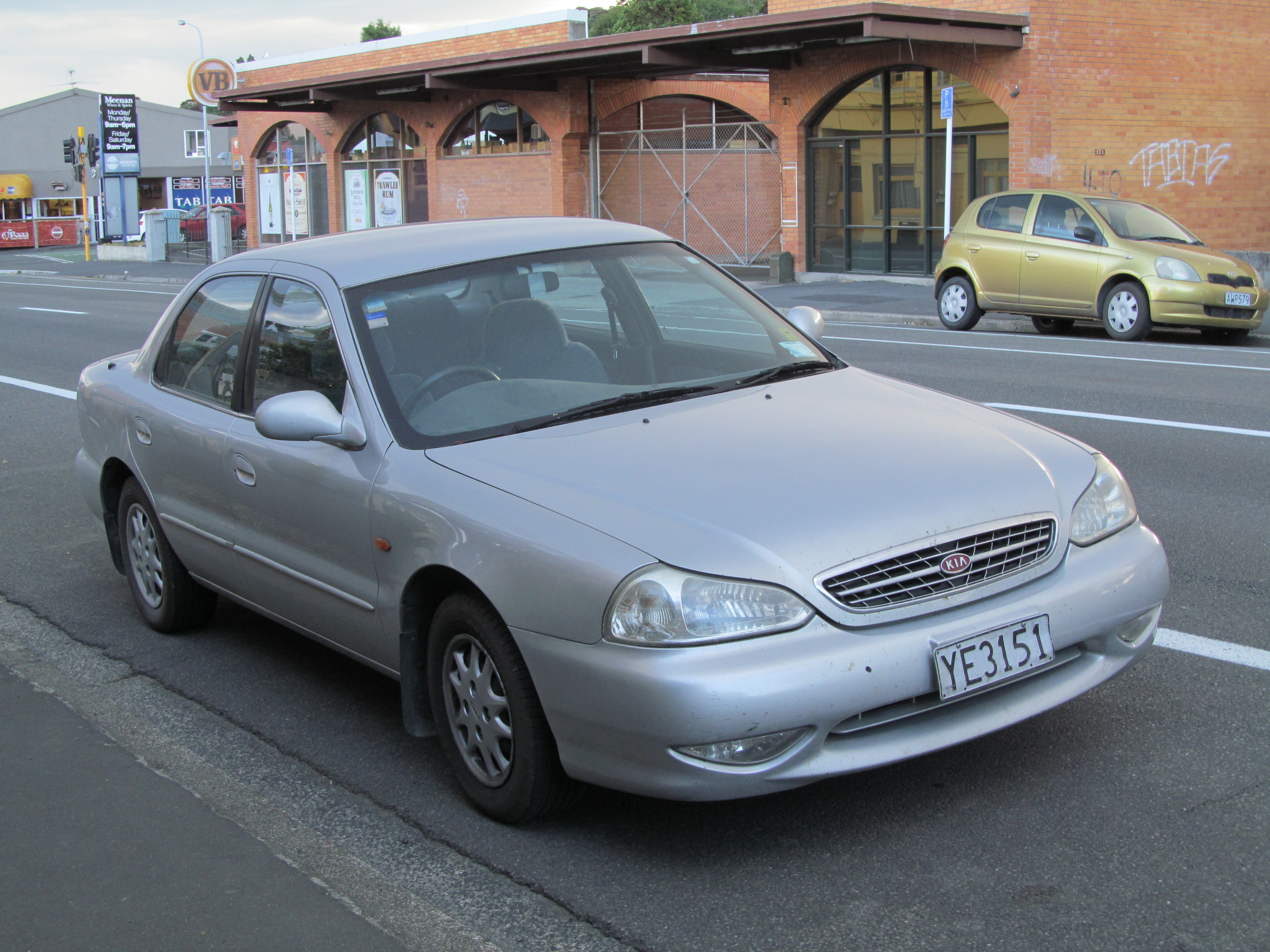
1999 Kia Credos (facelift, New Zealand)

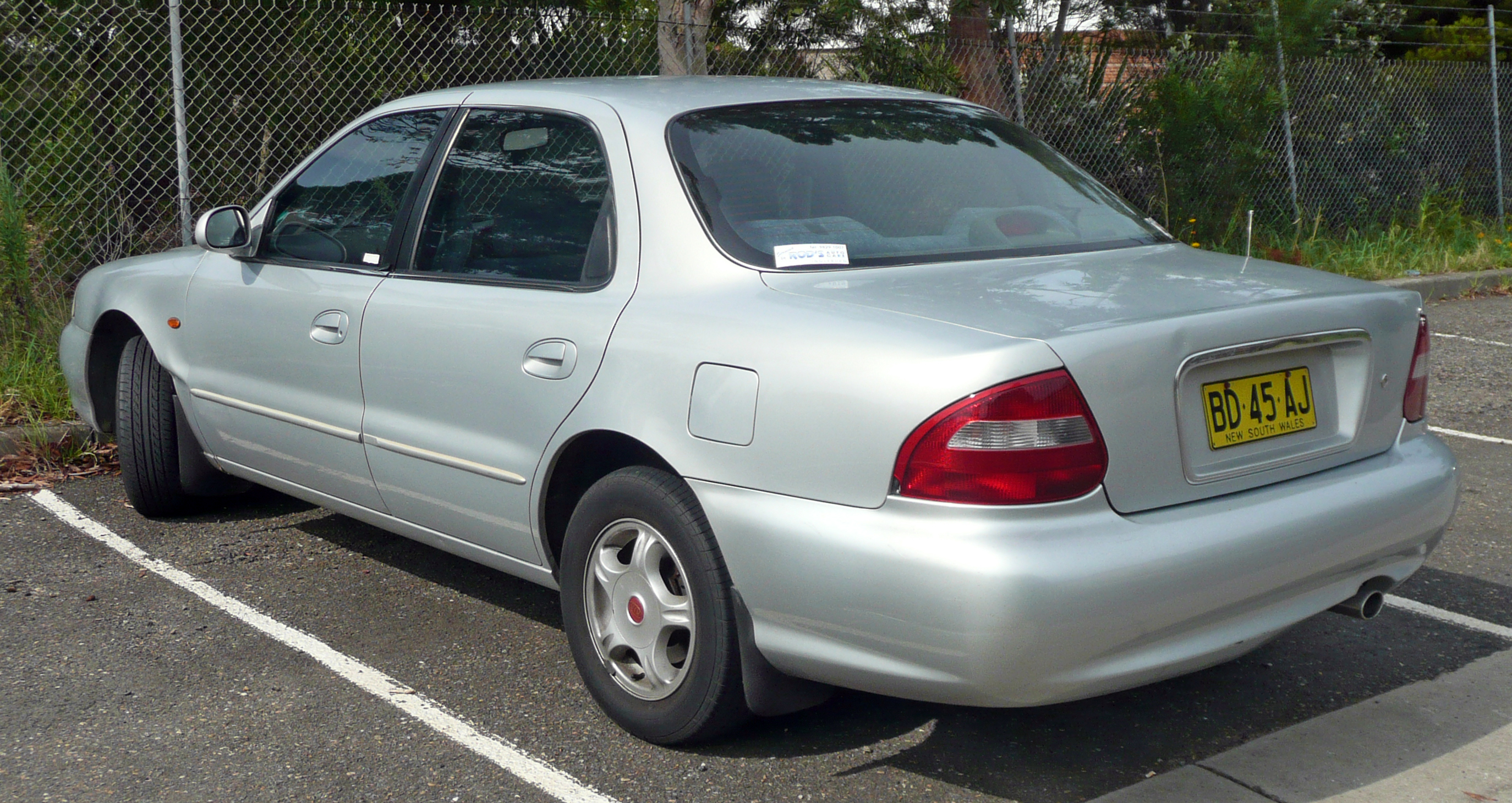
Kia Credos rear (facelift)

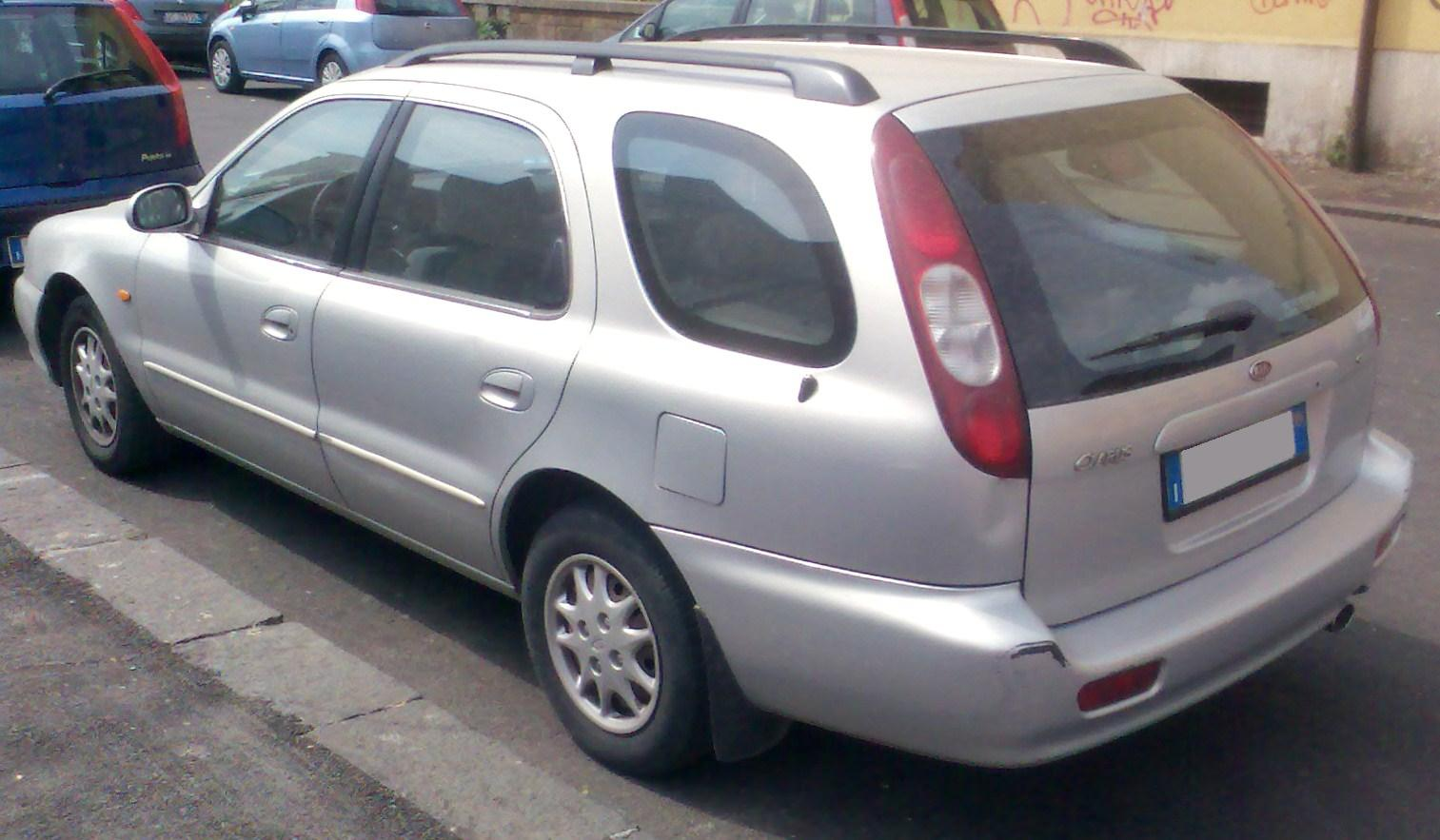
Kia Clarus Station Wagon rear (facelift)
