= Mazda MX-6 =

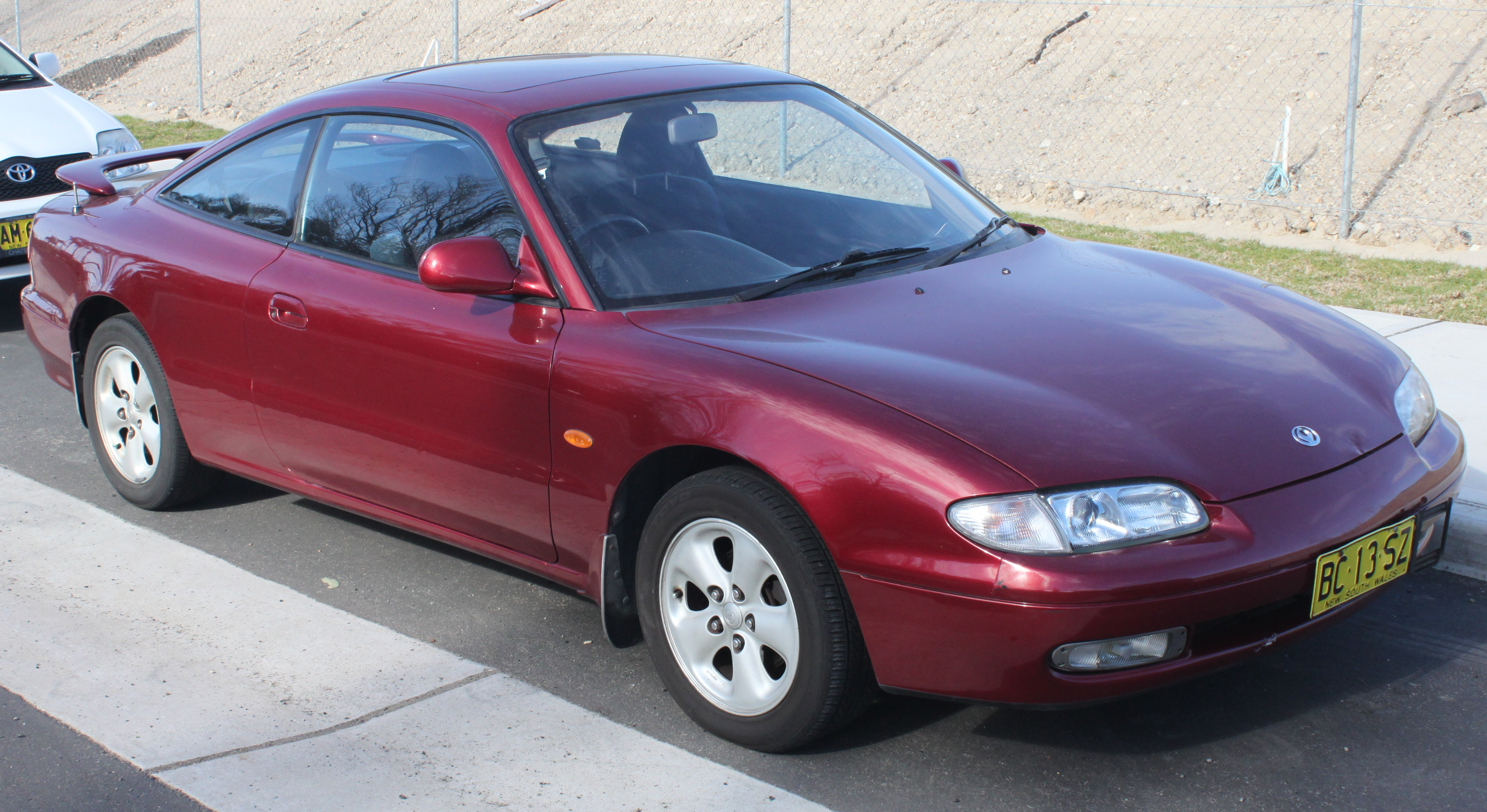

Overview
- Manufacturer: Mazda
- Production: 1987–1997
- Assembly: Japan: Hiroshima/Hofu; United States: Flat Rock, Michigan (AAI)

Body and chassis
- Class: Sport compact
- Body style: 2-door coupé
- Layout: Front-engine, front-wheel-drive
- Platform: Mazda G platform
- Related: Mazda Capella; Ford Probe

Chronology
- Predecessor: Mazda 626 coupé (GC)

The Mazda MX-6 is a front-engine, front-wheel-drive sport compact coupé manufactured and marketed by Mazda from 1987 to 1997 across two generations.

Mechanically identical to the Ford Probe, the Capella/626 and its hatchback platform mate, the Ford Telstar, these cars shared the GD (1988–1992) and GE (1993–1997) platforms. The MX-6 replaced the 626 Coupé, although it continued to share the same chassis.

The MX-6, 626, and Ford Probe were manufactured at joint-venture plants either by AutoAlliance in Flat Rock, Michigan, for the North American market, or in Japan for Asian and European markets.

== First generation (1987–1992) ==
First generation
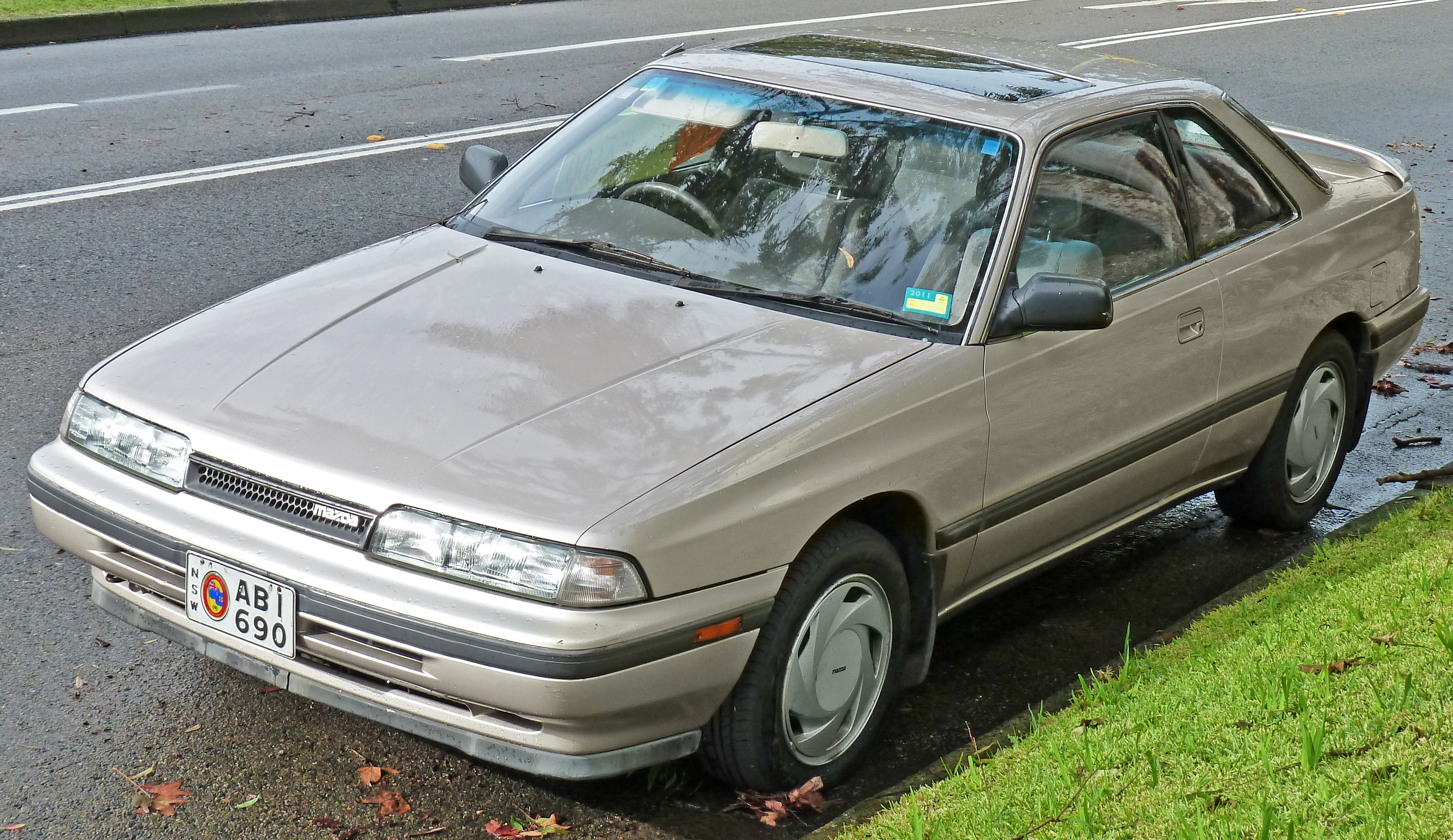

Overview
- Model code: GD
- Also called: Mazda 626 Coupé; Mazda Capella C2
- Production: 1987–1992
- Designer: Hiroshi Yamamoto (1985)

Body and chassis
- Related: Mazda Capella/626 (GD); Ford Probe

Powertrain
- Engine: 1789 cc F8 I4; 1789 cc F8 DOHC I4; 1998 cc FE I4; 1998 cc FE-DOHC DOHC I4; 2184 cc F2 I4; 2184 cc F2T turbo I4
- Transmission: 5-speed manual; 4-speed automatic

Dimensions
- Wheelbase: 2,515 mm (99.0 in)
- Length: 4,495 mm (177.0 in)
- Width: 1,690 mm (66.5 in)
- Height: 1,360 mm (53.5 in)

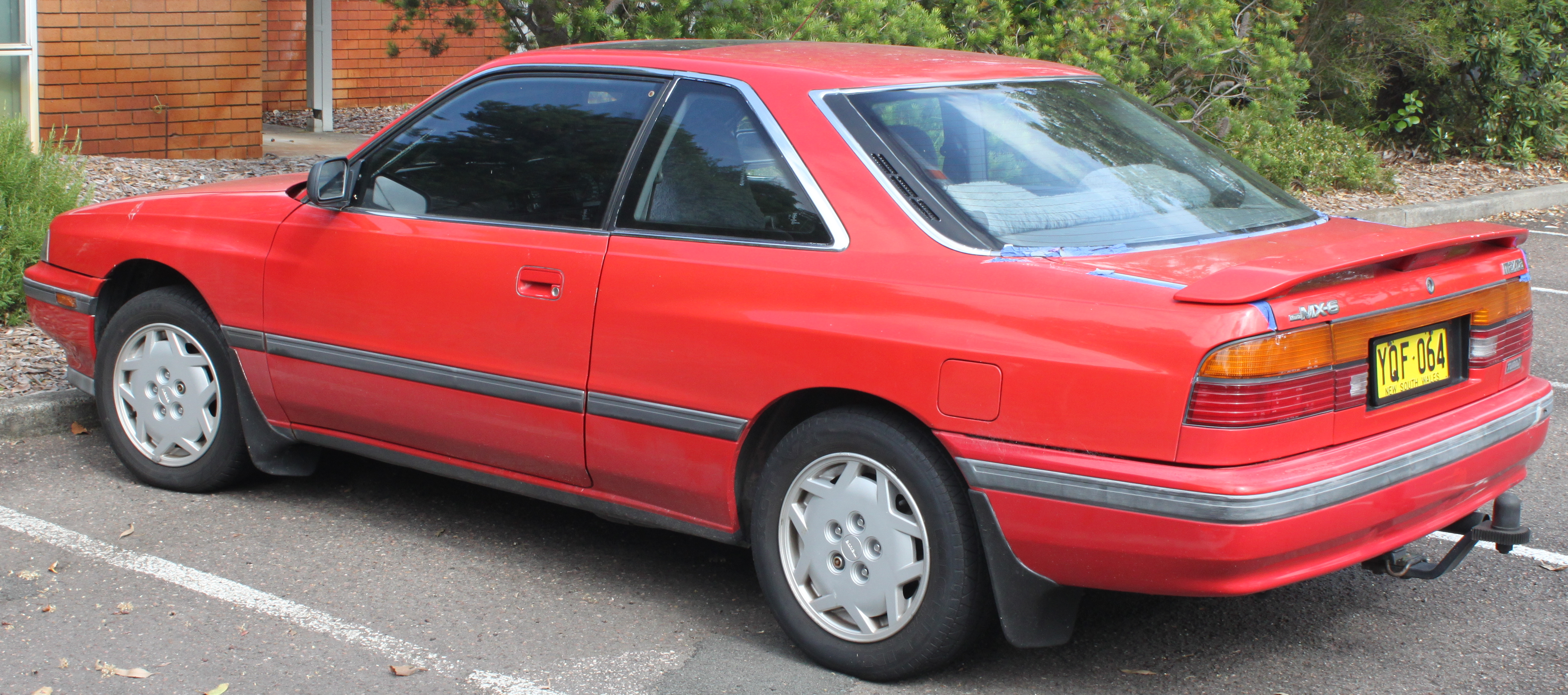
1988 Mazda MX-6 Turbo (Australia)

The first-generation MX-6 appeared in 1987 and lasted until 1992 in the United States. In some markets, the model years were from 1987 to 1991. It was based on a series of futuristic sports compact concept cars of the early 1980s. It was a large coupé, based on the Mazda GD platform, and was powered by the inline-four Mazda F engines. It used the Mazda G4A-EL four-speed electronic-shift automatic transmission.

The US market made use of the F2 2.2-liter engine, with the base engine producing 110 hp (82 kW). The turbocharged option produces 145 hp (108 kW). European and Japanese market versions were shipped with either the 1.8 L F8 or the 2.0 L FE or FE-DOHC DOHC engines.

The MX-6 was produced with two transmission options, a five-speed manual transmission or a four-speed automatic with overdrive.

This generation was available in several trim levels, which differed depending on the market in which the vehicle was sold. In the United States, the MX-6 was available in DX, LX, LE, and GT trim levels:

- DX was the "bare bones" model, offering the base 110 hp (82 kW) and 130 lb⋅ft (176 N⋅m) F2 2.2 L engine and few options, but most MX-6s sold in the US were equipped with air conditioning.
- LX added power windows, power locks, and power mirrors, as well as an optional electric moonroof.
- LE was a rare "Luxury or Leather Edition" model that was the same as the LX, but included leather seating surfaces and a leather-wrapped shift knob on manual transmission-equipped vehicles.
- GT included all options from the LX, but also stepped up to the F2T 2.2 L turbocharged, intercooled engine, which put out 145 hp (108 kW) and 190 lb⋅ft (258 N⋅m) of torque delivering a significant performance boost. It also had four-wheel disc brakes with ABS as optional, and three-way electronically adjustable suspension, dubbed AAS.

In 1989, Mazda offered a special four-wheel steering (commonly abbreviated 4WS) option on MX-6 GTs destined for the U.S. This system consisted of an electronically controlled rear steering rack that turned the rear wheels opposite to the fronts at low speeds to improve cornering, and turned the rear wheels with the fronts at high speeds to improve highway lane change maneuvering. This option was available through all years for GT models in other markets.

European specification vehicles shipped as the 626 Coupé and commonly received either the 1.8 L SOHC F8 or 2.0 L SOHC FE engine in GLX models, or the 2.0 L FE-DOHC engine in their GT models. 4WS was a common option for European 626 Coupés. Australian vehicles were almost always equipped with the 2.2 L turbocharged F2T engine as the US models, as well as 4WS. They also carried the MX-6 name of the American models.

Japanese specification vehicles were shipped as the Capella C2 and were available in several trims, most notably GT-R (FE-DOHC and 4WS), GT-X (FE-DOHC and AAS), or GT-S (F8 and 4WS or AAS). In other parts of East Asia, the MX-6 name was also used.

New Zealand received vehicles in either European or Australian specification, selectable on order. As such, New Zealand-market GTs can have either the F2T 2.2 L turbocharged engine or the FE-DOHC 2.0 L DOHC, with optional 4WS.

== Second generation (GE; 1991–1997) ==
Second generation
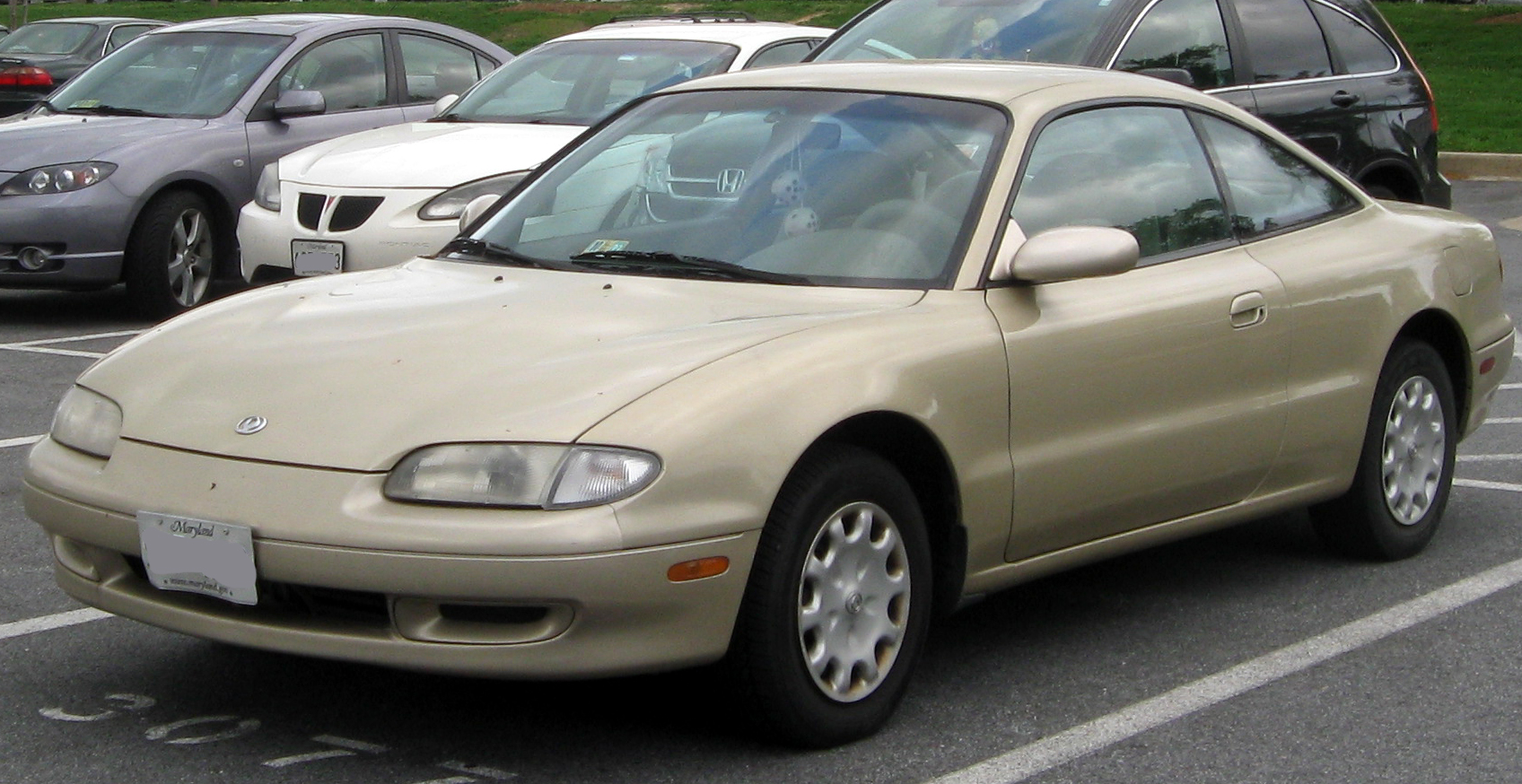

Overview
- Model code: GE
- Also called: Mazda MX-6 Mystère (Canada)
- Production: 1991–1997
- Designer: Yasuo Aoyagi (1989)

Body and chassis
- Related: Mazda 626/Cronos/ɛ̃fini MS-6 (GE); Mazda Xedos 6/Eunos 500; Ford Probe

Powertrain
- Engine: 2.0 L FS-DE I4; 2.0 L KF-ZE V6; 2.5L KL-DE/KL-ZE V6
- Transmission: 5-speed manual; 4-speed automatic

Dimensions
- Wheelbase: 102.8 in (2,611 mm)
- Length: 177.5 in (4,508 mm)
- Width: 68.9 in (1,750 mm)
- Height: 51.6 in (1,311 mm)
- Curb weight: 2,775 lb (1,259 kg)

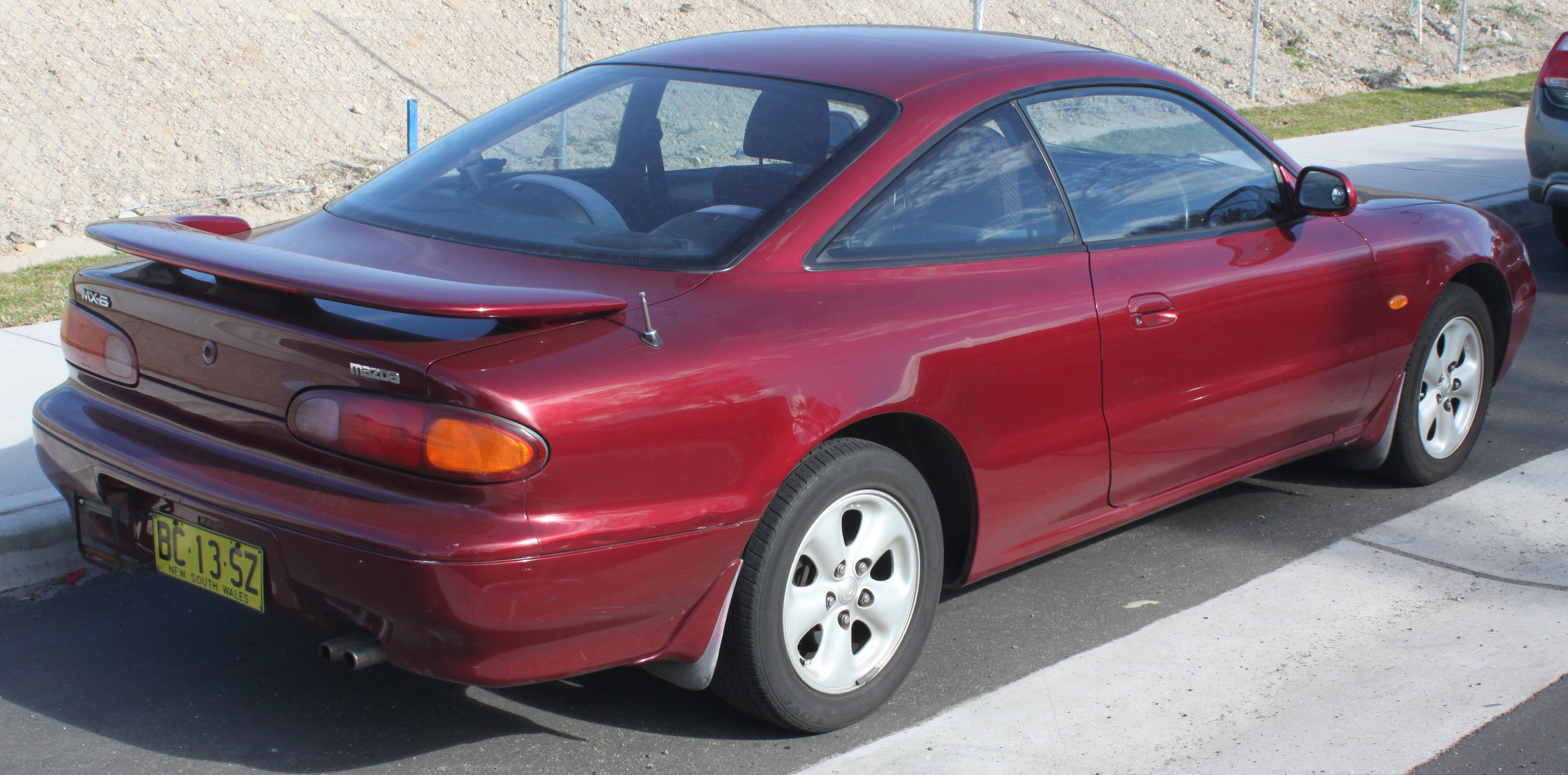
1992 Mazda MX-6 coupe (Australia)

Mazda launched the second generation MX-6 using the GE platform, shared by the 626 and Ford rebadged cars, the Ford Probe and the Ford Telstar.

It was released in three distinct variants worldwide, known as A-spec, E-spec, and J-spec, which relates to their destined markets – U.S., Europe, and Japan, respectively.

=== A-spec ===
The A-spec variant for the North American market was manufactured alongside the Ford Probe and Mazda 626 from 1992 as a 1993 model by AutoAlliance International in Flat Rock, Michigan. Three trim levels were available on the A-spec models:

- RS – Base model, fitted with the FS-DE 2.0 DOHC I4 engine, making 118 hp (88 kW).
- LS – Luxury model, fitted with the KL-DE 2.5 DOHC V6 engine, making 164 hp (122 kW). It was also equipped with alloy wheels, a low rear spoiler, an optional CD player, fog lights, and leather or cloth interior.
- LS M-edition – A special edition based on the LS, including different, all-red tail lights, chrome scuff plates, an in-dash three-disc CD changer, gold alloy wheels (same design as LS), all gold badges, and M-edition embroidered on the front seats and floor mats. M-editions only came in three paint colors: a trim exclusive burgundy, black, and white. All had cream leather interiors and special gold pinstriping. The A-spec models never received 4WS.

In 1995, the second generation MX-6 was refreshed with different five-spoke alloy wheels, and emissions changes. Another major change after 1995 was the addition of OBD-II to the car. With this addition, the 164 hp (122 kW) was decreased to 160 hp (120 kW) for every year thereafter. Known as the "GE2", this model ran until 1997. Unlike the first generation, the second-generation MX-6 only had one model with a different moniker – the Canadian MX-6 Mystère.

=== E-spec ===
Built from 1991 in Japan, for Australia, New Zealand, and Europe, compared to the A-spec, the E-spec has different headlights (a two-piece projector setup giving far greater lighting) and taillights, different front and rear bumpers, fog lights, wing-mirrors (power and heated), steering wheel, interior trim, and alloys as standard. The side indicator lights were mounted behind the front wheels, and no corner bumper lights were used. It also came with optional air conditioning and leather interior (standard from '96), and the MX-6's main act – the 4WS system (not available in the UK). The engine was the same as the U.S. version (although not limited by lower-octane fuels) – the KL-DE 2.5 DOHC V6 engine, making 165 PS (121 kW) and with the higher octane fuels used in Europe as standard, slightly lower mileage but with greater performance.

In Australia, the MX-6 was released in November 1991. Only one trim was available. Equipped with the KL-DE 2.5 DOHC V6 engine, sunroof, 4WS, etc., with the only remaining options being leather and electric seats. September 1994 was the release of the GE2 update model. Like Mazda Australia did with the GD2, now two choices were available – the 4WS, all-options MX-6, or the 2WS version. They both had new wheels, interior trim, and steering wheel, but only the 4WS version got the sunroof, CD player, leather (which actually only became standard in late '96), and the digital climate control. The MX-6 lasted until 1997, with the last few rolling out of dealers in 1998. The last one rolled off the assembly line on June 20, 1997.

=== J-spec ===
This version was also released in 1991, and is very similar to the E-spec (as they are built in the same place), but with minor changes. The version sold in Japan was exclusive to Japanese Mazda dealerships, and was not badge engineered and sold at other Mazda Japanese dealerships, unlike the MX-3, the MX-5, and the RX-7 coupes. One-piece headlights were fitted, with indicators incorporated in the fog light housing, as well as a different rear bumper with smaller registration plate cutout, similar to the A-spec. Almost everything was an option, but the 4WS was available, as well as the digital climate control, electric folding mirrors, larger centre console, and of course, the Mazdaspeed body add-ons – a subtle lip kit with Supra-style high-rise rear spoiler.

Engine choice was the KL-ZE 2.5 DOHC V6 making 200 PS (147 kW), a high-compression version of the KL-DE, or the KF-ZE 2.0 DOHC V6 making 160 PS (118 kW); all of the K-series engines in the MX-6 were based on the same engine block and included those found in the Ford Probe, Xedos 6, and MX-3 V6 models. The KLZE had about 40 more horsepower than the KLDE versions for a few reasons. Although the displacement was the same, the KLZE had more durations on the cams, higher compression due to a different shape of pistons, and the intake manifold was different on the ZE. The KL-ZE intake manifold runners were shorter and wider than the KL-DE manifold. Also, the heads on the KL-ZE were ported and shaped differently. Not only was the ZE higher in compression, but it was also a higher-revving engine. The only flaws in the KL-ZE design were the weaker valve springs on the intake valves. This is usually corrected by using the KL-DE springs, keepers, and retainers which are stronger.

Four-wheel steering was used from 1987 to 1998 on both MX-6 GT and GE models. Four-wheel steering (4WS) was available on both the first-generation and second-generation MX-6 models, although the North American market only received it for the 1989 GT model. South African MX-6s never received 4WS.

According to Mazda, the system provided:

- Superior cornering stability
- Improved steering responsiveness and precision
- High-speed straight-line stability
- Notable improvement in rapid lane-changing maneuvers
- Smaller turning radius and tight-space maneuverability at low vehicle speed range

The system electronically controlled a rear rack that was behind the rear wheels. At low speeds (up to 35 km/h), the rear wheels move in the opposite direction from the front wheels, aiding parking and U-turns by lowering the turning circle. Above these speeds, the rear wheels move in the same direction as the front, meaning control during high-speed maneuvers such as lane changes or cornering was improved. Either way, the turning angle of the rear wheels was slight at just 5°, a measurement Mazda determined to be optimally effective and natural to human sensitivity.

- When the engine is turned off, the rear wheels straighten up. They change back to the angle of the front wheels when the engine is restarted. This is caused by the 4WS control unit powering down, and the fail-safe system overriding the rear rack.
- If the system ever faults, as a fail-safe, the rear wheels lock straight to allow the vehicle normal 2WS functionality.

== Models ==
Year	Model	Engine	Power	Torque	0–60 mph (97 km/h)(s)	1/4 mi (0.4 km)	Top speed
1988–1992	DX, LX, LE	2.2 L (2184 cc) F2 I4	110 hp (82 kW)	130 lb⋅ft (176 N⋅m)	9.9	17.0 at 88 mph (142 km/h)	126 mph (202 km/h)
1988–1992	GT	2.2 L (2184 cc) F2T turbo I4	145 hp (108 kW)	190 lb⋅ft (258 N⋅m)	7.5	15.4 at 92 mph (148 km/h)	130 mph (209 km/h)
1993–1997	RS	2.0 L (1991 cc) FS I4	130 hp (97 kW)	127 lb⋅ft (172 N⋅m)			116 mph (187 km/h)
1993–1997	LS	2.5 L (2497 cc) KL-DE V6	164 hp (122 kW) at 5600 rpm	160 lb⋅ft (217 N⋅m) at 4500 rpm	8.5	15.7 at 92 mph (148 km/h)	138 mph (224 km/h)
1993–1997	LS	2.5 L (2497 cc) KL-ZE(J-Spec) V6	200 hp (149 kW) at 6500 rpm	165 lb⋅ft (224 N⋅m) at 5500 rpm	7.0	15.1 at 97 mph (156 km/h)	141 mph (227 km/h)

== Future ==
On 16 October 2018, Mazda filed a trademark application with the Japanese Patent Office for the Mazda MX-6 nameplate which can be used for "automobiles and parts and accessories thereof," hinting that the manufacturer may release a new generation MX-6 in the near future.
