= Kia Concord =

Four-door sedan

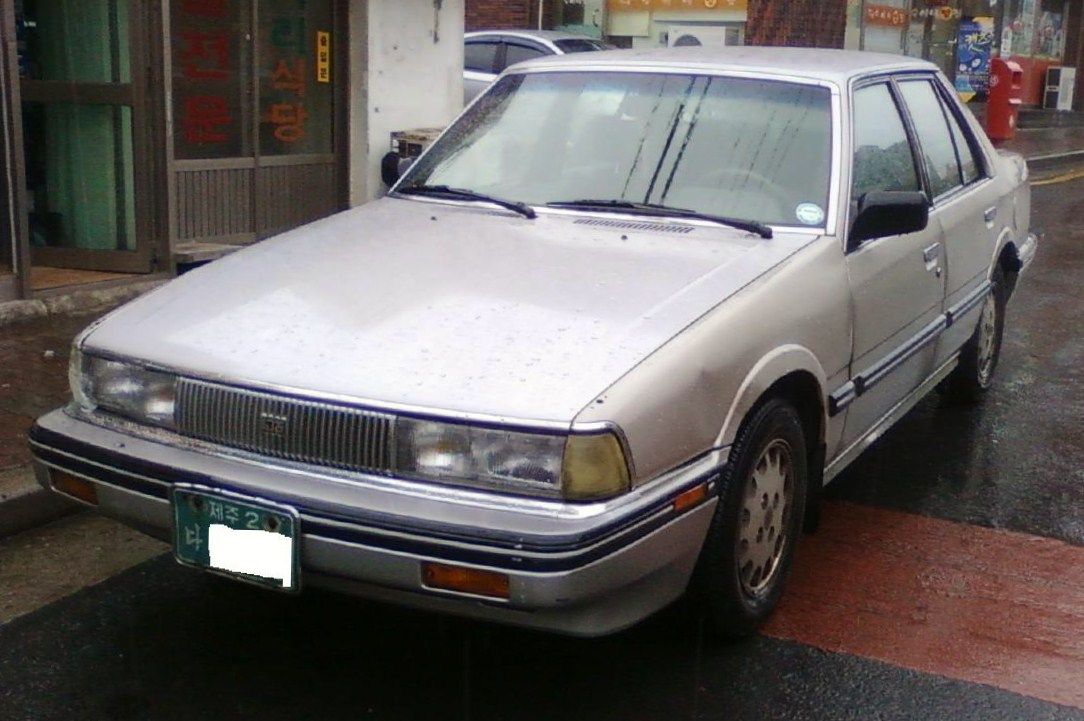

Overview
- Manufacturer: Kia Motors
- Also called: Kia Capital (SWB Version)
- Production: October 1987 – June 1995 (Concord); March 1989 – December 1996 (Capital)
- Assembly: South Korea: Hwasung Plant, Hwasung

Body and chassis
- Class: Compact Sedan (Capital); Mid-size Sedan (Concord)
- Layout: FR layout
- Doors: 4
- Related: Mazda Capella (GC)

Powertrain
- Engine: 1.5 L B5 I4 (Capital); 1.8 L F8 I4; 1.8 L F8 LPG I4; 2.0 L FE SOHC I4; 2.0 L FE DOHC I4; 2.0 L RF Diesel I4
- Transmission: 5-speed manual 3/4-speed automatic

Dimensions
- Wheelbase: 2,520 mm (99.2 in)
- Length: 4,550-4,570 mm (179.1-179.9 in) (Concord); 4,430-4,480 mm (174.4-176.3 in) (Capital)
- Width: 1,705-1,720 mm (67.1-67.7 in) (Concord); 1,705 (67.1 in) (Capital)
- Height: 1,405 mm (55.3 in)
- Curb weight: 1,140-1,180 kg (2,513-2,601 lb) (Concord); 990-1,100 kg (2,183-2,426 lb) (Capital)

Chronology
- Successor: Kia Credos (Concord); Kia Sephia (Capital)

The Kia Concord is a four-door sedan produced by South Korea's Kia from 1987. It is a license-built version of the 1982 Mazda Capella, and all versions accordingly used Mazda four-cylinder engines. The Capital/Concord lineup underwent a series of facelifts, eventually becoming the "New Capital" and "New Concord" in marketing material. Production of the Concord ended in 1995, while the cheaper Capital continued until late 1996. In 1996, Kia replaced the car with the Kia Credos, which they based on the Mazda GE Platform.

== History ==
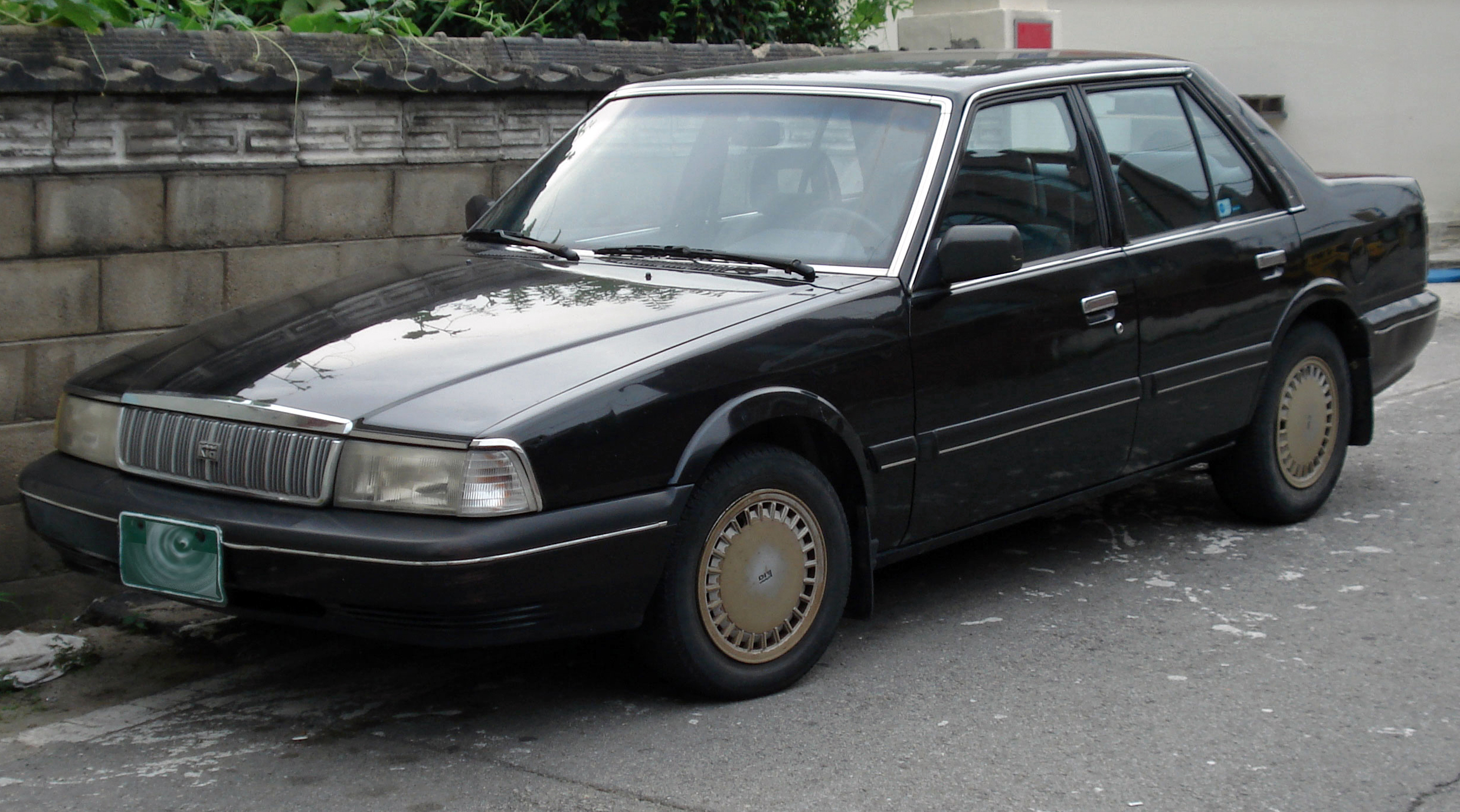
1991-1995 Kia New Concord 1.8i GTX

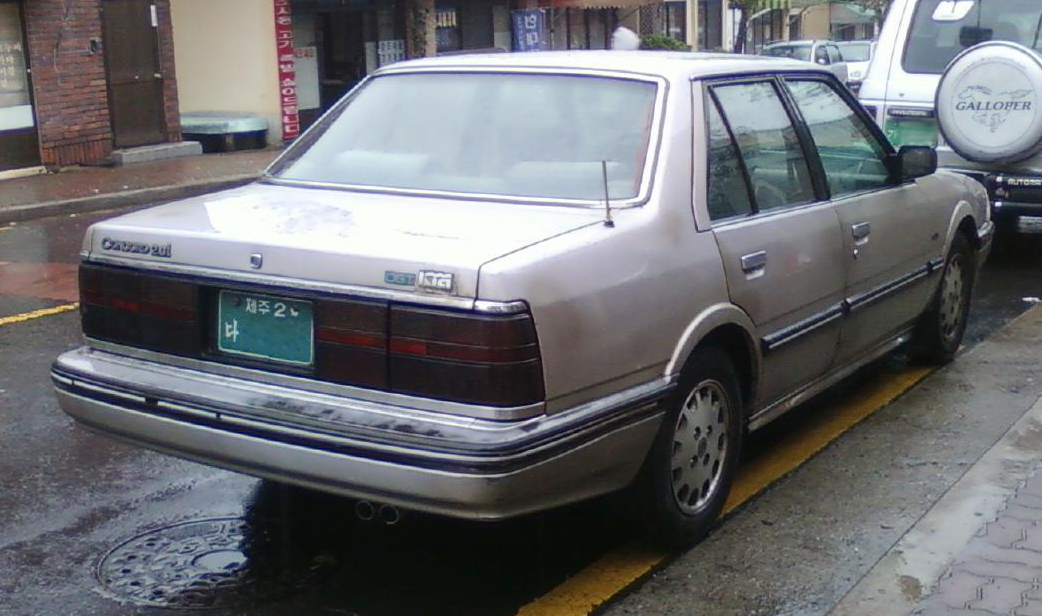
1989 Kia Concord 2.0i DGT rear

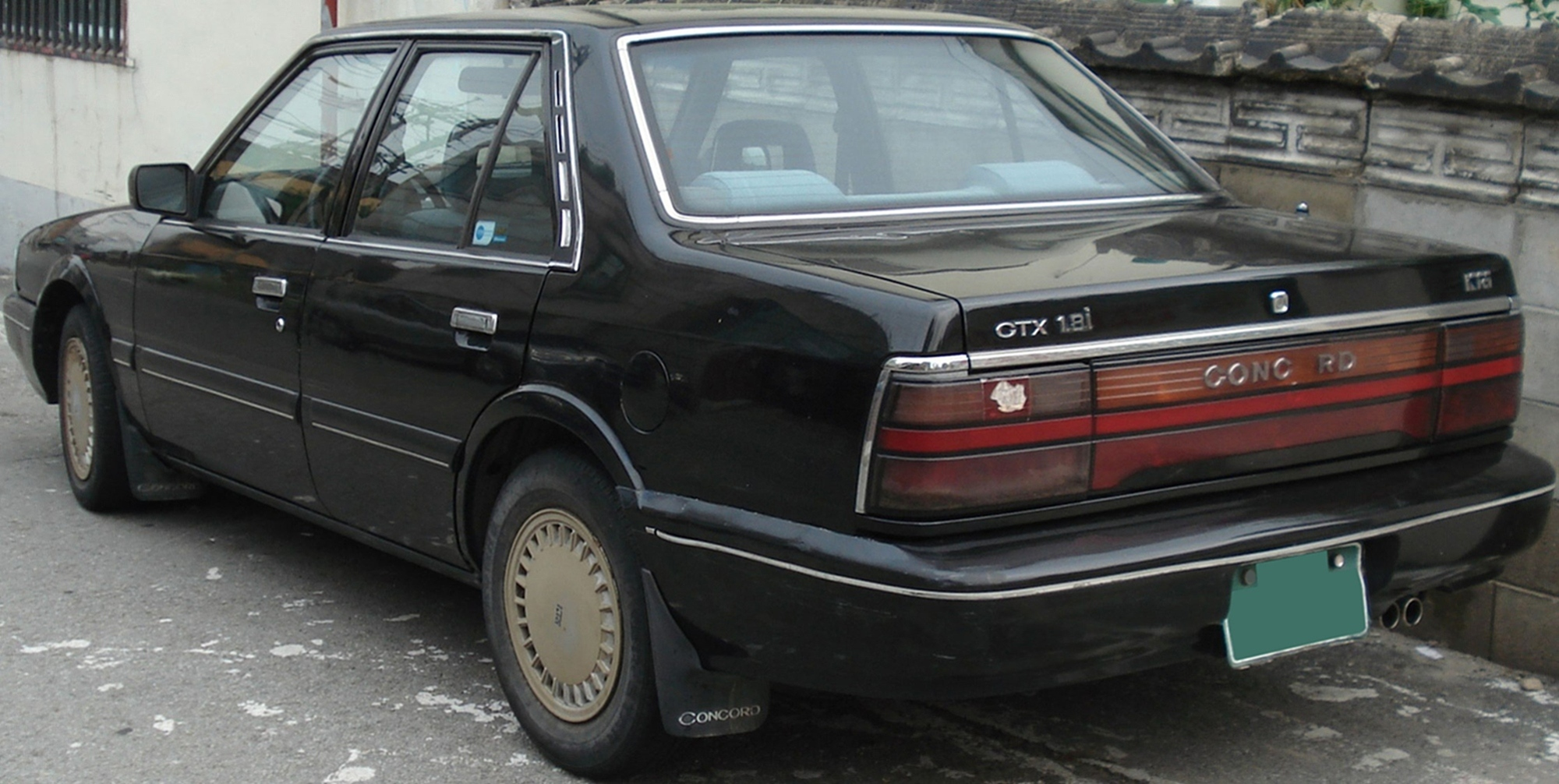
1991-1995 Kia New Concord 1.8i GTX rear

First introduced in April 1987, the Concord received the carburetted 99 PS (73 kW) 2-litre petrol FE engine. During 1988, the engine programme was expanded considerably, with the 72 PS (53 kW) 2-litre diesel "RF" added in April, a 95 PS (70 kW) 1.8-litre (F8) in May, a 110 PS (81 kW) fuel-injected version (called the 2.0i DGT) added in July, and finally an LPG powered 1.8 for taxi usage added in August. This expansion allowed the Concord to better compete with the Hyundai Sonata. The DGT's name was a reference to the digital dashboard with which it was fitted.

After the 1991 facelift the engine programme was somewhat restricted, but in March 1992 a comparatively powerful DOHC version of the 2.0 was added, with 139 PS (102 kW) at 6000 rpm.

With the 1995 introduction of the Kia Credos, production of the Concord came to an end. The smaller and simpler Capital continued a little while longer as a low-priced alternative.

== Kia Capital ==
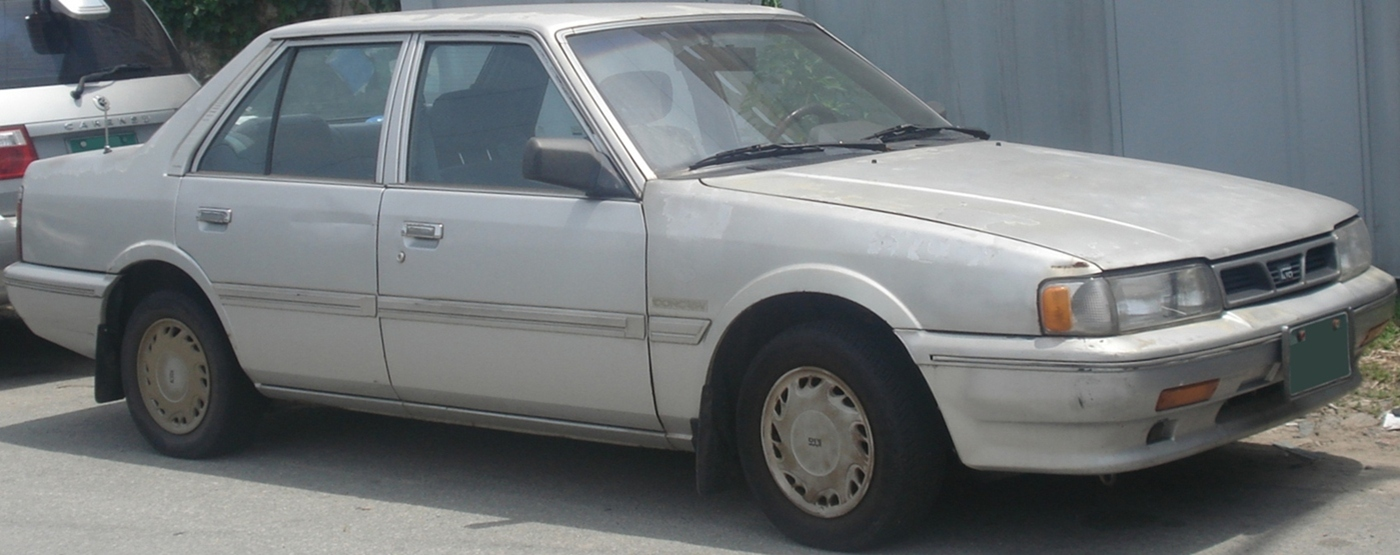
Pre-facelift Kia Capital DOHC 16V

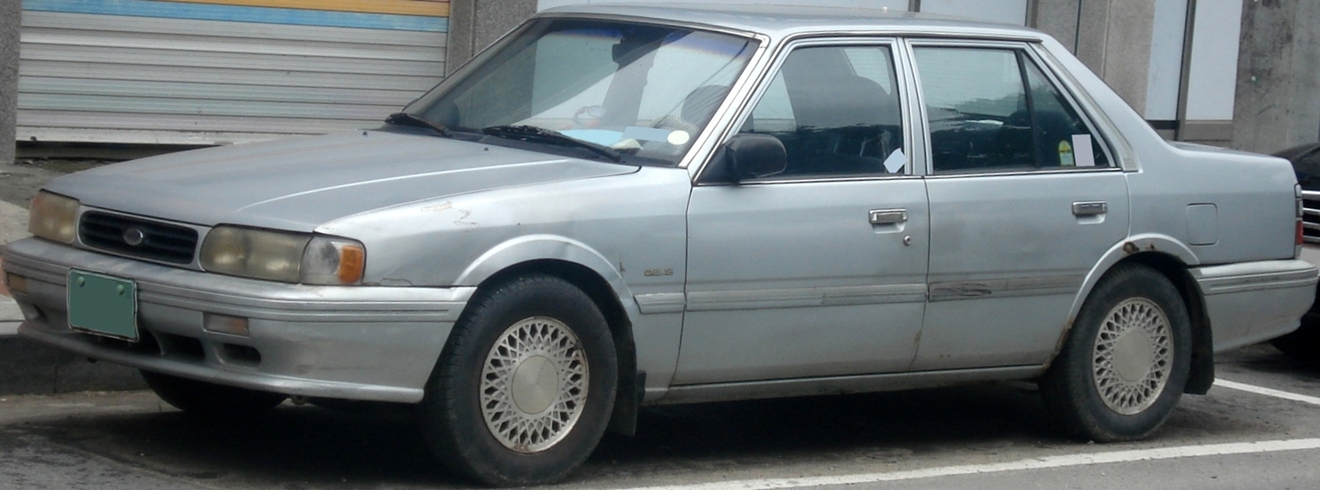
Kia "New Capital" LS Di

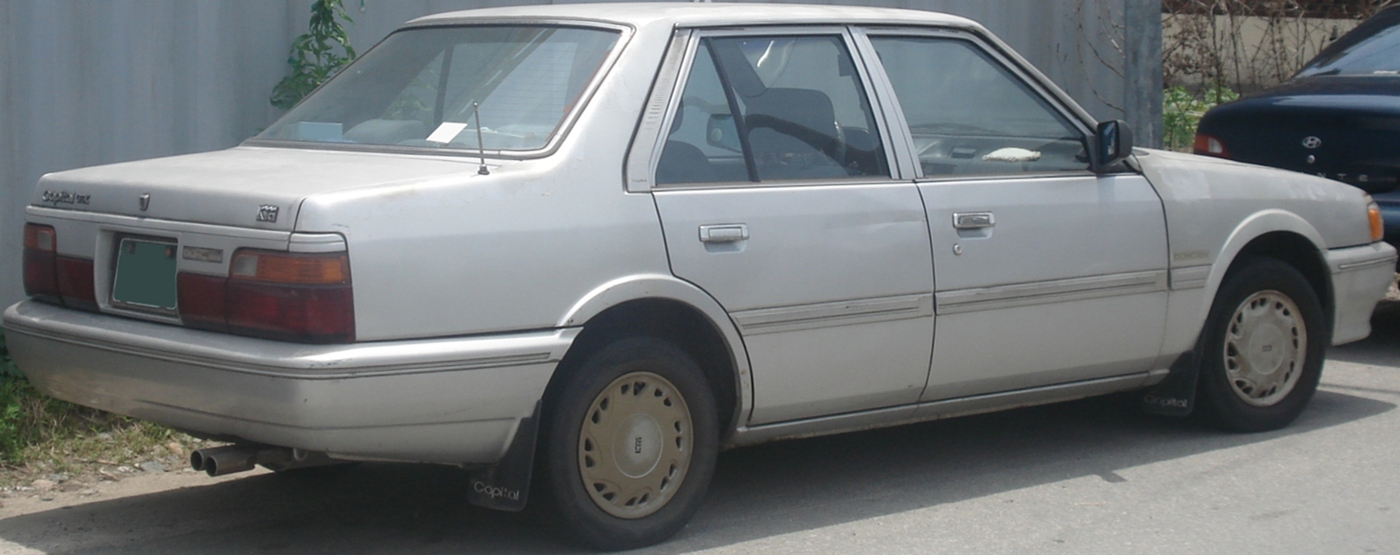
Pre-facelift Kia Capital DOHC 16V

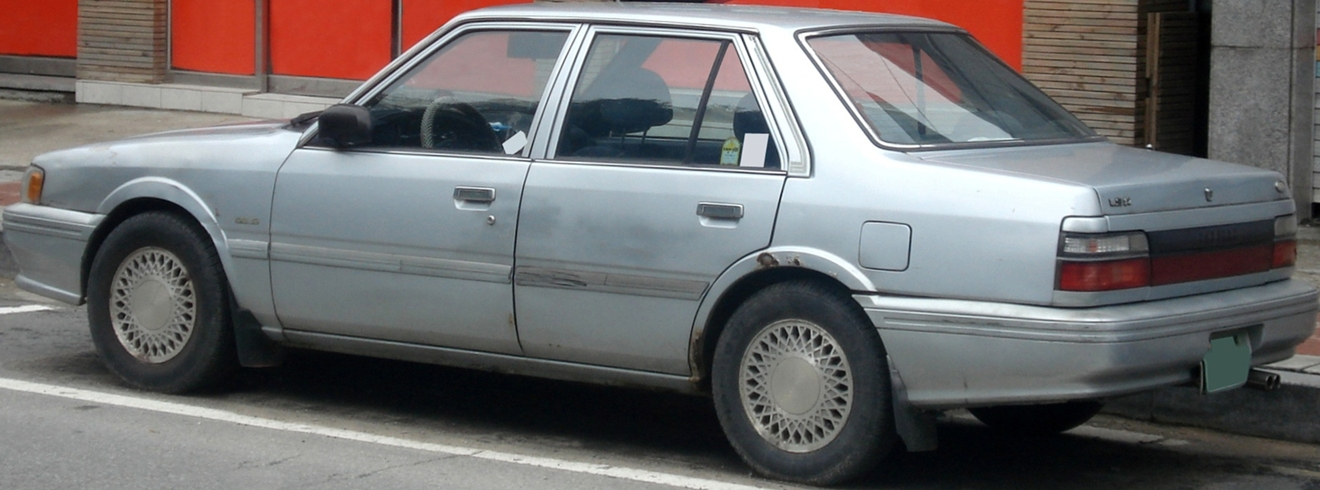
Kia "New Capital" LS Di

The lower end Capital (K930-series) was added in February 1989 with a carburetted two-valve SOHC version of the Mazda 1.5-litre B5 engine. Power was 80 PS (59 kW) at 6000 rpm. There was also a 1.5 MPFi version with a claimed 95 PS (70 kW), the same output as that of the fuel-injected 1.8-litre GLX version available until the facelift.

After a change in legislation meaning that cars were now taxed based on displacement, with a major threshold at 1.5 litres, the Capital was available with a Twin Cam, 16-valve B5 engine in May 1990. This surprising development had 115 PS (85 kW) on tap at 6,500 rpm. Top speed was 170 km/h (106 mph), the same as for the fuel-injected 1.5, but 0–100 km/h acceleration time dropped from 13.5 to 10.0 seconds. After the 1990 introductions of stronger competitors such as the Daewoo Espero and Hyundai Elantra, the Capital received a facelift in November 1991. The facelift was not very deep, the most obvious difference being the relocation of the rear license plate to the bumper rather than between the taillights. The facelift version offered the 1.5 engine as well as a downgraded version of the 1.8, now to carburetted specifications and producing a mere 82 PS (60 kW) at 5000 rpm. This was mainly intended for taxi usage. There was also an export version with the carburetted two-valve 1.5 for Kia's very few export markets, with 73 PS (54 kW).

In June 1994 the Capital received another facelift, featuring more rounded headlights and a new grille with new Kia logo, replacing the old one with chimney-based design. This was called the "New Capital" in the marketing, although the badging on the car remained plain "Capital". The New Capital was only sold with the 16-valve B5 engine, in GS or higher LS equipment levels. Production of the Capital finally ended in December 1996, overlapping a few years with the Sephia that would eventually replace it.

Kia continued its line of mid-size sedans with Credos (1995), Optima (2000), Lotze (2005) and K5 (2010).
