= Mazda F engine =

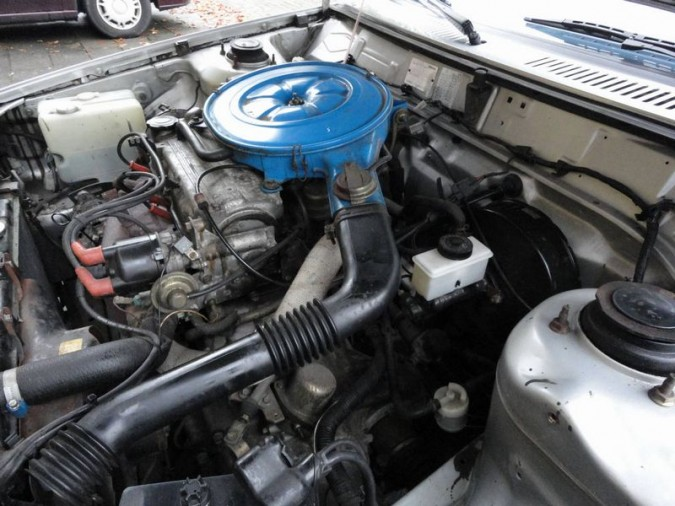
- Carburetted 8-valve FE engine in a 1983 626 GC

Overview
- Manufacturer: Mazda
- Production: 1977–2002

Layout
- Configuration: Inline-4
- Displacement: 1.8 L (1,769 cc); 1.8 L (1,789 cc); 1.8 L (1,839 cc); 2.0 L (1,970 cc); 2.0 L (1,991 cc); 2.0 L (1,998 cc); 2.2 L (2,184 cc)
- Cylinder bore: 80 mm (3.15 in); 81 mm (3.19 in); 83 mm (3.27 in); 86 mm (3.39 in)
- Piston stroke: 77 mm (3.03 in); 85 mm (3.35 in); 86 mm (3.39 in); 88 mm (3.46 in); 92 mm (3.62 in); 98 mm (3.86 in)
- Cylinder block material: Cast iron
- Cylinder head material: Alloy
- Valvetrain: SOHC 2 & 3 valves x cyl. DOHC 4 valves x cyl.
- Compression ratio: 7.8:1, 8.6:1, 9.1:1, 9.2:1, 9.7:1, 10.0:1

Combustion
- Turbocharger: IHI RHB5 VJ11 with air-to-air intercooler (some versions)
- Fuel system: Carburetor, Fuel injection
- Fuel type: Gasoline
- Cooling system: Water cooled

Output
- Power output: 73–170 PS (54–125 kW; 72–168 hp)
- Torque output: 89–190 lb⋅ft (121–258 N⋅m)

The F engine family from Mazda is a mid-sized inline-four piston engine with iron block, alloy head and belt-driven SOHC and DOHC configurations. Introduced in 1983 as the 1.6-litre F6, this engine was found in the Mazda B-Series truck and Mazda G platform models such as Mazda 626/Capella as well as many other models internationally including Mazda Bongo and Ford Freda clone, Mazda B-series based Ford Courier, Mazda 929 HC and the GD platform-based Ford Probe

There were four basic head types within the F range, the diesel SOHC 8-valve (R-series), the petrol SOHC 8-valve, petrol SOHC 12-valve, and the petrol DOHC 16-valve. These heads came attached to multiple variations of the different blocks and strokes. Only the petrol 8-valve and 12-valve shared the same gasket pattern. It was built at the Miyoshi Plant in Miyoshi, Hiroshima, Japan.

== Predecessors (VC/MA/F) ==
These engines are only the predecessors to the F-series engines, in no other way related. They were fitted to rear-wheel drive models in a longitudinal arrangement. This is in contrast to the successor engines that were designed for transverse front-wheel drive applications as had become the trend in the late 1970s and early 1980s.

=== VC ===
The VC is a 1.8 L (1,769 cc) overhead camshaft inline-four, with a bore and a stroke of 80 mm × 88 mm (3.15 in × 3.46 in). It was all new in 1975 (pre-1975 1.8 Couriers got the earlier, long-stroke VB engine) and has an alloy eight-valve head on an iron block. Output varied considerably depending on market and installation, in a 1981 UK-market B1800 it is 84 hp (63 kW; 85 PS) DIN at 5000 rpm and 13.7 kg⋅m (134 N⋅m; 99 lb⋅ft) at 2500 rpm.

Applications:

- 1975–1978 Mazda Luce / 929
- 1975–1977 Mazda Cosmo / 121
- 1977–1981 Mazda Luce / 929
- 1977–1984 Mazda B1800/Proceed PE2V
- 1978–1982 Mazda Capella/626
- 1975–1978 Ford Courier
- 1978–1983 Mazda Bongo
- 1974–1977 Mazda Parkway

=== MA/F ===
The 2.0 L (1,970 cc) was designated MA. Bore was as for the VC, 80 mm (3.15 in), but stroke was increased to 98 mm (3.86 in). This SOHC engine with a 2–barrel carburettor produced 89 hp (66 kW; 90 PS) and 109 lb⋅ft (148 N⋅m). A more fuel-efficient 1–barrel version produced 77 hp (57 kW; 78 PS). Later on, this engine was designated the F.

Applications:

- 1981–1982 Mazda Luce/Mazda Cosmo
- 1975–1980 Mazda Luce/929
- 1979–1988 Mazda 929 Wagon
- 1979–1982 Mazda Capella/626
- 1977–1985 Mazda B2000 (Officially, there was no 1985 year model for the B-Series in the USA. They skipped to 1986 for this line of vehicles for that market.)
- 1977–1985 Ford Courier (The Ford Courier was canceled in the US in 1982 to make room for the Ford Ranger the following year.)

== F6 ==
The smallest of the F-family engines is the F6 8-valve SOHC engine. Essentially a de-bored and de-stroked version of the base FE 2.0 with a bore and stroke of 81 mm × 77 mm (3.19 in × 3.03 in). At a compression ratio of 8.6:1, output is 73 hp (54 kW; 74 PS) at 5500 rpm and 89 lb⋅ft (121 N⋅m) at 3500 rpm. It replaced the F/NA 1.6 from the previous generation.

Applications:

- 1983–1987 Mazda Capella/626
- 1983–1985 Mazda B1600

== F8 ==
A destroked FE at 77 mm (3.03 in), the 1.8 L (1,789 cc) F8 comes in several configurations including a 12-valve head and fuel injection later in its life. It has a very high rod/stroke ratio of 2:1, bore and a stroke of 86 mm × 77 mm (3.39 in × 3.03 in). With a compression ratio of 8.6:1, power output is 80 hp (60 kW; 81 PS) at 5500 rpm and 98 lb⋅ft (133 N⋅m) at 2500 for the 8-valve SOHC carburetted versions.

Applications:

- 1983–1991 Mazda Capella/626
- 1988–1992 Mazda Persona/Eunos 300
- 1984–2005 Mazda Bongo/Ford Econovan
- 1989–1994 Kia Capital
- 1988–1991 Kia Concord
- 1993–1999 Asia Rocsta

=== F8-DOHC ===
The F8-DOHC is a DOHC F8 and basically a de-stroked version of the FE-DOHC displacing 1.8 L (1,789 cc). It uses the same exhaust cam, but a different intake cam with less lift and a long, single-runner intake manifold. The F8 is usually identified by its unpainted cam cover. Output was 115 PS (85 kW; 113 hp) at 6000 rpm and 115 lb⋅ft (156 N⋅m) at 5000 rpm. It is usually found in wagon variants.

Applications:

- 1988–1996 Mazda Capella/626
- 1990–1992 Mazda Persona/Eunos 300

== FE ==
The 2.0 L (1,998 cc) FE has a square 86 mm (3.39 in) bore and stroke. It was available as an 8-valve SOHC and 12-valve SOHC. Outputs are 82 PS (60 kW; 81 hp) at 5000 rpm and 152 N⋅m (112 lb⋅ft) at 2500 rpm for the 8-valve carburetor version, or 120 PS (88 kW; 118 hp) at 5300 rpm and 178 N⋅m (131 lb⋅ft) at 3700 rpm with fuel injection, 12-valve SOHC and a higher compression ratio (10.0:1 vs 8.6:1).

Applications:

- 1983–1991 Mazda Capella/626
- 1982–1987 Ford Telstar
- 1985–1987 Mazda B-Series
- 1985–1999 Mazda E-series
- 1981–1990 Mazda 929
- 1987–1995 Kia Concord

=== FET ===
The 2.0 L (1,998 cc) fuel-injected, turbocharged FET version of the FE produced 135 hp (101 kW; 137 PS) at 5250 rpm and 175 lb⋅ft (237 N⋅m) at 2800 rpm. It was a variant of the 8-valve SOHC FE Featuring a small turbocharger and no intercooler producing 7 psi (0.48 bar) of boost. As such it features the same 86 mm (3.39 in) bore and stroke of the FE. The Japanese variant of this engine was dubbed the Magnum Turbo and produces 145 PS (107 kW; 143 hp). Given that the peak power for the naturally aspirated, fuel-injected FE is 118 hp (88 kW; 120 PS), the rated power for the FET is said to be conservative.

Applications:

- 1986–1987 Mazda Capella/626
- 1986–1987 Ford Telstar Turbo
- 1986–1987 Mazda 929 coupe

=== FE-DOHC ===
Mazda FE-DOHC

Overview
- Manufacturer: Mazda
- Also called: FE-DE, FE-ZE and FE3

Layout
- Configuration: Inline-four
- Displacement: 1998 cc
- Cylinder bore: 86 mm
- Piston stroke: 86 mm
- Cylinder block material: Cast iron
- Cylinder head material: Aluminium
- Valvetrain: DOHC 16-valve
- Compression ratio: 8.8:1, 9.2:1, 9.5:1, 10:1, 10.5:1

Combustion
- Fuel system: EFI
- Fuel type: Petrol
- Cooling system: Water

Output
- Power output: 132–165 PS (97–121 kW; 130–163 hp)
- Specific power: 54kW/L
- Torque output: 133 lb⋅ft (180 N⋅m), 150 lb⋅ft (200 N⋅m)

Chronology
- Predecessor: Mazda FE
- Successor: Mazda FS, Mazda L-engine, MZR

The FE-DOHC is the 16 valve DOHC variant of the FE. The official Mazda engine codes of newer iterations are FE-DE and FE-ZE, depending on output level. Commonly called the FE3 which is also stamped into its head castings. The FE-DOHC shares the same dimensions as the original FE-SOHC, including the square 86 mm (3.39 in) bore x stroke and it has a 1.74 rod/stroke ratio. The FE-DOHC is usually identified by a gold-coloured cam cover, however not always. There were at least five different FE-DOHC engines available with various compression ratio, camshaft and ECU tuning combinations, however none were fitted with a turbocharger from the factory. In European 10.0:1 compression, non-catalytic trim, the FE-DOHC produces 148 PS (109 kW) at 6000 rpm and 133 lb⋅ft (180 N⋅m) at 4000 rpm. The 9.2:1 compression, catalytic converter version produces 140 ps. The Japanese domestic market variants produce anywhere between 145 ps and 165 ps. The only vehicle with 165ps was the 96–97 Capellas Wagons, FX (MT or AT) or FX Cruising (Only exists in AT). These received different tail lights to the earlier wagons.

The FE-DOHC was a European and Japanese market engine only (excluding use by Kia), and as such was only ever delivered in vehicles by Mazda to countries in those markets, with the exception of New Zealand who also received European market models. The engine was first fitted to the GD model 1988–1992 626 GT, 1987–1991 Capella, and the 626 Coupé GT 2.0i/Capella C2 GT-X and GT-R. In South Africa, Samcor – who built Mazdas under licence – also fitted the FE-DOHC engine to the Mazda 323 from 1991 to 1994.

Alongside the sedan, hatch and coupé models the FE-DOHC was also being used in the GV wagon, which ran until 1997. The rest of the world mainly received the FE-DOHC in the 1995–2003 Kia Sportage, built by Kia under license. Kia first introduced the engine in March 1992, when they installed it in the Kia Concord, a license built version of the 1982 Mazda Capella. The Sportage variant was reconfigured for rear-wheel drive configuration with long single-runner intake manifold, low-duration cams and exclusively in the low compression ratio of 9.2:1.

Applications:

- 1988–1997 Mazda Capella/626
- 1991–1993 323 200i (South Africa)
- 1992–1993 Ford Laser 2.0iRS and Meteor 2.0 16v (South Africa)
- 1995–2003 Kia Sportage
- 1992–1995 Kia Concord

Capella Cargo variants

1.8 Cargo SV	08.1992 – 09.1994	18114	FF	MT	G	1.8	F8	115	E-GV8W
1.8 Cargo SV	08.1992 – 09.1994	19147	FF	AT	G	1.8	F8	115	E-GV8W
1.8 Cargo SX	08.1992 – 09.1994	21379	FF	MT	G	1.8	F8	115	E-GV8W
1.8 Cargo SX	08.1992 – 09.1994	22412	FF	AT	G	1.8	F8	115	E-GV8W
1.8 Wagon SV	10.1994 – 06.1996	18936	FF	MT	G	1.8	F8	115	E-GV8W
1.8 Wagon SV	10.1994 – 06.1996	19969	FF	AT	G	1.8	F8	115	E-GV8W
1.8 Wagon SV	07.1996 – 10.1997	18936	FF	MT	G	1.8	F8-DE	115	E-GV8W
1.8 Wagon SV	07.1996 – 10.1997	19969	FF	AT	G	1.8	F8-DE	115	E-GV8W
1.8 Wagon SV-F	07.1996 – 10.1997	21890	FF	AT	G	1.8	F8-DE	115	E-GV8W
1.8 Wagon SX	10.1994 – 06.1996	22190	FF	AT	G	1.8	F8	115	E-GV8W
1.8 Wagon SX	07.1996 – 10.1997	22190	FF	AT	G	1.8	F8-DE	115	E-GV8W
2.0 Cargo GT	10.1990 – 07.1992	22812	4WD	MT	G	2.0	FE	150	E-GVER
2.0 Cargo GT	10.1990 – 07.1992	23845	4WD	AT	G	2.0	FE	145	E-GVER
2.0 Cargo GT	08.1992 – 09.1994	25299	4WD	MT	G	2.0	FE	150	Y-GVER
2.0 Cargo GT	08.1992 – 09.1994	26332	4WD	AT	G	2.0	FE	145	Y-GVER
2.0 Wagon FX	10.1994 – 06.1996	25610	4WD	MT	G	2.0	FE	150	E-GVER
2.0 Wagon FX	10.1994 – 06.1996	26643	4WD	AT	G	2.0	FE	145	E-GVER
2.0 Wagon FX	07.1996 – 10.1997	26599	4WD	MT	G	2.0	FE-ZE	165	E-GVER
2.0 Wagon FX	07.1996 – 10.1997	27632	4WD	AT	G	2.0	FE-ZE	165	E-GVER
2.0 Wagon FX cruising	07.1996 – 10.1997	28076	4WD	AT	G	2.0	FE-ZE	165	E-GVER
2.0 Wagon SV	10.1994 – 06.1996	24411	4WD	AT	G	2.0	FE	145	E-GVER
2.0 Wagon SV	07.1996 – 10.1997	21079	FF	AT	G	2.0	FE-DE	145	E-GVEW
2.0 Wagon SV	07.1996 – 10.1997	24600	4WD	AT	G	2.0	FE-DE	145	E-GVER
2.0 Wagon SX cruising	07.1996 – 10.1997	24944	FF	AT	G	2.0	FE-DE	145	E-GVEW

==== Design ====
The Mazda FE-DOHC uses a wide-angle, DOHC, belt-driven valvetrain configuration with flat-tappet 33 mm HLA bucket lifters. It is a non interference design. There are two valve springs per valve and four valves per cylinder. While a dual valve spring configuration is used, the stock springs are fairly low-sprung. Low spring rates were chosen for fuel efficiency and increased valvetrain longevity, and low friction with the dual valve springs for the reduction of harmonics and increased valve stability.

The head gasket used on the Kia version can be sourced in North America, but the builder must note that the coolant passage holes are configured for a RWD cooling system. Attempting to use the RWD head gasket in FWD cooling configuration will result in improper flow and can result in overheating of cylinder #4. Like many DOHC engines, this engine has an interference valvetrain design, making periodic timing belt changes vital to the engine's life. Should the timing belt break the engine should be replaced as piston and valvetrain damage will occur.

The Mazda FE-DOHC came with several different camshaft profiles from the factory. As such there were several camshaft combinations available.

Camshaft	Lift (mm)	Duration (deg)
FE5A	8.855	250°
FE3N	8.852	245°
FEAP	8.650	230
KO13	?	?
F8K1	6.800	225

The F8K1 was the intake camshaft for the F8-DOHC, only listed due to family ties.

The combinations available:

Intake	Exhaust
FE5A	FE5A
FE3N	FE3N
FEAP	FE3N
FE3N	KO13
F8K1	FE3N

VICS

The FE-DOHC featured Mazda's VICS system, short for Variable Inertia Control System, a variable intake setup to optimize runner length and resonance at different engine speeds. Much like Toyota's Acoustic Control Induction System, it had two sets of intake runners, a long set for low-medium RPMs, and a short set for high RPMs. It was operated by a vacuum solenoid based on the engine's current speed, actuating a pair of butterflies inside the manifold to open or close the short runners past 5400 rpm. This system has been used on many Mazda engines since including the BP. The K-series V6 engines used a different principle to the same effect dubbed VRIS. Two versions of the VICS intake system exist, one has steeper straighter runners than the other, which is kinked for vehicle packaging reasons. VICS was not present on the F8-DOHC or some of Kia version of the FE-DOHC, both of which use a conventional intake manifold design.

== F2 ==
The F2 is a stroked version of the FE with a bore and stroke of 86 mm × 94 mm (3.39 in × 3.70 in), for a displacement of 2.2 L (2,184 cc). Introduced for the 1988–1992 GD platform cars, it can also be found in the B2200 pickup and Ford Probe. A high-output variant of the F2 coded F2H2 was used in RWD configuration in the Mazda 929. The compression ratio was raised to 9.2:1 and produced 127 hp (95 kW; 129 PS)/141 lb⋅ft (191 N⋅m). Although available as an 8-valve SOHC in the B2200, this engine is most commonly a 12-valve SOHC. In federalized, North American specifications, with an 8.6:1 compression ratio, it generates 110 hp (82 kW; 112 PS) at 4700 rpm and 130 lb⋅ft (176 N⋅m).

Applications:

- 1986–1991 Mazda 929
- 1988–1992 Mazda 626
- 1988–1992 Mazda MX-6
- 1989–1992 Ford Probe
- 1987–1999 Mazda B2200

=== F2T ===
The F2T is a turbocharged version of the F2 equipped with an IHI-supplied RHB5 VJ11 turbocharger and an air-to-air intercooler. Internally the engine retains its bore and stroke of 86 mm × 94 mm (3.39 in × 3.70 in), but has a lower compression ratio of 7.8:1. It produces 145 hp (108 kW; 147 PS) at 4300 rpm and 190 lb⋅ft (258 N⋅m), using the SAE Net rating standards. Due to the increased torque output, Mazda was forced to increase the strength of the transmission for the F2T. Mazda developed the H-type transmission, their strongest gearbox yet for front wheel drive applications.

Applications:

- Mazda 626 GT
- Mazda MX-6 GT
- Ford Probe GT
- Ford Telstar TX5 Turbo

== R-series ==
The R-series engines are diesel variants that are very closely related to the F-series, sharing essentially the same engine block.

== Later engines with 'F' nomenclature ==
The FS and FP are structurally different from the original F-blocks with much smaller bore spacing, much shorter deck height and smaller head and journal dimensions. The FS and FP are more closely related to the Mazda BP engine than they are with the original F-engine.

=== FS ===
The 2.0 L (1,991 cc) FS has a bore and stroke of 83 mm × 92 mm (3.27 in × 3.62 in) and produces 130 PS (96 kW; 128 hp) and 135 lb⋅ft (183 N⋅m) in its most common variant up to 170 PS (125 kW; 168 hp) in the Japanese domestic market. In 1998 the engine evolved into the FS-DE by undergoing several changes, most notably a distributorless ignition as well as the move from hydraulic lifters to solid shim-on-bucket lifters. Japan received a couple of variations of the FS motor, all with increased power outputs. The highest is the Mazdaspeed Familia version of the FS-ZE which produces 170 PS (125 kW; 168 hp). Mazdaspeed US decided to turbocharge the US FS-DE, known as the FS-DET in 2003, for the Mazdaspeed Protegé. This model generates 170 hp (127 kW; 172 PS), practically the same as the naturally aspirated Mazdaspeed Familia edition FS-ZE but with a plumper torque curve. This means that the Mazdaspeed Protegé's engine is internally identical to the regular FS-DE, except with a turbocharger installed.

The updated FS-DE engine did enjoy a few minor technical features, such as:

- Oil Squirters
- VICS (Variable Inertial Charge System) - A system that can vary the volume of the intake manifold resulting in a broader power band. There were known issues with this system, the most noteworthy was a defect which allowed screws that secured the VICS butterfly valves to come loose and end up being sucked into the engine. Some engines had to be replaced entirely due to the extent of the damage caused.
- VTCS (Variable Tumble Control System) - A set of butterflies in the intake manifold that would close to promote low emissions combustion under cold start at low engine speeds. These had a reputation of being noisy at times.
- Windage Tray

Applications:

- 1993–2002 Mazda 626
- 1993–1997 Mazda MX-6
- 1999–2001 Mazda MPV (Japan)
- 1999–2003 Mazda Capella
- 2001–2003 Mazda Protegé
- 1993–1997 Ford Probe
- 1993–1999 Ford Telstar

=== FP ===
The 1.8 L (1,839 cc) FP is a destroked version of the FS, with a bore and stroke of 83 mm × 85 mm (3.27 in × 3.35 in). It produces 122 hp (91 kW; 124 PS) and 120 lb⋅ft (163 N⋅m). This engine is often incorrectly called the F8, which is the earlier destroked engine based on the FE. The FP enjoys a much better power band vs the FS due to slightly different camshafts and a better rod ratio over the regular FS-DE.

The FP is very close to the FS in many ways and shares a large percentage of parts but has its own FP specific block, crank, rods, pistons and timing belt. The pistons for the FS produce a compression ratio of 9.1:1 (USDM) but when FP pistons are used in the FS they yield 9.7:1 compression ratio. The biggest performance difference is that the European 1.8L FP & 2.0L FS both have maximum compression of 15 bar (220 psi) vs the North American 2.0L FS which has a maximum compression of 11.5 bar (167 psi). The KL & FS ATX engines both require 10° BTDC ignition timing while the FS MTX & FP require 12° BTDC. The FP does not share the same G25M-R transmission as the FS. In the Protegé it uses a F25M-R instead.

Applications:

- 1992–1993 Eunos 500
- 1997–2001 Mazda Capella/Mazda 626
- 1999–2000 Mazda Protegé (ES models only)
- 1998–2003 Mazda 323 Astina & Protege (Australia)
- 1998–2002 Ford Laser
- 1999–2004 Mazda Premacy
