= Mazda MX-5 (NB) =

Second generation of the Mazda MX-5 car manufactured from 1998 until 2005

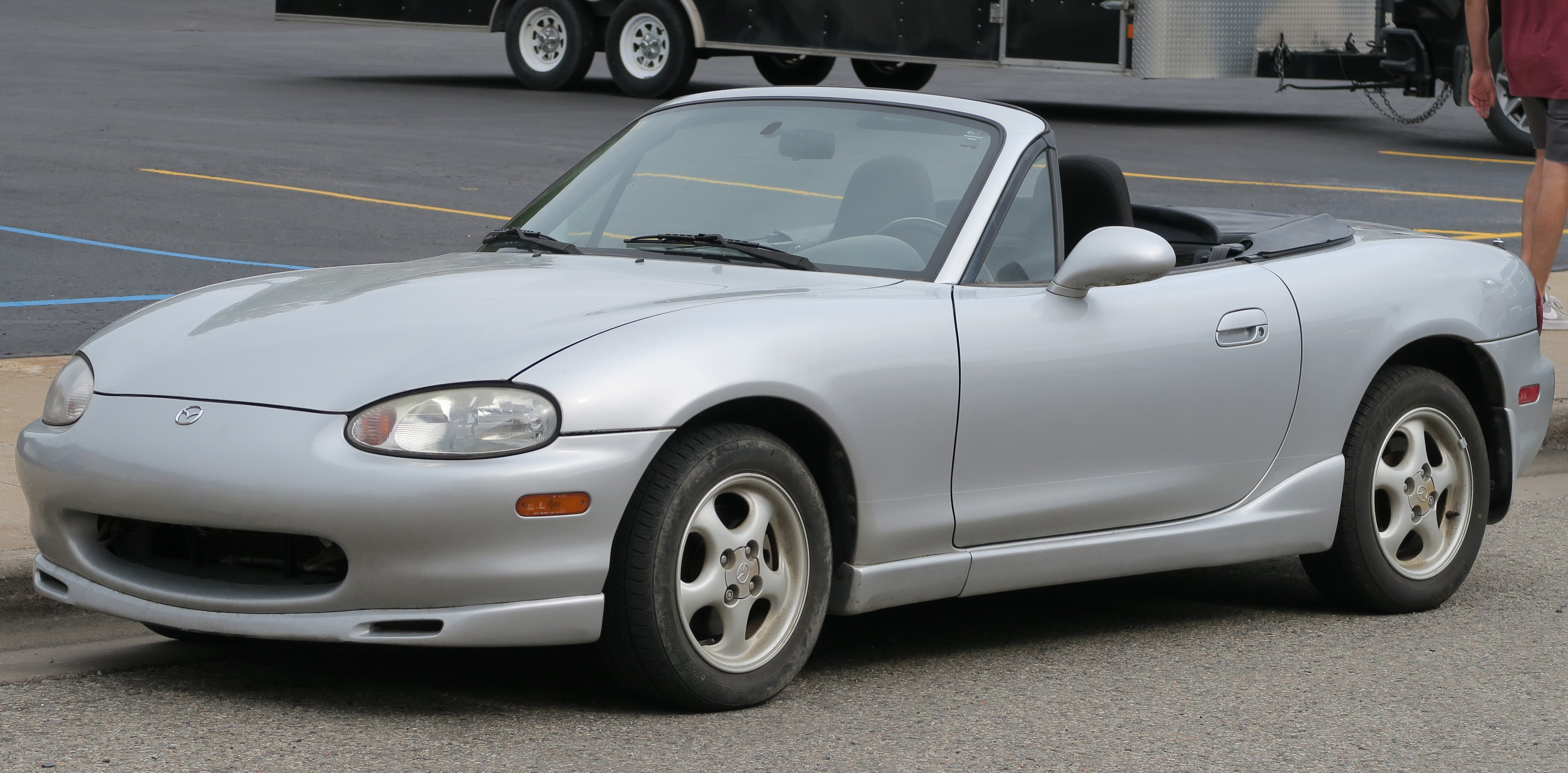

Overview
- Manufacturer: Mazda
- Model code: NB
- Also called: Mazda Roadster (Japan); Mazda Miata (North America, 1999–2002); Mazda MX-5 Miata (North America, 2003–2005)
- Production: January 1998 – 2005
- Assembly: Japan: Hiroshima (Ujina Plant No. 1)
- Designer: Tom Matano (1995)

Body and chassis
- Class: Roadster, sports car (S)
- Body style: 2-door convertible 2-door coupé
- Layout: Front-engine, rear-wheel-drive layout

Powertrain
- Engine: 1.6 L (98 cu in) B6-ZE I4 (Europe/Japan); 1.8 L (110 cu in) BP-5A I4 (Japan); 1.8 L (110 cu in) BP-4W I4; 1.8 L (110 cu in) BP-Z3 I4; 1.8 L (110 cu in) turbocharged BPT I4 (Mazdaspeed)
- Transmission: 5-speed manual 4-speed Aisin 03-72LE automatic 6-speed Aisin AZ6 manual

Dimensions
- Wheelbase: 2,270 mm (89.4 in)
- Length: 3,940–3,950 mm (155.1–155.5 in)
- Width: 1,680 mm (66.1 in)
- Height: 1,220–1,230 mm (48.0–48.4 in)
- Curb weight: 1,065 kg (2,348 lb)

Chronology
- Predecessor: Mazda MX-5 (NA)
- Successor: Mazda MX-5 (NC)

The Mazda MX-5 (NB) is the second generation of the Mazda MX-5 manufactured from 1998 until 2005. The model continued the MX-5's philosophy of being a lightweight, front mid-engine, rear-wheel-drive roadster while featuring numerous performance improvements, however lacking its predecessor's retractable headlamps. The NB is also the only generation to feature a factory-built turbocharged variant in the form of the Mazdaspeed MX-5.

== Overview ==
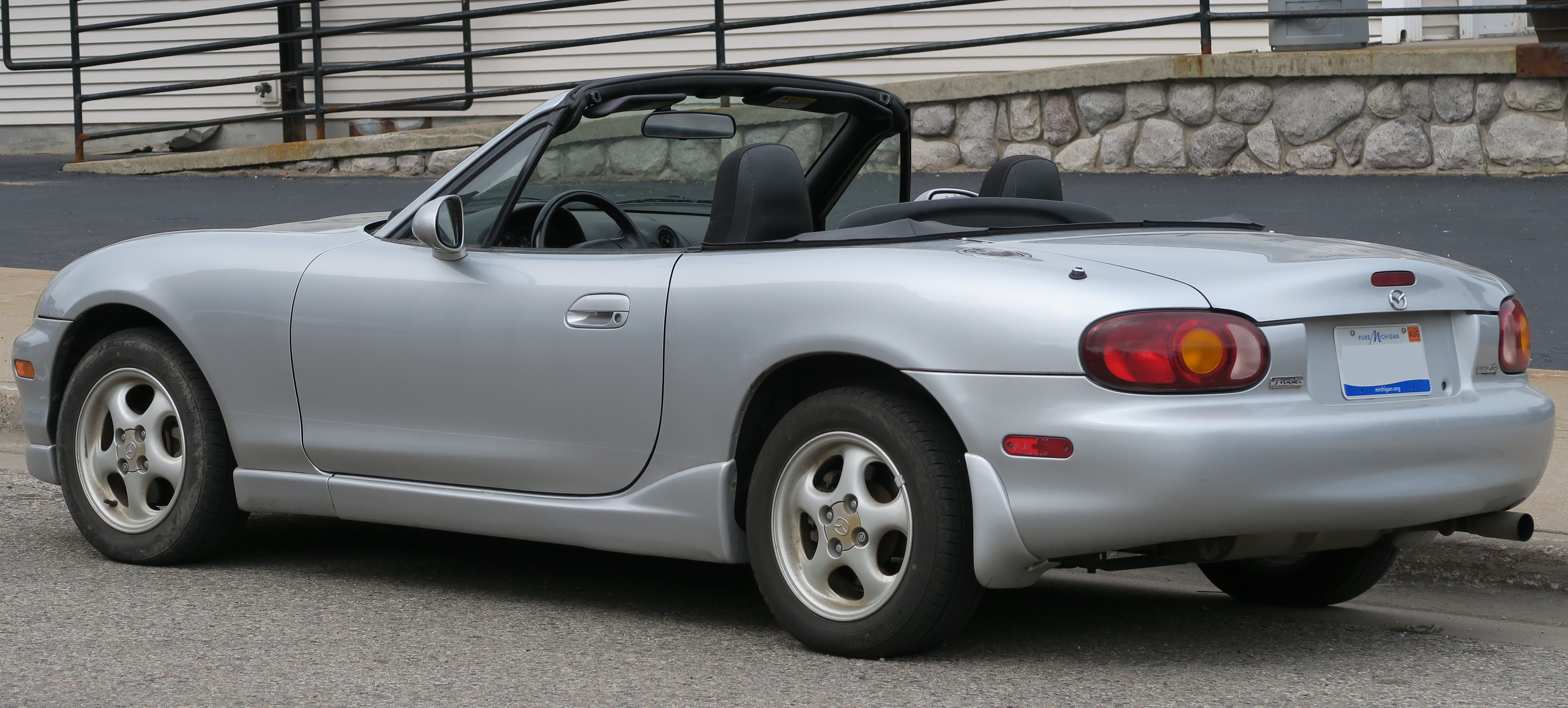
Pre–facelift Mazda MX-5 (NB) convertible (North America)

The redesigned MX-5 was previewed at the Tokyo Motor Show in October 1997. In February 1998, Mazda released the second-generation MX-5, production code NB, for the 1998 model year, The NB featured a more powerful engine and external styling cues borrowed from the third generation Mazda RX-7, designed in 1995 by Tom Matano. Prices in the United States, the main market for the MX-5, started at US$19,770.

Although many parts of the interior and body were different, the most notable changes were the headlamps: the first generation's retractable headlamps no longer passed pedestrian safety tests and were replaced by fixed ones. The new car grew slightly in width compared to the earlier model and was slightly more aerodynamic than the original, with a drag coefficient of Cd=0.36. Other notable improvements include a glass rear window with defogger for the convertible top and an optional hinged wind deflector behind the seats.

The NB continued to employ four-wheel independent suspension, with enlarged anti-roll bars at the front and rear, but the wheels, tires and brakes were significantly upgraded: anti-lock braking system was offered as an option; alloy wheels were now 14-inches (360 mm) or 15-inches (380 mm) in diameter and 6-inches (150 mm) in width, depending on the trim package; sports models were equipped with the larger wheels and 195/50VR15 tires.

The BP-4W engine remained at 1.8 L (110 cu in) but received several minor updates. The engine compression ratio was raised from 9.0:1 to 9.5:1 by adding slightly domed pistons. The intake cam was changed to a solid lifter design with a stronger cam; the intake runners in the head were straightened and the intake manifold was mounted higher up. Mazda's Variable Intake Control System was introduced, which effectively gave a long narrow intake manifold at low rpm for better swirl, changing to a short, free-flowing manifold at high rpm for maximum breathing. Power output of the new engine was quoted at 104.4 kW (140.0 bhp) with 157 N⋅m (116 lbf⋅ft) of torque.

The 1.6 L (98 cu in) B6 engine remained available in Europe and Japan. The base-model 1.8 L (110 cu in) NB could reach 100 km/h (62 mph) in 7.8 s and had a top speed of 210 km/h (130 mph).

== MX-5 10th Anniversary Model (1999) ==
In 1999, Mazda celebrated the 10th anniversary of the MX-5 with the 10th Anniversary Model, a limited edition featuring some until-then exclusive features, namely a 6-speed manual transmission and Bilstein shock absorbers; 15 inch polished aluminum wheels with 195/50R15 tires and a Torsen limited-slip differential as standard. Performance figures were slightly different, with quicker acceleration and higher top speed than the standard 5-speed model. The model's nickname among owners and enthusiasts was 10AM or 10AE (as in "10th Anniversary Edition"). The car had a unique Sapphire Blue Mica (called Innocent Blue in Japan) paint colour with two-toned black leather and blue Alcantara seats and floor mats, matching 3-spoke Nardi leather wrapped steering wheel and shift knob, BOSE audio system, bright gauge rings, carbon grained center console panel and stainless steel scuff plates. The addition of the sixth gear resulted in different performance results, with 0–100 km/h (62 mph) in 7.6 seconds, 0.3 seconds faster than the standard 5-speed model, according to Car and Driver, and 0.4 seconds faster according to Motor Trend. Also thanks to the new 6-speed, its top rated speed increased from 210 to 214 km/h (130 to 133 mph). Combined fuel consumption improved from 8.5 to 8.0 L/100 km (33 to 35 mpg_{‑imp}; 28 to 29 mpg_{‑US}).

Each car was sequentially numbered on a badge on the driver-side front quarter panel. A "Certificate of Authenticity" with the same number came with each car, signed by Mazda President James E. Miller and dated 10 February 1999. On certain markets, a gift set was also included, consisting of a 1:43 scale diecast model, two Seiko-branded wristwatches (his and hers) with matching blue faceplate and Miata logo, and metal keychain in the form of the Miata logo, all encased in a luxury blue velvet box.

Despite the publicity that Mazda gave to this model, it took more than a year to sell all units, drawing criticism that too many units had been produced (another factor was the high price with an MSRP of $26,875, about $6500 more than a base model). 7,500 units of the 10th Anniversary were produced, with 3,700 distributed to Europe (of which: 600 – UK, 20 – Portugal), 3,150 to North America (of which 3,000 to US and 150 to Canada), 500 to Japan and 150 to Australia, with car number 7,500 being sold in the UK.

Of particular interest for the US models is that they came with air conditioning. Approximately 100 units came equipped with the hard top option. To set the U.S. and Canadian models apart visually, US models were equipped with the front dam and fog lights. Canadian models came with a rear spoiler. For example, US #3143 was 50 State emission legal (met California Air Resources Board (CARB) emission requirements), where 49 State emission requirements met Federal (FED) requirements. This unit also was equipped with ABS. Most units in California sold at a "premium". Depending what option(s) it had, i.e., CARB or FED, ABS and/or hard top, premiums of $3,500 to $5,000 were added on. Unit # 3143 had an added premium of $3675, making the selling price $30,550. The vehicle was sold in June 1999 for $28,950 without a "Certificate of Authenticity".

For comparison, there were 3,500 units of the NC's 3rd Generation Limited launch model in 2005, and regular limited editions produced each year do not usually exceed 1,500 units per region. The polished aluminum wheels are notorious for corroding once the thin lacquer coating is damaged. Mazda replaced thousands of sets under warranty. There were minor differences in specification according to the market, such as no sports appearance package (front/side/back skirts, rear wing) or air conditioning for Europe.

== Mono-Posto (2000) ==
Introduced at the 2000 SEMA Show, the Mono-Posto concept was designed to be a single-seat sports car inspired by the Lotus Eleven and Jaguar D-Type.

== Facelift (2001) ==
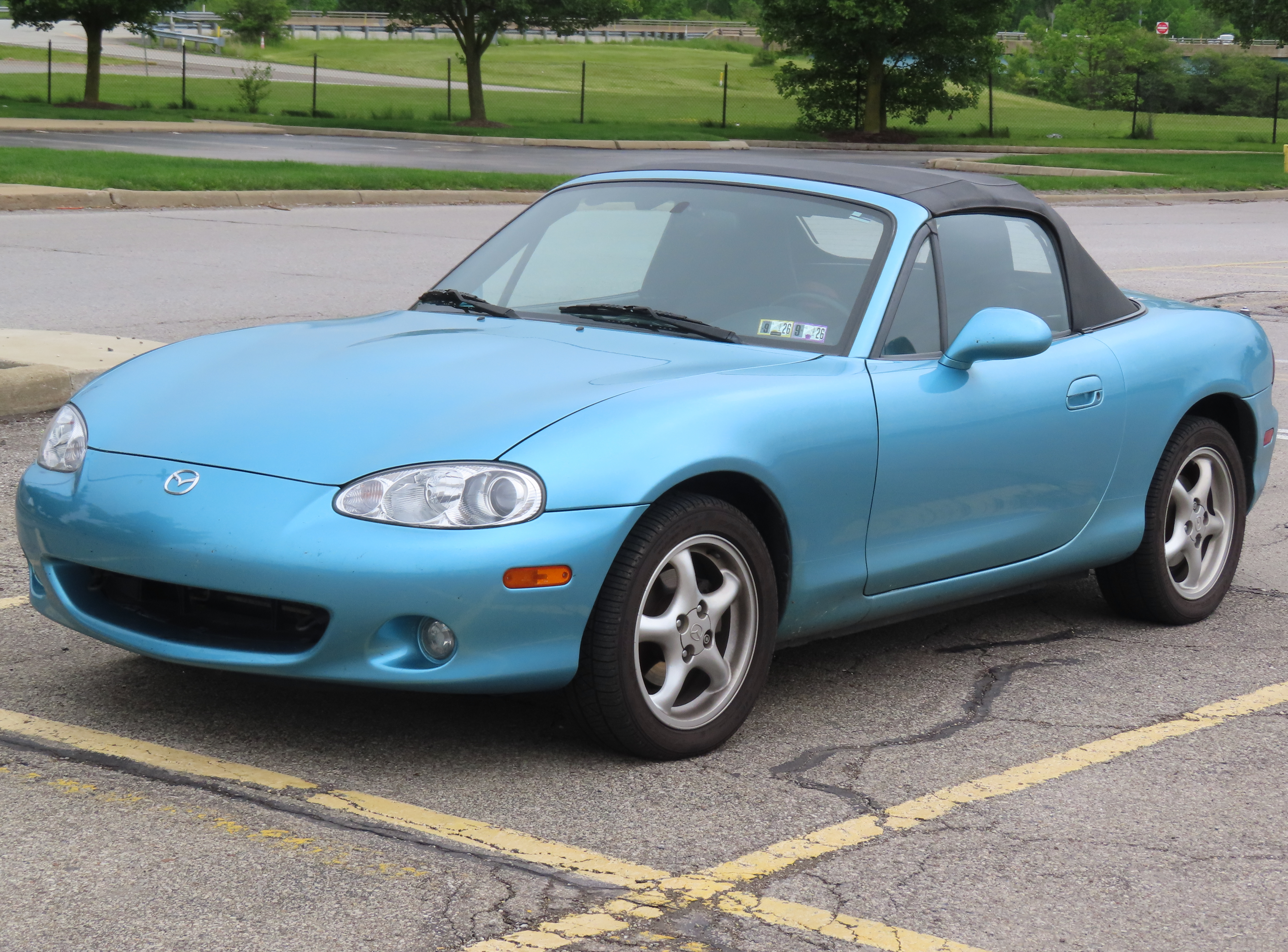

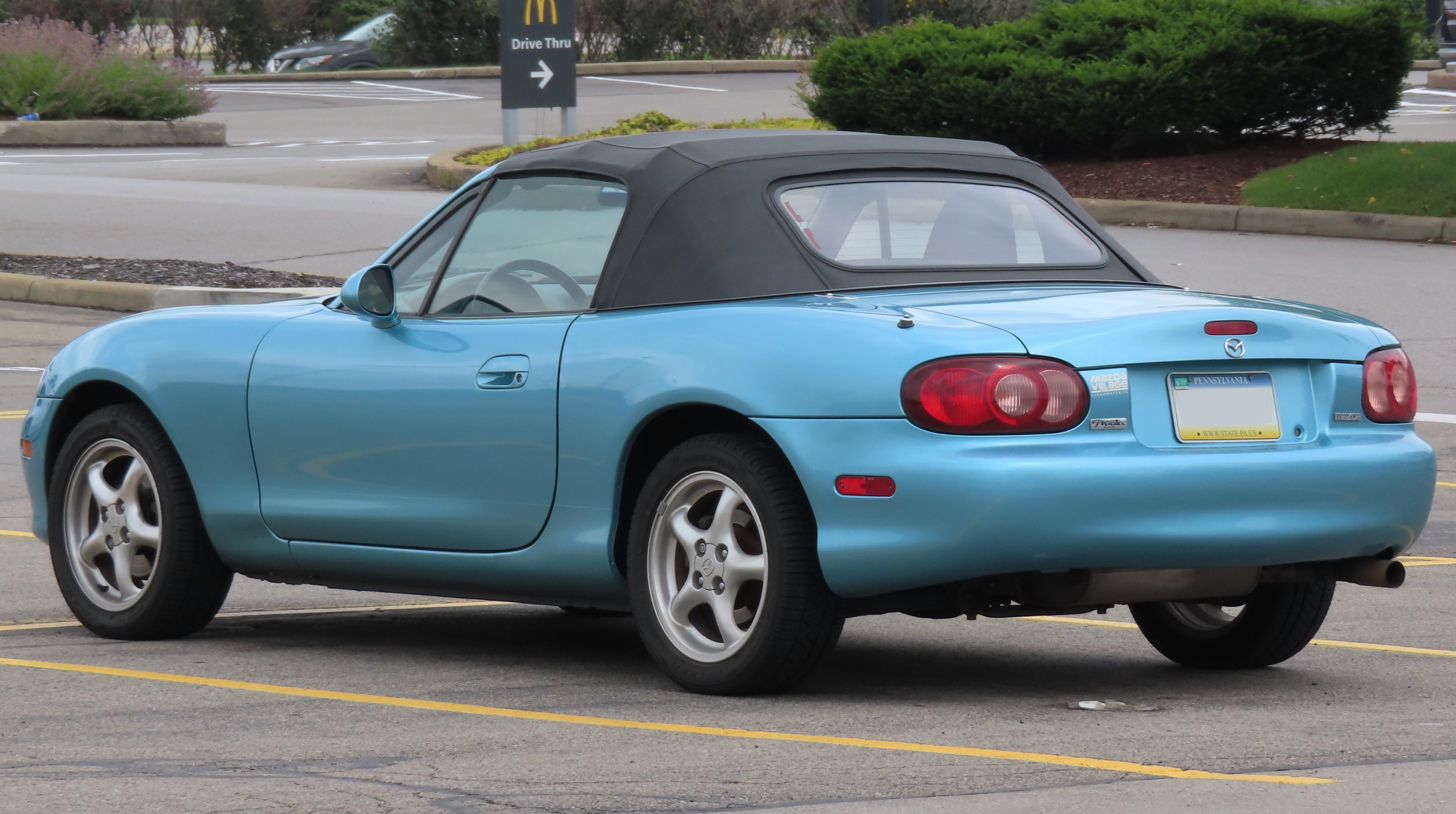
2001 facelift

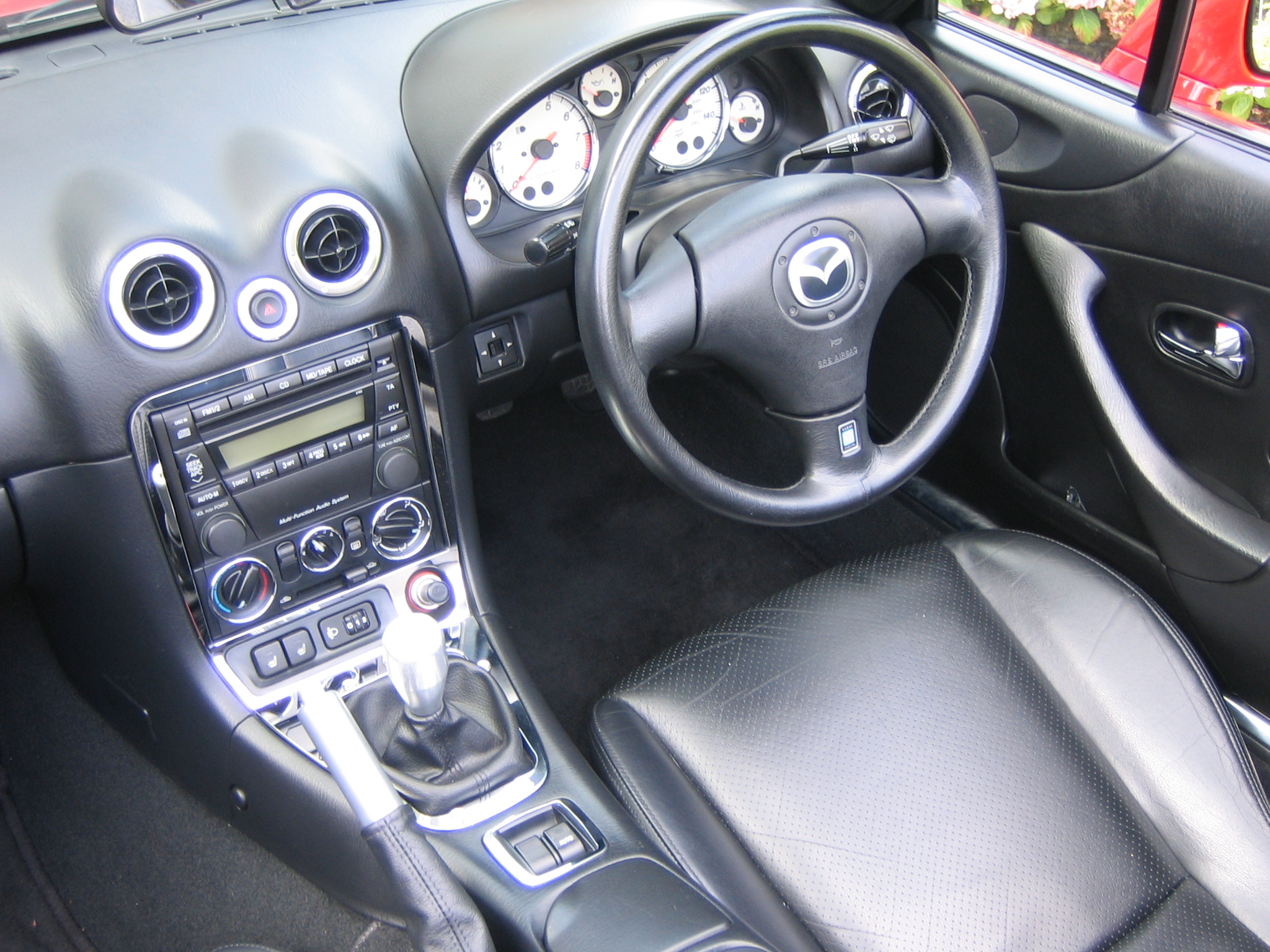
Facelift interior. There are many improvements over the Mk1 Interior, but it still retains the original functional layout and feel

For the 2001 model year, a facelift to the second-generation MX-5 was released. There were some minor exterior changes, with a press-release of July 18, 2000, announcing the changes as "resulting in an even sportier and more forceful look". Fog lamps, previously an option, were made standard. The headlamps now featured projector style low beams and separate high beam lenses. The rear turn signals lamps were changed from amber to clear to make the car look more modern. Some cockpit elements were changed, the most notable being the redesigned center console, and the white faced and red backlit instrument panel gauges from the 2000 Special Edition were made standard, replacing the previous blue faced gauges. The seats were also upgraded, incorporating more support in the side bolsters and taller headrests. Added for top models (designated 'Sport' in the U.K) were 16-inch (410 mm) wheels with 205/45VR16 low-profile tires, larger brakes at the front and rear, additional chassis stiffening braces, a limited-slip differential, a 6-speed manual transmission, Bilstein suspension and leather seats. The upgraded tires and suspension allowed the new model to pull 0.91 g in lateral grip in tests by Car and Driver magazine. The body was strengthened, gaining 16% in bending rigidity and 22% in torsional rigidity. With the minimum of options, the 2001 model weighed 1,065 kg (2,348 lb).

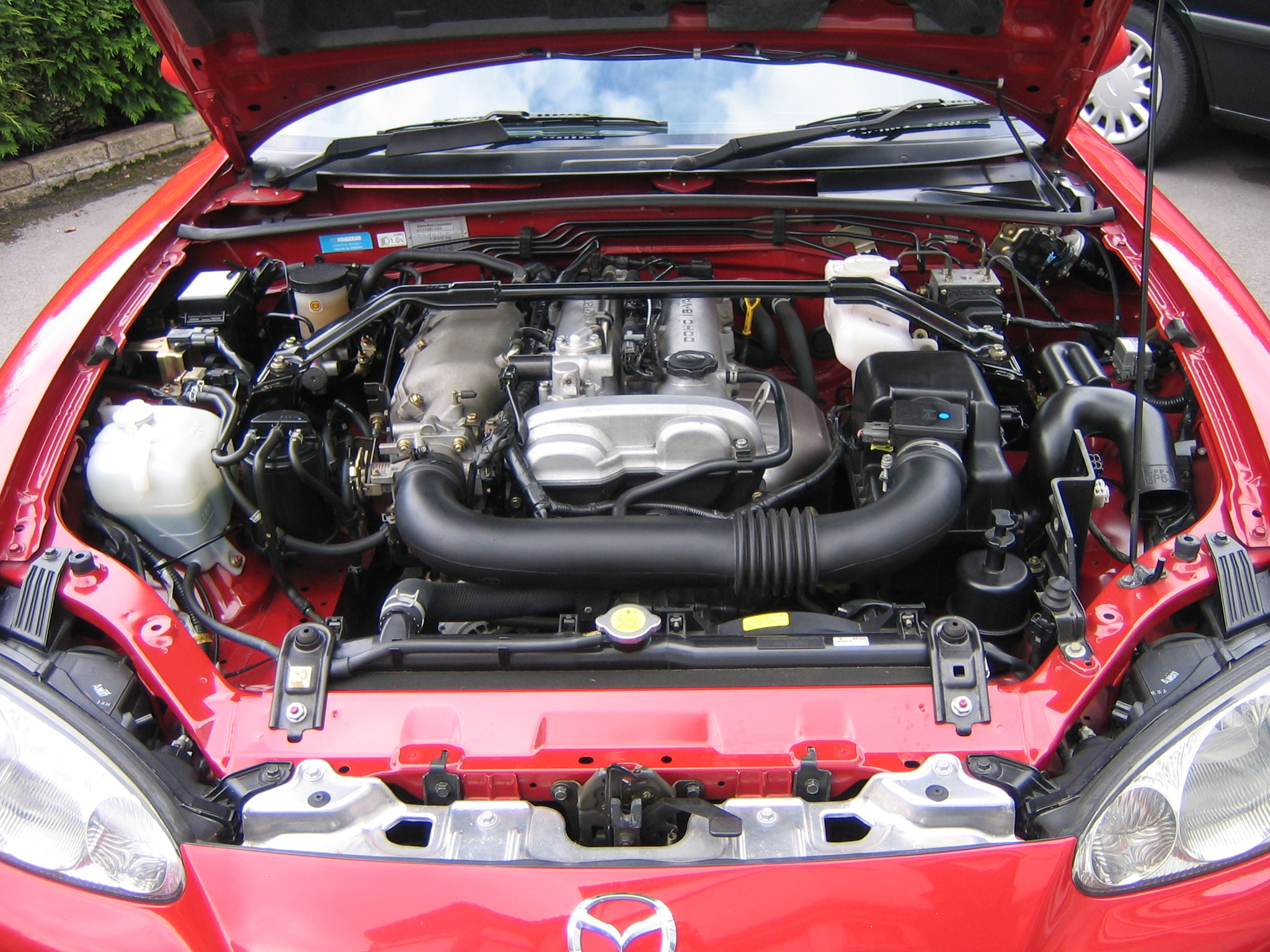
2002 Mazda MX5 1,840cc DOHC 4-cylinder engine, with variable valve timing on the intake camshaft

The 1.8 L (110 cu in) BP6D engine was slightly modified and now featured variable valve timing on the intake camshaft. The intake and exhaust system also received a minor upgrade. These modifications resulted in a power output of 113 kW (152 bhp) (Japan, UK and Australia) or 107 kW (143 bhp) (US only). In the United States, Mazda erroneously quoted the power figure for the Japanese and Australian model in early catalogues. Car and Driver magazine and numerous owners confirmed the missing power, and Mazda offered to buy back the 2001 cars due to those misleading power claims. Owners who did not take up the buy back offer were offered an apology and free servicing for the warranty period.

In 2003 Mazda launched a campaign to target a younger group of drivers with the introduction of the Shinsen Version (SV) Miata. The Shinsen (Japanese for "Fresh and New") provided an intermediate step between the base model and the pricier LS. Equipped with most standard features on the LS, such as cruise control and aluminum brush trim. This limited production model also shared an inverted color scheme of the same year Special Edition with a titanium silver exterior and dark blue top and interior.

The 2003 Miata Club Sport (MCS) was a special edition MX-5 NB produced at the behest of the SCCA, and was featured prominently in the 2003 Miata sales brochure. Limited to 50 units, 25 were Classic Red with the other 25 being Pure White. A hard or soft top option was available. The MCS came with no power steering, air conditioning or ABS brakes. A Torsen limited-slip differential paired with a 5-speed Getrag transmission and a Bilstein suspension were other stock features to allow owners to compete in SCCA Solo or SCCA Road Racing events.

Also in 2003, a division of Mazda in Japan released the Roadster Coupé, with a fixed hardtop roof. The body structure was reworked to incorporate the roof and gave a substantial increase in chassis rigidity with a weight increase of 10 kg (22 lb). Production was limited to 179 units for Japan only, making this one of the rarest forms of the MX-5.

== MX-5 SP (2002) ==
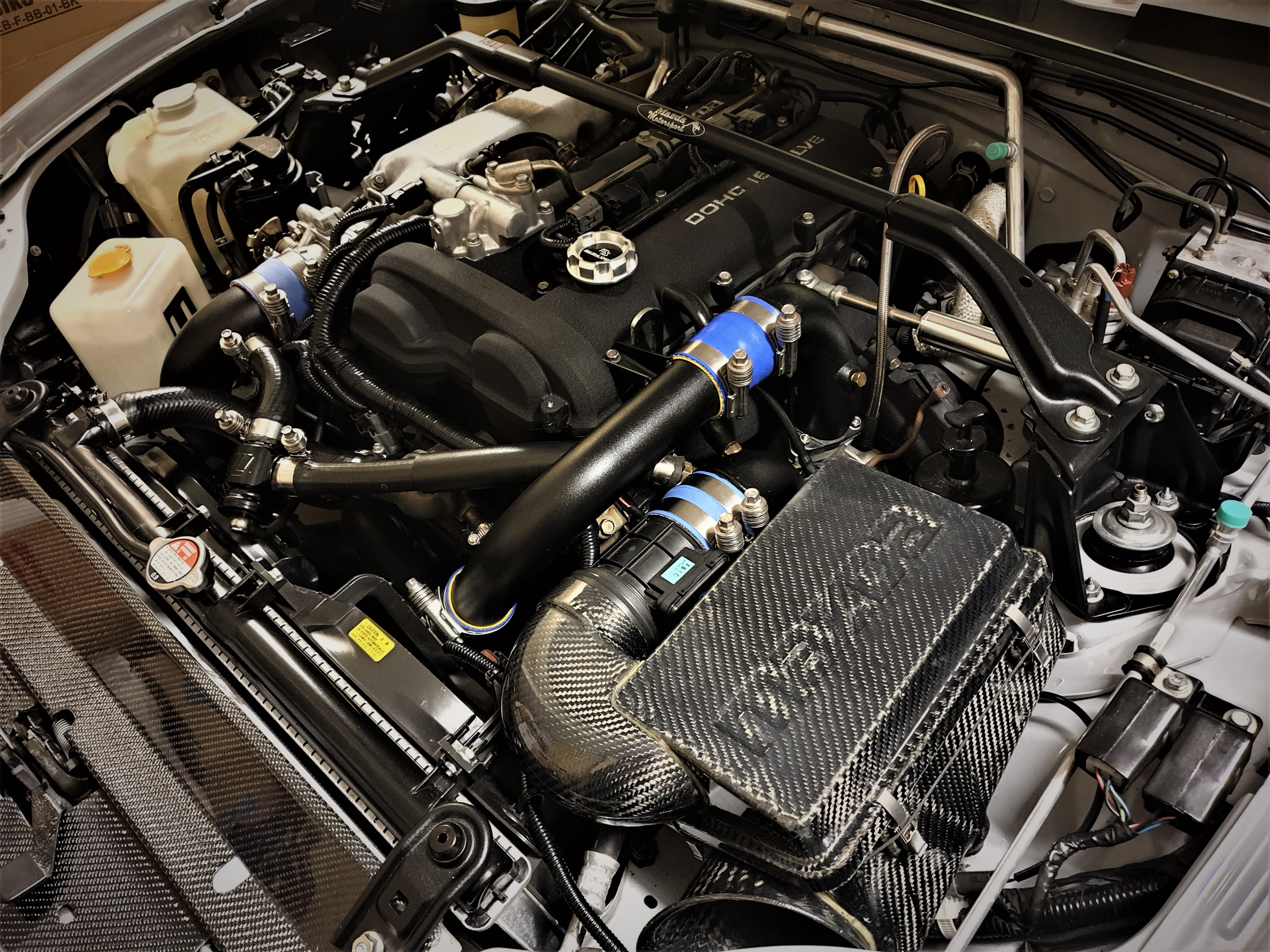
The engine bay of the MX-5 SP with the carbon-kevlar intake at the fore. The Mazda Motorsport decal is visible on the strut bar.

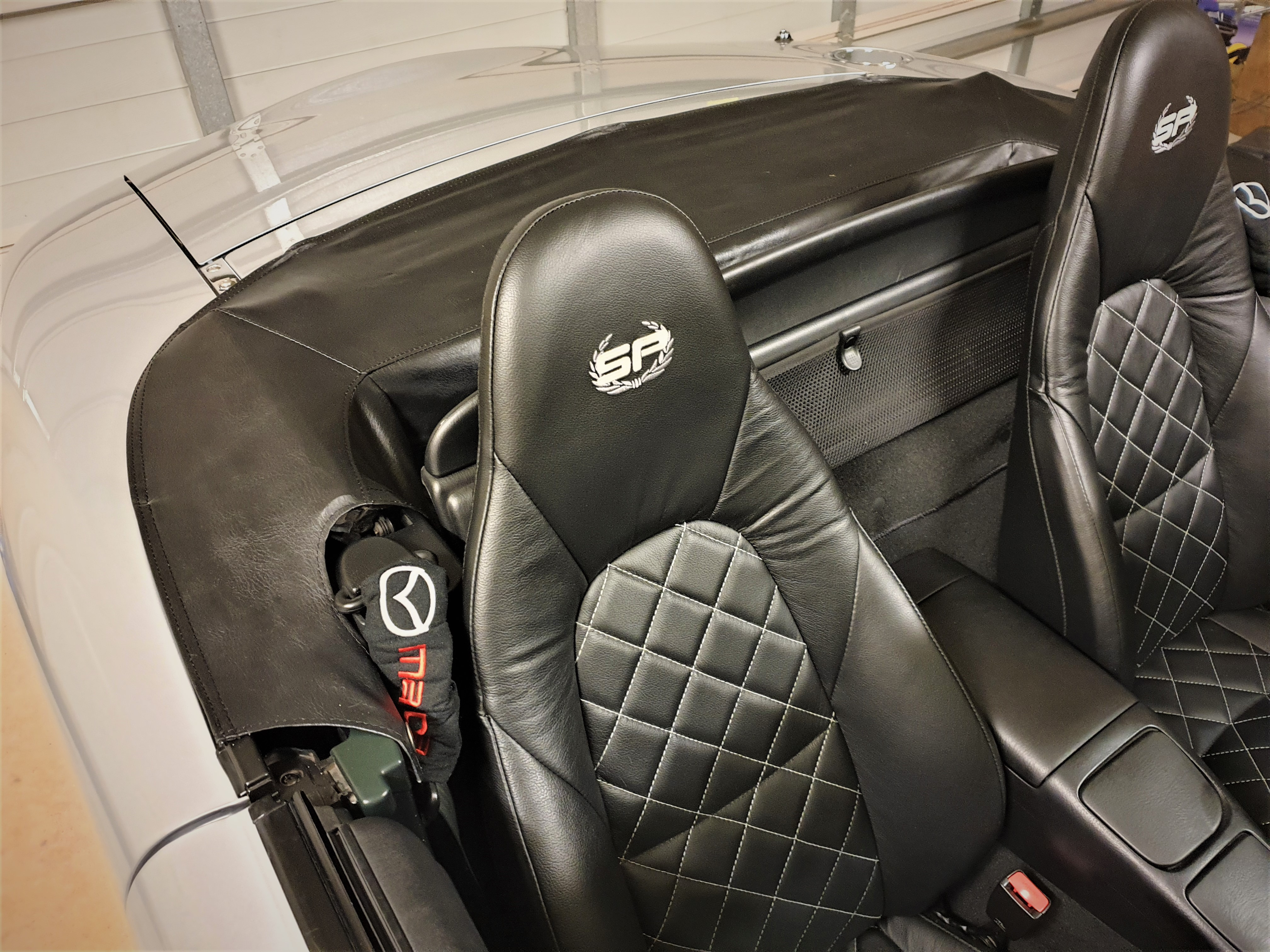
The SP logo was embroidered into the carpets of all SPs, this example has the logo in the headrest also.

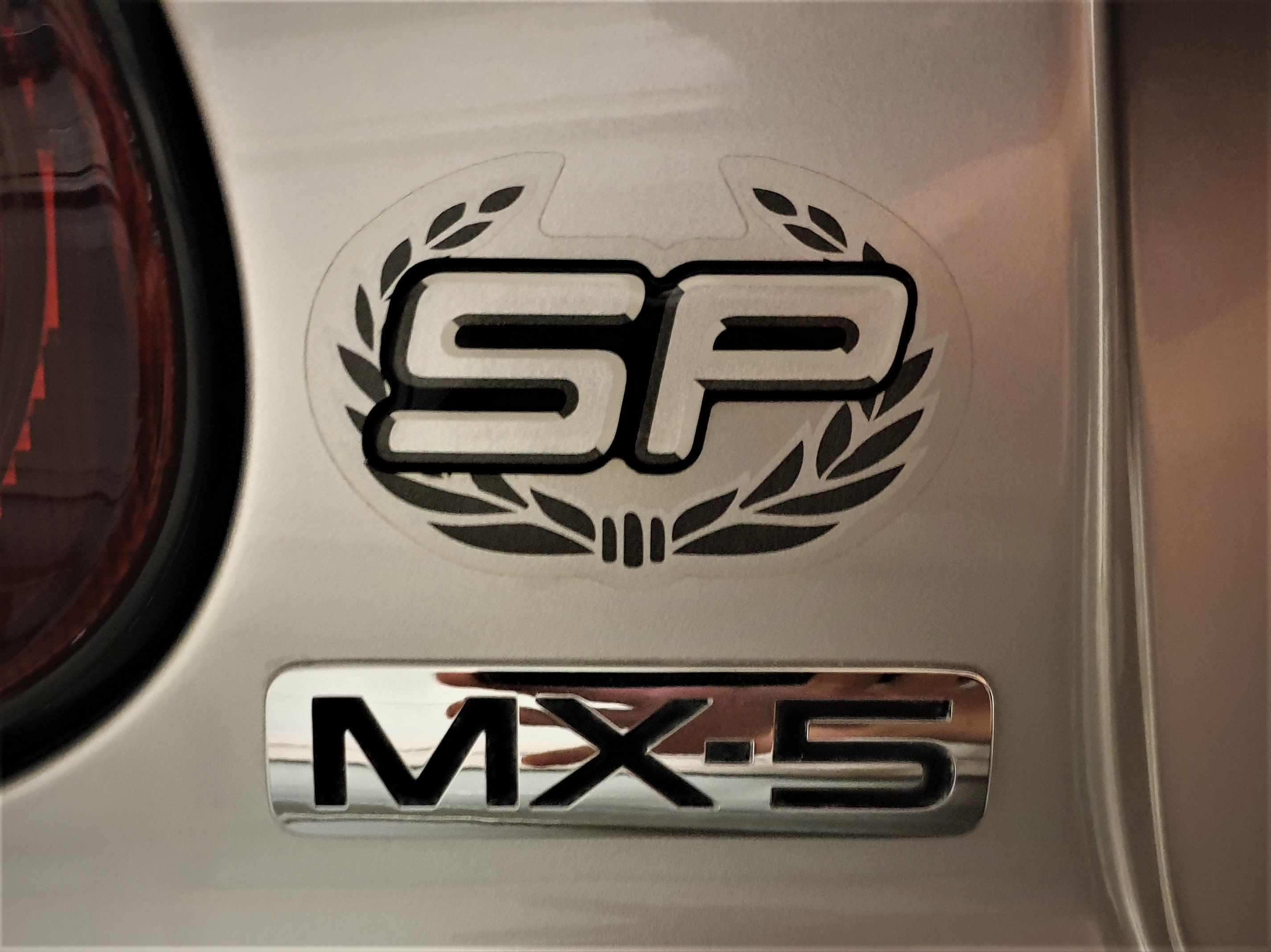
The SP decal was present on the rear of all SPs and was the only outwardly identifying mark

The 2002 MX-5 SP (Special Performance) was based on the 2001 facelift NB8B and was a limited production model of 100 vehicles. Performance was notably improved over the base model at 150 kW (200 bhp) and 280Nm of torque, up 33% and 55% over the standard model; as of 2026 this is still the most powerful factory released MX-5. This substantial increase in power allowed the car to complete the 0–100 km/h sprint in 6 seconds, compared to the base model's 8.5s and the later Mazdaspeed's 7.8s.

An extensive list of modifications were made to the base model cars in order to accommodate the extra performance. Externally the only visible changes to the vehicles' appearance are the 'SP' decal at the rear of the car, and the visible intercooler at the front. Some of the changes included the use of a Garrett GT2560R turbo fed by a cast inconel exhaust manifold, a custom ECU, stainless exhaust, and a prominent carbon-kevlar air filter housing. Rerouting of the air-conditioning, power steering and wipers were required leading to hundreds of unique parts for the SP. Part of the development cycle for the car involved extensive testing from Mazda Motorsport, where the prototype car was entered in the 2001 Targa Tasmania in road going trim and finishing the event in 20th place outright.

The extensive list of changes increased the cost of the SP to be substantially higher than the base model and the later Mazdaspeed. In 2002 the SP was sold for A$55,540 in Australia compared to A$40,530 for the base model. In 2004 the Mazdaspeed, sold as the SE in Australia, sold for A$45,490. Allowing for inflation, the equivalent price of an SP in 2019 would have been A$83,202. The commercial success of the SP paved the way for the development of the Mazdaspeed MX-5 released in 2004, which was detuned in order to accommodate a larger market appeal.

== Mazdaspeed MX-5 (2004–2005) ==
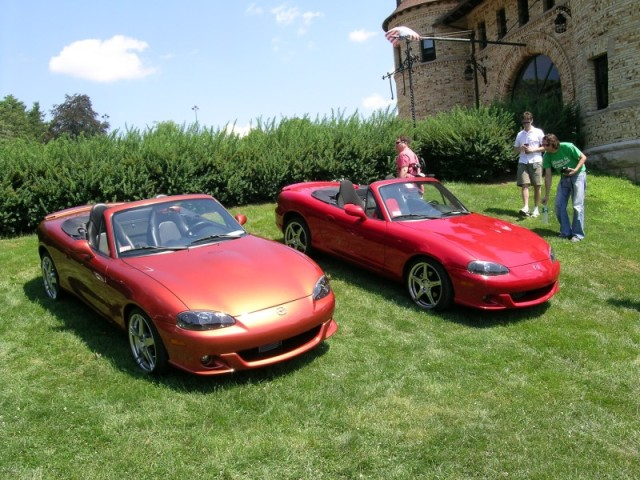
2005 Lava Orange Mazdaspeed Miata next to a 2004 Velocity Red Mazdaspeed Miata

The 2004 model year saw the introduction of the official turbocharged Mazdaspeed MX-5, Roadster Turbo in Japan. It featured an IHI RHF5 VJ35 turbocharger equipped variant of the BP-4W straight-four engine that produced 133 kW (178 bhp) at 6,000 rpm and 226 N⋅m (167 lbf⋅ft) of torque at 4,500 rpm with a front-mounted air-to-air intercooler. The Mazdaspeed could reach 97 km/h (60 mph) in 6.7 seconds and had a top speed of 204 km/h (127 mph) – limited due to reaching its 6,500 rpm rev limiter.

With its upgraded Bilstein shock absorbers and wider tires, the Mazdaspeed model could pull over 0.98 g in lateral grip. Other features included an upgraded six-speed transmission and clutch assemblies, upgraded drivetrain components, Racing Hart 17" (430 mm) alloy wheels and special interior trim. The 2004 Mazdaspeed MX-5 was only available in Velocity Red Mica and Titanium Gray Metallic for the US market and Velocity Red Mica for the Canadian market while the 2005 model was available additionally in Lava Orange Mica and Black Mica in the US market, with Canada receiving only Titanium Grey Mica.

Of the 5,428 Mazdaspeed MX-5s produced for the US market during model years 2004 and 2005, 4,000 were produced in 2004; the 2005 production run was shortened to only 1,428 due to a fire at the production facility. The other markets are not included in these totals; Canada received 295 in 2004 and only 78 of 300 planned in 2005. This model was also marketed in Australia as an MX-5 SE without any Mazdaspeed branding (exhaust tip excluded), featured 3.63 diff gears and was available in Sunlight Silver as well as Velocity Red Mica, Titanium Gray Metallic and Black Mica for 2005. It was also slightly de-tuned with only 121 kW (162 bhp). This was a result of lower boost pressure of 7.25 psi (0.5 bar) for the Australian model vs 8.5 psi (0.6 bar) of the North American and Japanese models. The MX-5 SE has been used for both gravel and tarmac rallying in Australia, showing the versatility of these cars in racing.

== Safety ==
Euro NCAP test results* Mazda MX-5 (2002)
Test	Score	Rating
Adult occupant:	25	4 /5 stars
Pedestrian:	7	1 /4 stars

The Euro NCAP Safety Ratings for MX-5s manufactured in 2002 were given 4 out of 5 stars for adult protection but only 1 out of 4 stars for pedestrian protection. Euro NCAP stated: "This is a poor performance despite the MX-5 benefiting from not having to have the leading edge of its bonnet tested because of its low profile."

ANCAP test results* Mazda MX-5 (2000)
Test	Score
Overall	4 /5 stars
Frontal offset	11.19/16
Side impact	13.91/16
Pole	Not Assessed
Seat belt reminders	0/3
Whiplash protection	Not Assessed
Pedestrian protection	Not Assessed
Electronic stability control	Not Assessed

== In media ==
The Mazda MX-5 NB was used as one of the hero cars in the 1998 TV series V.I.P.

In the manga and anime Initial D, the downhill racer of Team 246 in Kanagawa, Satoshi Omiya, drives an orange MX-5 NB8C with a large rear wing. He loses the race when he spins out after his car's rear wing breaks.

== Technical specifications (UK) ==
Drivetrain specifications by generation (UK market)
Model year(s)	Model no(s).	Chassis code(s)	Engine type	Engine code	Transmission(s)	Power@rpm	Torque@rpm
1998–2001	1.6i	NB	1.6 L inline-4	B6-ZE	5-speed MT	81 kW (108 bhp) @6,500	134 N⋅m (99 ft⋅lbf) @5,000
1998–2001	1.8i	NB	1.8 L inline-4	BP-4W	5 or 6-speed MT	100 kW (140 bhp) @ 6,500	161 N⋅m (119 ft⋅lbf) @ 5,000
2001–2005	1.6i	NB	1.6 L inline-4	B6-ZE(RS)	5-speed MT	92 kW (123 bhp) @ 6,500	134 N⋅m (99 ft⋅lbf) @ 5,000
2001–2005	1.8i	NB	1.8 L inline-4	BP-Z3	5 or 6-speed MT	109 kW (146 bhp) @ 6,500	168 N⋅m (124 ft⋅lbf) @ 5,000

== Awards and recognition ==
- Car and Driver's 10Best list from 1998 to 1999 and 2001
