= Mazda MX-3 =

Four-seat coupé by Mazda

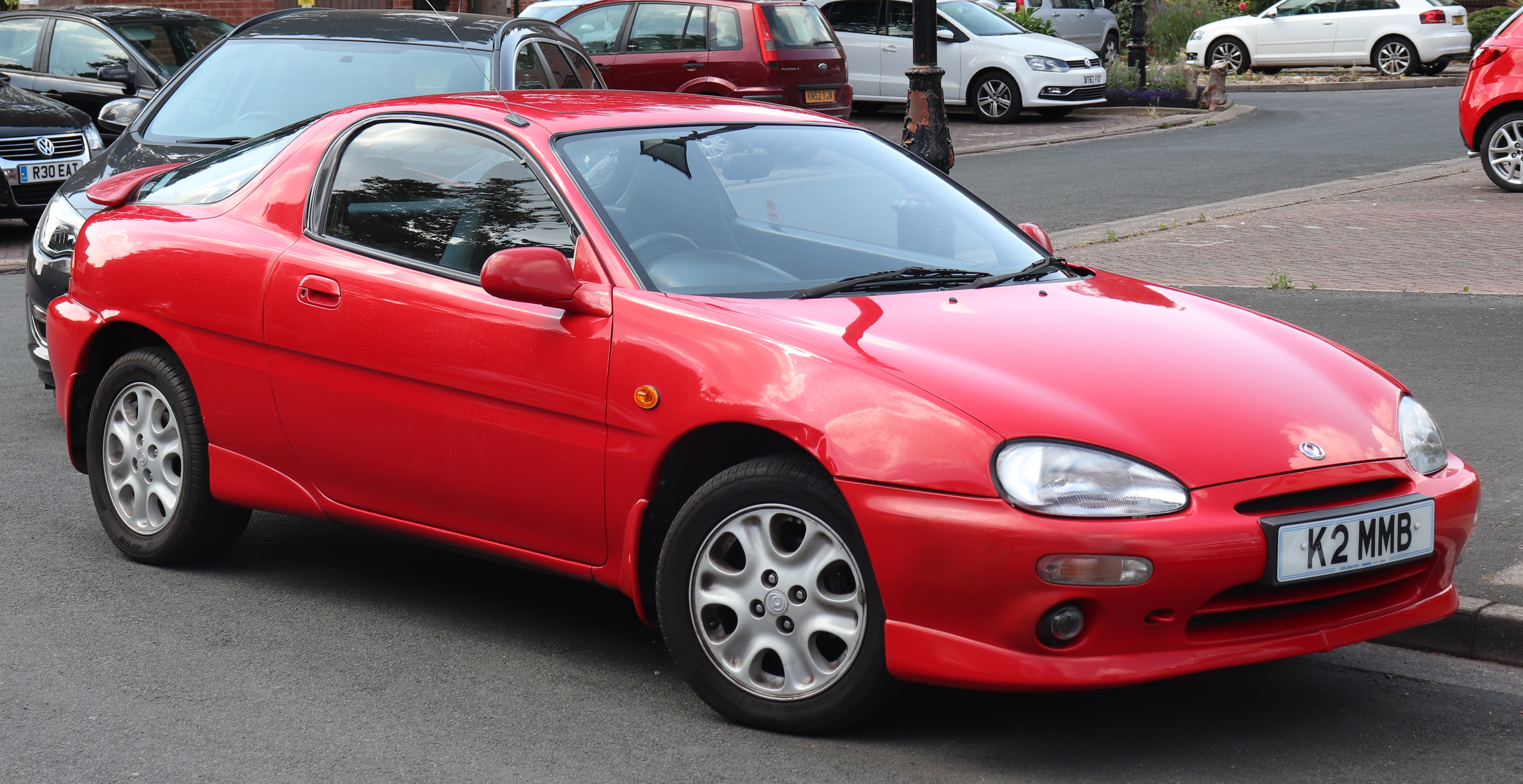
- 1992 MX-3 1.8

Overview
- Manufacturer: Mazda
- Model code: EC
- Also called: Mazda MX-3 Precidia; Eunos 30X (Australia); Mazda-Eunos 30X (Australia); Eunos Presso; Autozam AZ-3; Mazda AZ-3
- Production: 1991–1998
- Assembly: Japan: Hofu
- Designer: Takeshi Arakawa (1988)

Body and chassis
- Class: Sport compact
- Body style: 3-door 2+2 coupé
- Layout: FF layout
- Related: Mazda Familia/323/Protege

Powertrain
- Engine: 1.5 L B5-ZE I4 DOHC; 1.6 L B6-ME I4 SOHC; 1.6 L B6D I4 DOHC; 1.8 L K8 V6 DOHC
- Transmission: 5-speed G5M-R manual 4-speed F4A-EL automatic

Dimensions
- Wheelbase: 2,455 mm (96.7 in)
- Length: 4,208 mm (165.7 in)
- Width: 1,695 mm (66.7 in)
- Height: 1995-98: 1,321 mm (52.0 in); 1991-95 Base: 1,280 mm (50.4 in); 1991-95 GS: 1,285 mm (50.6 in)
- Curb weight: RS: 1,095 kg (2,414 lb); GS: 1,171 kg (2,582 lb)

Chronology
- Predecessor: Mazda Étude

The Mazda MX-3 is a 2+2-seat, front-wheel drive coupé of a kammback design, manufactured and marketed by Mazda. It was introduced at the Geneva Auto Show in March 1991 and marketed until 1998.

The MX-3 was also marketed as the Mazda MX-3 Precidia in Canada and as the Eunos Presso, Autozam AZ-3 and Mazda AZ-3 in Japan. In Australia it was marketed as the Eunos 30X until late 1996 when it became the Mazda-Eunos 30X.

== History ==
The MX-3's platform is called the EC platform, and shares much with the BG platform of the contemporary Familia/323/Protegé. The first model year was available in Japan, Europe, Australia, and North America where it went on sale in September 1991, as a 1992. Originally available with a single-cam 1.6-liter inline-four or the 1.8-liter twin-cam V6, a few more engines were available as development continued. In the summer of 1991, the Autozam AZ-3 was added to the Japanese market lineup. It was known by two names;"Autozam" was meant to be Mazda's more youthful brand, so it combined a somewhat lower price with a sportier (but smaller) twin-cam 1.5-liter four-cylinder engine, and also sold as the Eunos Presso, a companion, affordable sports hatchback to the Eunos Roadster.

The small displacement V6 was offered to set the small coupé apart in the marketplace, while providing a balanced, smooth running engine. Project Manager Tadayuki Hayashi had also used to be an avid motorcyclist and enjoyed engines with a peaky power delivery.

In January 1994, a DOHC version of the familiar B6 engine, the B6D, replaced the previous version. This provided a useful power increase but conversely also made the considerably more expensive V6 version less desirable. Sales of the V6 in the United States market came to an end after the 1994 model year, although they continued in Canada, Japan and many other export markets. While called K8-DE in North American specs, Japanese and other markets received an engine called the K8-ZE. Aside from emissions equipment and varying power claims due to myriad ratings methods, the differences are negligible.

Mazda referred to the car as a four-seater, but the rear seats were ostensibly designed to hold people of "AF 50" dimensions (50th percentile, Asian Female) and the car was a de facto 2+2 design. The MX-3 was only manufactured for one generation as the MX-5 proved more popular. As the Japanese asset price bubble effects became noticeable, Mazda had to cut back models that weren't selling well and the MX-3 was cancelled.

== Performance ==
The V6 MX-3 has a factory claimed top speed of 202 km/h (126 mph) in European trim. The US-spec MX-3 GS can accelerate from 0 to 60 mph (97 km/h) in 8.4 seconds, and can travel a quarter mile in 16.4 seconds. With a turning rate of 0.89 g (8.7 m/s²), its handling capabilities were among the best in its class.

The V6 engine belonged to the Mazda K-series, which were used in a range of Mazda vehicles. These engines use a Variable Length Intake Manifold (VLIM), in order to provide optimal torque using intake resonance. Mazda called their system on the MX-3 the "Variable Resonance Induction System" (VRIS). This engine had a 7,000 rpm redline, and a 7,800 rpm fuel cutoff.

For the rear suspension of the MX-3, Mazda used its proprietary Twin-Trapezoidal Link (TTL) technology, delivering benefits associated with active four-wheel steering systems while lighter and less mechanically complicated. Twin-Trapezoidal Link technology has been used on a range of other Mazda vehicles before and since the MX-3.

=== Models and specifications ===
Models (North America)

- RS • 1992-1996
- GS • 1992–1994 (Canada until 1995)

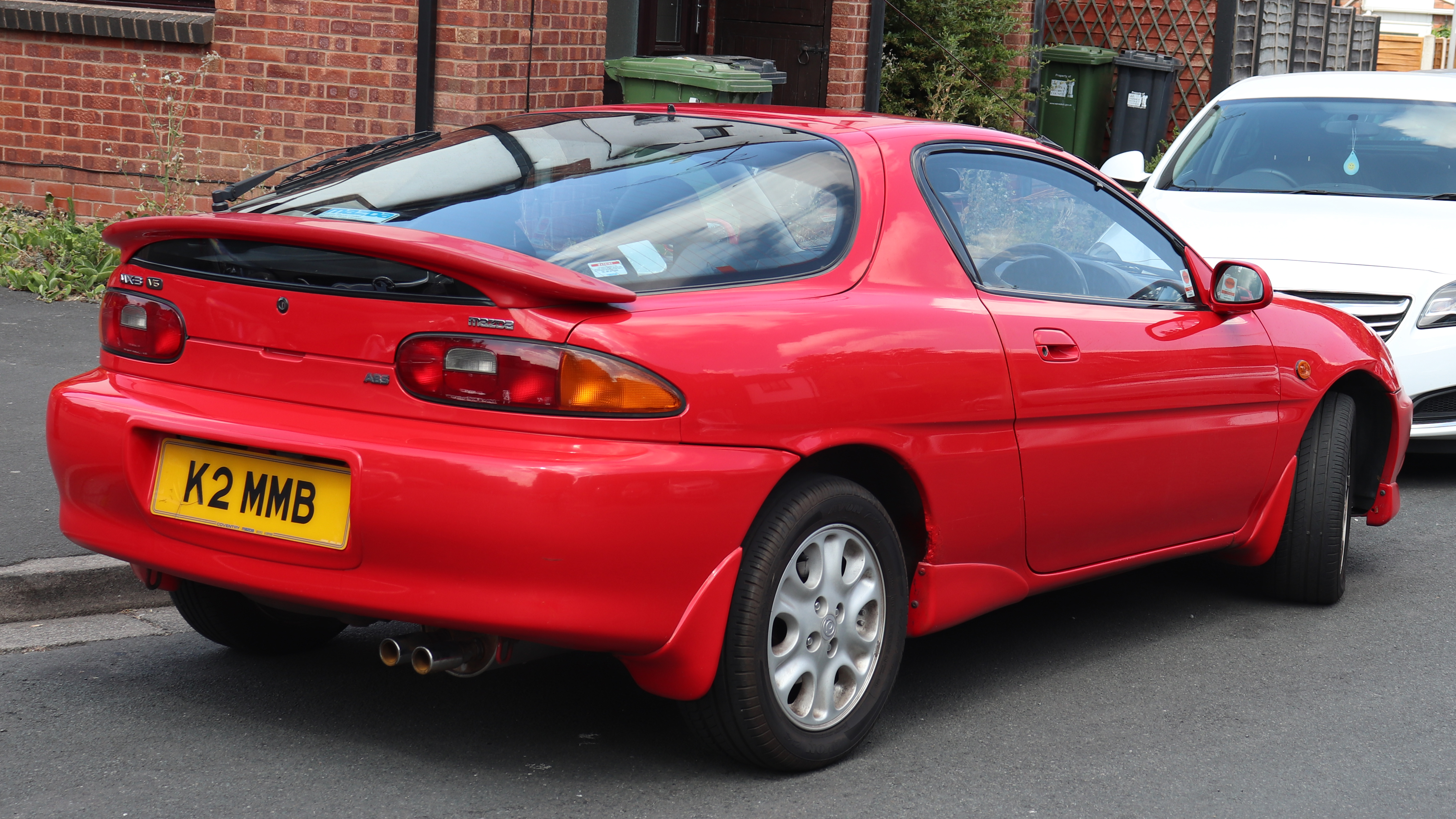
Rear (UK car)

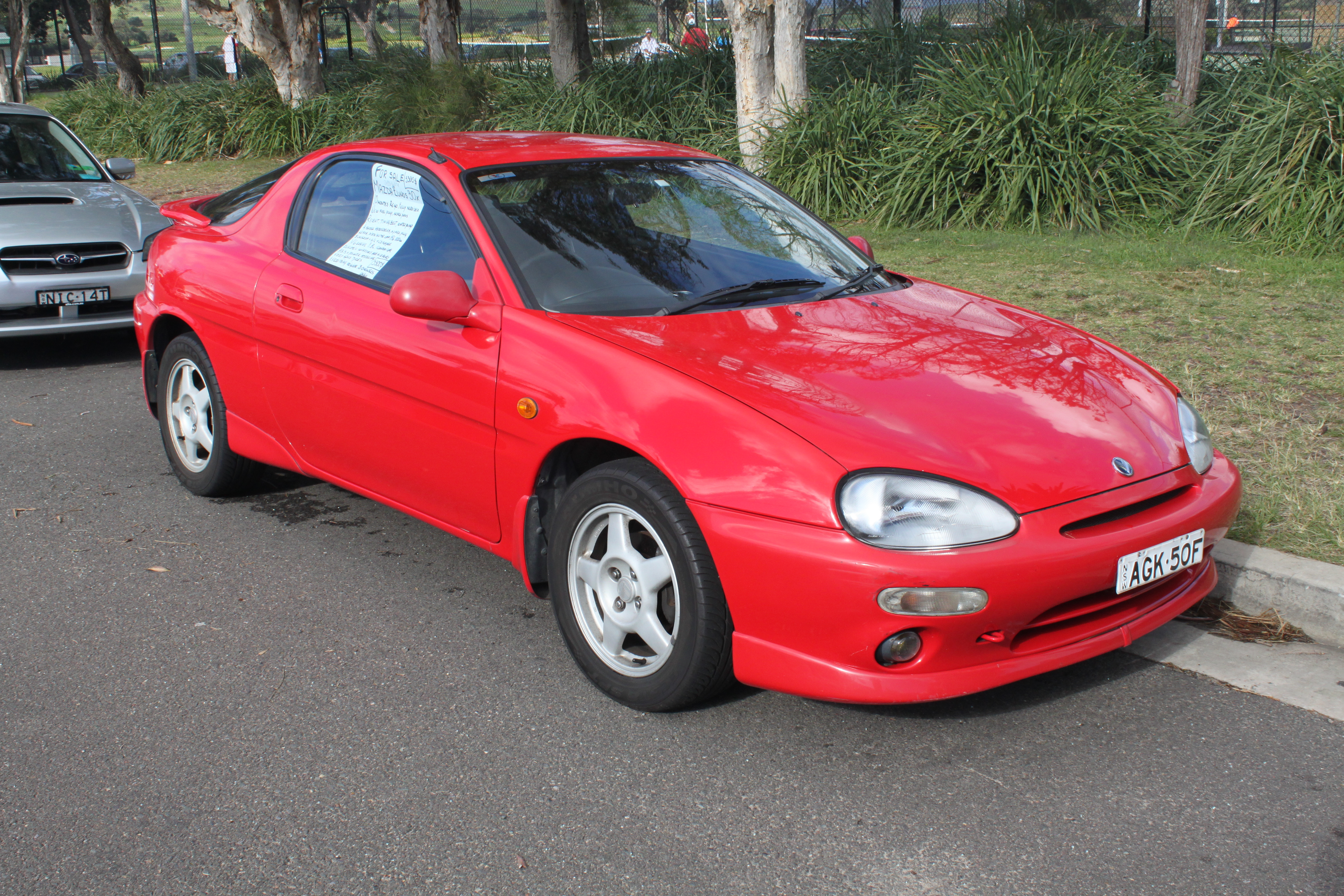
Eunos 30X (Australia)

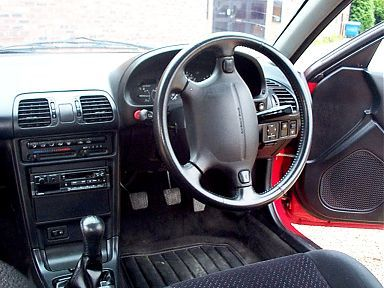
Interior

Engines

	1.6L B6-ME	1.6L B6-D	1.8L K8-DE
Type	SOHC 16-valve I4	DOHC 16-valve I4	DOHC 24-valve 60° V6
Power	88 hp (66 kW) at 5,000 rpm	106 hp (79 kW)	130 hp (97 kW) at 6,500 rpm
Torque	98 lb⋅ft (133 N⋅m) at 4,000 rpm		115 lb⋅ft (156 N⋅m) at 4,500 rpm
0-60 mph (0-97 km/h)			8.5 s
1/4 mile			16.8 s at 82.5 mph (133 km/h)
EPA fuel economy (mpg)		1994 5MT: 25 city, 28 combined, 34 highway, average 30.0	
Model years	1992-1993	1994-1998	1992-1998

== Special editions ==
In 1993, Mazda Canada offered a limited special edition model of its Mazda MX-3 GS to celebrate the company's 25th year in Canada. At the same time, Mazda USA offered a similar model in a special edition as well. Only a total of 2,000 were supposedly made. The special edition MX-3 featured the V6 engine, leather interior (including seats, steering wheel and shift knob), heated seats (Canada only), and custom Enkei manufactured 15 inch alloy wheels. Most special edition models came in the color "raspberry metallic"; however, there was also "blaze" red, "brilliant" black, and "laguna" blue.

In 1993, Mazda Europe produced 100 Mazda MX-3 V6 SEs. These had a leather and suede interior, and all had the clear white body color. There were also a limited number of Mazda MX-3 V6 Equipes, with "sparkle green metallic" or "noble" green exteriors.

== Modifications ==
Comparison chart of typical MX-3 engine swaps

The MX-3 is becoming a rare car, so modifications for it can be difficult to find unless one knows where to look, since it has not been sold in North America since 1997. Since the MX-3 has two engine classes, I4 and V6, many of the engine performance modifications are dependent upon what platform is installed.

There is now a decent range of body modifications for the MX-3 along with performance brakes and suspension. Most extensive modification must be entirely custom fabricated due to limited availability.

=== RS ===
The MX-3 RS with the four-cylinder engine can upgrade to the BP 132 hp (98 kW), B6-T 147 hp (110 kW), BP-T 179 hp (133 kW) and BPD-T 206 hp (154 kW) engines.

Swapping of the four-cylinder RS engines is slightly more complicated than the V6 GS mainly due to ECU, wiring harness, and MAF combinations as well as motor mounts. The V6 swaps require specific ECU, intake manifold, and VAF sensor combinations, but there are far fewer variables to deal with. Many improvements can be made after the engine swap and during the engine tuning process to find the best combination of engine peripherals.

=== GS ===
The most common engine swap for MX-3 GS owners with the V6 engine is a 2.5 L V6, either a North American-spec KL-DE 168 hp (125 kW), found most commonly in the 1993–1997 Ford Probe GT, the 1993–1997 Mazda MX-6 LS, or the 1993–2002 Mazda 626 LX or ES, and the Japanese-spec KL-ZE 200 hp (149 kW), found in such vehicles as the Efini MS-8, Xedos 9, and Eunos 800. A 2.0 L V6 KF-ZE is also available, but this swap is quite difficult due to the unavailability of required components. For this reason, this particular engine swap is not often attempted. The GS, apart from the engine has dual tip exhaust, a tighter steering ratio, four disc brakes and front and rear spoiler.
