= List of Mazda model codes =

This list of Mazda model codes describes following model codes which have been used by Mazda since the 1980s.

== Naming scheme ==
The company's model codes form the fourth and fifth characters of the VIN on post-1981 vehicles. The first character is a letter representing the model family, while the second is a sequential letter for subsequent models. For example, the Mazda N family used by the Mazda Miata started at NA and was updated in 1998 to NB and in 2006 to NC. The 2016 and newer MX-5s are designated ND.

Mazda generally starts car model codes at the letter "A", but van and truck variants often get different names, usually starting at "V".

Note: The US-built Mazda6 and Tribute do not use the Mazda model code in the VIN; in its place is an AutoAlliance code. Instead of the model code letter, position four in the VIN specifies the vehicle's safety systems, and position five specifies the marque, due to being built in a multi-brand facility.

=== Old VINs ===
Prior to 1981, Mazda used a different VIN format and model code naming scheme. The model families were given two characters, and the model a third, based on their names.

The following pre-1981 model groups are known:

- M1 - Familia
- S1 - Capella/Savanna
- SA2 - Savanna/RX-7
- LA - Luce
- CD - Cosmo
- PA1/PA2 - Proceed

The next digit of the VIN specified the engine:

- 0 - 10A/10B
- 2 - 12A/12B
- 3 - 13A/13B

== Model codes ==
A codes (for kei cars)
Code	Vehicles	Years	Description
AA	Autozam Carol	1989–1995	Shares platform with Suzuki Alto.
AC	Autozam Carol	1995–1998	Shares platform with Suzuki Alto.

B codes (for compact front-wheel drive cars)
Code	Vehicles	Years	Description
BD	Mazda Familia / Mazda 323 / Mazda GLC	1980–1986	This is the first showing of Mazda's SS (self-stabilizing) rear suspension. The two lower parallel links of the rear strut are designed to induce toe-in on the rear tire on the outer side of the curve (e.g. right turn - left rear tire).
BE	Ford Laser	1981–1985	Rebadged version of BD.
BV	Mazda Familia / Mazda 323 (station wagon)	1981–1986	BV was an updated version of the preceding FA4 generation, sold alongside the newer BD sedan and coupé.
BF	Mazda Familia / Mazda 323 / Mazda Étude / Ford Laser (sedan, hatchback, cabriolet)	1985–2004	The self stabilizing suspension was updated. Basis for Mercury Tracer and Ford/Mercury Capri.
BW	Mazda Familia / Mazda 323 / Ford Laser (station wagon)	1986–1994	BW is a station wagon version of BF.
BG	Mazda Familia / Mazda 323 / Mazda Protegé / Eunos 100 / Ford Laser	1989–2004	Basis for the North American Ford Escort and Mercury Tracer.
BH	Mazda Familia / Ford Laser	1994–2000	
BA	Mazda 323 / Mazda Protegé	1994–2001	
BJ	Mazda Familia / Mazda 323 / Mazda Protegé / Ford Laser Lidea	1998–2002	The BJ was updated with a lower moment of roll for improved steering, better chassis rigidity, and new engines and transmissions.
BK	Mazda3 / Mazda Axela	2003–2014	Used the Ford C1 platform, which was jointly engineered by Mazda, Volvo and Ford.
BL	Mazda3 / Mazda Axela	2009–2013	BL is partially based on the Ford C1 platform, which was jointly engineered by Mazda, Volvo and Ford.
BM	Mazda3 / Mazda Axela	2013–2018	BM rides on the new, clean-sheet SkyActiv chassis architecture. JDM Axela still use BM for facelift model.
BN	Mazda3	2015–2018	BN is the facelifted version of BM. Not applicable for JDM Axela.
BY	Mazda Axela Hybrid	2013–2018	BY is the hybrid version of BM and BN, exclusive to the Japanese market.
BP	Mazda3	2019–present	

C codes (for mid-size front-wheel drive cars) (Note: The C platform is based on Mazda's G platform.)
Code	Vehicles	Years	Description
CA	Mazda Xedos 6 / Eunos 500	1992–1999	The CA was developed for Mazda's new upmarket Eunos brand.
CB	Mazda Lantis / Mazda 323F	1993–1998	Uses a different platform from BH, the other 323 models.
CG	Mazda Capella / Ford Telstar II	1994–1996	CG was very closely related to its predecessors. The CG was designed with a slimmer body than previous models to be marketable in Japan.
CP	Mazda Premacy / Ford Ixion	1999–2002	
CR	Mazda5 / Mazda Premacy	2004–2010	
CC	Mazda Biante	2008–2018	
CW	Mazda5 / Mazda Premacy	2010–2018	

D codes (for subcompact car front-wheel drive cars)
Code	Vehicles	Years	Description
DA	Ford Festiva / Mazda 121	1986–1993	Also badged as the Kia Pride.
DB	Autozam Revue / Mazda 121 / Mazda Revue	1990–1996	
DW	Mazda Demio / Mazda 121 / Ford Festiva Mini Wagon	1996–2002	Based on the DB.
DY	Mazda2 / Mazda Demio	2002–2007	Platform co-engineered with Ford, which uses it as their B1 platform.
DC	Mazda Verisa	2004–2015	Platform co-engineered with Ford, which uses it as their B1 platform.
DE	Mazda2 / Mazda Demio	2007–2014	Platform co-engineered with Ford, which uses it as their B3 platform.
DH	Mazda2 / Mazda Demio	2007–2014	Platform co-engineered with Ford, which uses it as their B3 platform.
DJ	Mazda2 / Mazda Demio (hatchback)	2014–present	
DL	Mazda2 / Mazda Demio (sedan)	2014–present	
DK	Mazda CX-3	2014–present	
DM	Mazda CX-30	2019–present	
DR	Mazda MX-30	2020–present	Based on the DM.

E codes (for mid-size crossovers, originally subcompact front-wheel drive coupes) (Note: The E platform is based on Mazda's B platform.)
Code	Vehicles	Years	Description
EC	Mazda MX-3 / Autozam AZ-3 / Eunos Presso	1991–1997	Based on the BG.
EP	Mazda Tribute / Ford Escape	2000–2012	Uses Ford's CD2 platform, which is based on the GF.
ER	Mazda CX-7	2006–2012	

F codes (for rotary wankel engine sports cars)
Code	Vehicles	Years	Description
FB	Mazda RX-7 / Mazda Savanna RX-7	1981–1985	The FB chassis was a new name for the SA2 used in the 1979–1980 RX-7 VIN.
FC	Mazda RX-7 / Mazda Savanna RX-7	1986–1991	Also served as the basis for the Mazda MX-5's NA's platform.
FD	Mazda RX-7 / ɛ̃fini RX-7	1991–2002	
SE	Mazda RX-8	2003–2011	The SE's platform was the last platform used for a rotary engine-based vehicle. It also served as the basis for the Mazda MX-5 NC's platform.
FE	Mazda RX-8	2003–2011	The SE's platform was the last platform used for a rotary engine-based vehicle. It also served as the basis for the Mazda MX-5 NC's platform.

G codes (for mid-size front-wheel drive cars)
Code	Vehicles	Years	Description
GC	Mazda Capella / Mazda 626 / Ford Telstar	1982–1987	GC used Mazda's first front-wheel drive mid-size car platform. Available body styles were the two-door coupe, four-door sedan, and five-door hatchback. The Ford Telstar hatchback version was called the TX5: there was no Telstar version of the coupe. Production was in Japan, with local assembly in Australia (Telstar only), New Zealand, Taiwan and South Africa, where the model continued in production until 1993.
GD	Mazda Capella / Mazda 626 / Mazda MX-6 / Ford Telstar (sedan, liftback, coupé)	1987–1991	The updated GD was introduced in 1987 in Japan and later elsewhere. It spawned a station wagon variant, the GV. Production in the United States started at the AutoAlliance International plant in Flat Rock, Michigan. Basis for the Ford Probe.
GV	Mazda Capella / Mazda 626 / Ford Telstar (station wagon)	1988–1996	The station wagon and van versions use a modified version of the GD's platform.
GE	Mazda 626 / Mazda Cronos / Mazda MX-6 / ɛ̃fini MS-6 / Autozam Clef / Ford Telstar	1991–1997	The Japanese market Mazda Capella never used the GE's platform. Rather, a new model (the Mazda Cronos) was introduced alongside the Capella, while the Capella continued on an updated version of the GC's platform until 1993 and was then moved to a new platform for the CG from 1994 through 1997. Basis for Ford Probe, Kia Credos and Kia Carnival. As Ford and Mazda shared engineering technologies, the GE's platform is related to the Ford CDW27/CD162/CD132, used for the Ford Mondeo and Jaguar X-Type.
GF	Mazda Capella / Mazda 626 / Ford Telstar (sedan, liftback)	1997–2002	The Capella and 626 were again reunited as the GF in 1997. An updated station wagon version, the GW, was finally introduced as well. See Ford CD2 platform.
GW	Mazda Capella / Mazda 626 / Ford Telstar (station wagon)	1997–2002	The station wagon and van versions use a modified version of the GF's platform.
GG	Mazda6 / Mazda Atenza (sedan, liftback)	2002–2007	American-built Mazda6s use the "1YV" prefix on the VIN. See Ford CD3 platform. The rear multi-link suspension is remarkably similar to the "E type" found in the HC's platform. Although also similar to Ford's own design, Mazda engineers said this is a revival of the "E type" multi-link. Basis for Besturn B70.
GY	Mazda6 / Mazda Atenza (station wagon)	2002–2007	GY is a station wagon version of GG.
GH	Mazda6 / Mazda Atenza (sedan, liftback)	2007–2016	Introduced in 2008, GH uses a retuned and revised version of the preceding GG chassis. See Ford CD3 platform. The code GH is also used for the first generation Mazda CX-5, though it primarily uses KE.
GZ	Mazda6 / Mazda Atenza (station wagon)	2007–2012	GZ is a station wagon version of GH.
GJ	Mazda6 / Mazda Atenza	2012–2015	Basis for the Hongqi H5.
GL	Mazda6 / Mazda Atenza	2016–2024	GL is a refreshed version of GJ.
GK	Mazda CX-4	2016–2025	

H codes (for full-size rear-wheel drive cars) (Note: The Mazda Carol HB, Mazda Spiano HF and Mazda Laputa HP use the Suzuki H platform, not the Mazda H platform.)
Code	Vehicles	Years	Description
HB	Mazda Luce / Mazda 929 / Mazda Cosmo	1981–1989	The HB was introduced in 1981 as the Mazda Cosmo coupe and Mazda Luce/929 sedan. The Luce was updated in 1986, with the 929 following the next year for some markets, but the Cosmo continued on until 1989.
HV	Mazda Luce Legato / Mazda 929L (station wagon)	1983–1987	HV was an updated version of the preceding LA4 generation, sold alongside the newer HB sedan and coupé.
HC	Mazda Luce / Mazda 929	1986–1991	A new Mazda Luce/929 sedan appeared in 1986 as the HC. The export-version 929 lagged for some markets, and the HB Cosmo continued unchanged.
HD	Mazda Sentia / Mazda 929 / ɛ̃fini MS-9	1991–1995	The Luce nameplate was retired in favor of Sentia, but the H codes continued with the 1991 HD revision.
HE	Mazda Sentia / Mazda 929	1995–1998	Export of the 929 was halted after the HD, and the ɛ̃fini marque was gone as well, but the Mazda Sentia continued for one more generation.

J codes (for full-size rear-wheel drive cars) (Note: The J platform is the basis for the Eunos Cosmo GT car.) (Note: The Mazda AZ-Offroad JM uses the Suzuki keicar platform, not the Mazda J platform.)
Code	Vehicles	Years	Description
JC	Eunos Cosmo	1990–1995	The JC uses a totally new platform developed for 1990s and is unique to the JC Cosmo. Its closest cousin is the HD-929 from 1991 to 1995. It was a major update from the previous HB Cosmo's platform.

K codes (for crossovers)
Code	Vehicles	Years	Description
KE	Mazda CX-5	2012–2017	
KF	Mazda CX-5	2017–2025	
KG	Mazda CX-8	2018–present	KG is a long-wheelbase variant of KF.
KH	Mazda CX-60	2022–present	
KJ	Mazda CX-70	2024–present	2-row version of KK.
KL	Mazda CX-80	2024–present	
KK	Mazda CX-90	2023–present	
KM	Mazda CX-5	2025- present	

L codes (for front-wheel drive minivans) (Note: The L platform is the basis for the Mazda MPV family.)
Code	Vehicles	Years	Description
LV	Mazda MPV / ɛ̃fini MPV	1988–1995	The LV uses a rear-wheel drive platform with an all-wheel drive option, based on the Mazda Luce HC.
LW	Mazda MPV	1996–2006	The LW uses a front-wheel drive platform with an all-wheel drive option in some markets, based on the Mazda Capella GF.
LY	Mazda8 / Mazda MPV	2006–2016	The LY uses a front-wheel drive platform with an all-wheel drive option in the Japanese market, based on the Mazda Atenza Sport Wagon GY.

M codes (for mid-size front-wheel drive cars) (Note: The Mazda AZ-Wagon MD uses the Suzuki M platform, not the Mazda M platform.)
Code	Vehicles	Years
MA	Mazda Persona / Eunos 300	1988–1992
MB	ɛ̃fini MS-8	1992–1995

N codes (for front mid-engine, rear-wheel-drive sports cars)
Code	Vehicles	Years	Description
NA	Mazda MX-5 / Eunos Roadster / Mazda Miata	1989–1997	The NA utilized many components in-house, such as the 323/Familia/Protegé engine and 323 GTX differential (1.6L), RX-7 FC (non-turbo) differential (1.8L) and transmission, but the chassis was unique.
NB	Mazda MX-5 / Mazda Roadster / Mazda MX-5 Miata	1998–2005	The NB was very close to the NA mechanically. Most changes were related to the vehicle systems, including electrical wiring and a new generation of the Mazda B engine.
NC	Mazda MX-5 / Mazda Roadster / Mazda MX-5 Miata	2006–2015	The NC utilized a shortened version of the SE RX-8's platform. Many suspension and braking components are interchangeable with the RX-8, while some interior components are shared with the Mazda6, Mazda3 and CX-7.
ND	Mazda MX-5 / Mazda Roadster / Mazda MX-5 Miata	2016–present	ND uses a new platform for the fourth generation of the MX-5.
NF	Fiat 124 Spider / Abarth 124 Spider / Abarth 124 GT	2017–2020	NF uses a variant of the ND's platform for the 2016 Fiat 124 Spider. While the platform design is similar, the sheet metal and drivetrain are completely different, using the Fiat 1.4 MultiAir turbo 4 cylinder and an updated Mazda NC 6-speed manual transmission.
NFM	Fiat 124 Spider / Abarth 124 Spider / Abarth 124 GT	2017–2020	NF uses a variant of the ND's platform for the 2016 Fiat 124 Spider. While the platform design is similar, the sheet metal and drivetrain are completely different, using the Fiat 1.4 MultiAir turbo 4 cylinder and an updated Mazda NC 6-speed manual transmission.
NE	Abarth 124 Spider	2017–2020	Abarth models were originally assigned NE in the VIN before switching to the NF code used by Fiat models.

P codes (for mid-engine kei cars)
Code	Vehicles	Years
PG	Autozam AZ-1 / Suzuki Cara	1992–1995

S codes (for vans)
Code	Vehicles	Years	Description
SE	Mazda Bongo / Mazda E-Series / Eunos Cargo / Ford Spectron / Ford J80	1986–1999	The code SE is also used on the Mazda RX-8.
SS	Mazda Bongo / Mazda E-Series / Eunos Cargo / Ford Spectron / Ford J80	1986–1999	
SV	Mazda Bongo / Mazda E-Series / Eunos Cargo / Ford Spectron / Ford J80	1994–2000	
SD	Mazda Bongo Brawny / Mazda E-Series / Ford J100	1987–2009	Enlarged variant of SE/SS/SV.
SR	Mazda Bongo Brawny / Mazda E-Series / Ford J100	1987–2009	Enlarged variant of SE/SS/SV.
SG	Mazda Bongo Friendee / Ford Freda	1995–2002	
SY	Mazda Titan Dash	2000–2010	SY is a lighter duty 1-ton version of WH.
SK	Mazda Bongo / Mazda Bongo Brawny / Mazda E-Series	1999–2016	Based on the SS.
SL	Mazda Bongo / Mazda E-Series	2016–2020	The SL is a minor update of SK.

T codes (for mid-size models)
Code	Vehicles	Years
TA	Mazda Millenia / Mazda Xedos 9 / Eunos 800	1995–2003
TB	Mazda CX-9	2006–2015
TC	Mazda CX-9	2016–2024

U codes (for pickup trucks)
Code	Vehicles	Years	Description
UC	Mazda B-Series / Mazda Proceed	1981–1985	Designated before 1981 as PE under the old naming scheme.
UD	Mazda B-Series / Mazda Proceed	1981–1985	Designated before 1981 as PE under the old naming scheme.
UE	Mazda B-Series		
UF	Mazda B-Series / Mazda Proceed	1985–1998	
UV	Mazda Proceed Marvie / Ford Raider	1991–1996	UN based SUV.
UN	Mazda B-Series / Mazda Fighter	1998–2006	
UN	Mazda BT-50	2006–2011	The UN code was kept over from the fifth generation B-Series it replaced.
CD	Mazda BT-50	2006–2011	
UP	Mazda BT-50	2011–2014	Based on the Ford Ranger.
UR	Mazda BT-50	2015–2020	UR is the facelifted version of UP.
TF	Mazda BT-50	2020–present	Based on the Isuzu D-Max.

V codes (for compact crossovers)
	Vehicles	Years
VA	Mazda CX-50	2022–present

W codes (for large cabover vehicles)
Code	Vehicles	Years	Description
WE	Mazda Titan / Mazda T-Series / Ford Trader	1987–1989	
WG	Mazda Titan / Mazda T-Series / Ford Trader	1989–1999	Minor refresh.
WV	Mazda Parkway	1987–1995	WE based Bus
WH	Mazda Titan / Mazda T-Series	2000–2004	

== See also ==
- List of Mazda vehicles
- List of Mazda engines
