= Mazda B engine =

Overview
- Manufacturer: Mazda
- Production: 1985–2005

Layout
- Configuration: Inline-four engine
- Displacement: 1,138 cc (69.4 cu in); 1,290 cc (79 cu in); 1,324 cc (80.8 cu in); 1,498 cc (91.4 cu in); 1,597 cc (97.5 cu in); 1,839 cc (112.2 cu in); 1,995 cc (121.7 cu in)
- Cylinder bore: 68.0 mm (2.68 in); 71.0 mm (2.80 in); 78.0 mm (3.07 in); 83.0 mm (3.27 in)
- Piston stroke: 67.5 mm (2.66 in); 78.4 mm (3.09 in); 83.6 mm (3.29 in); 85.0 mm (3.35 in); 90 mm (3.5 in)
- Cylinder block material: Cast iron
- Cylinder head material: Aluminum
- Valvetrain: SOHC; DOHC

Combustion
- Fuel type: Gasoline
- Oil system: Wet sump
- Cooling system: Water-cooled

Chronology
- Successor: Mazda Z engine; Mazda L engine

The Mazda B-series is a small-sized, iron-block, inline four-cylinder engine with belt-driven SOHC and DOHC valvetrain ranging in displacement from 1.1 to 1.8 litres. It was used in a wide variety of applications, from front-wheel drive economy vehicles to the turbocharged full-time 4WD 323 GTX and rear-wheel drive Miata.

The B-series is a "non-interference" design, meaning that breakage of its timing belt does not result in damage to valves or pistons, because the opening of the valves, the depth of the combustion chamber and (in some variants) the shaping of the piston crown allow sufficient clearance for the open valves in any possible piston position.

== 1.1 liters ==
=== B1 ===
1.1 L (1,138 cc) B1 - (68.0x78.4 mm) - came only as a SOHC 8-valve. It was available in the 1987–1989 Mazda 121 and later model Kia Sephia in European and Asian markets. A fuel-injected variant was used in select European market 1991–1995 Mazda 121s

== 1.3 liters ==
=== BJ ===
The 1.3 L (1,290 cc) BJ engine (78.0x67.5 mm) was a DOHC 16-valve engine, used only in the Japanese market Ford Festiva GT, GT-X, and GT-A models (1986.10–1993.01, GT-A from March 1991). It generates 88 PS (65 kW) at 7000 rpm and is equipped with Mazda's "EGi" single-point fuel injection. It is a short-stroke version of the B5/B6 engines.

=== B3 ===
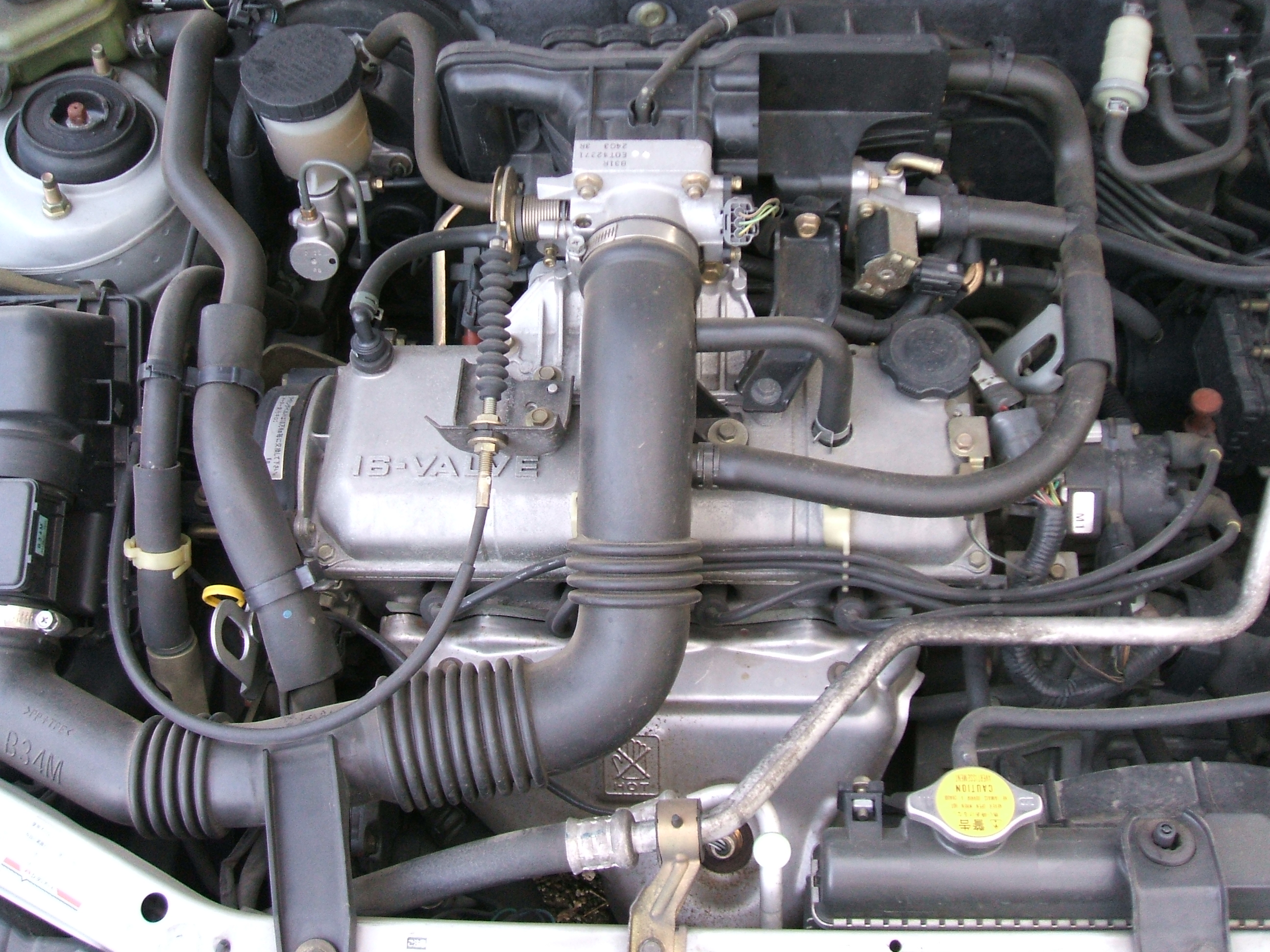
Mazda B3E

1.3 L (1,324 cc) B3 – (71.0×83.6 mm). It was available in SOHC variants and was found in the Kia-built 1988–1993 Ford Festiva, the 1987–1989 Mazda Familia and its derivatives, as well as the Mazda 121 (also known as Autozam Revue) in 54 and 72 PS (40 and 53 kW) versions, and the 1987–1989 Ford Laser, and 1994–1997 Ford Aspire. Later variants were used in the Mazda Demio subcompact until 2002.

Fuel Injected Engine: Horsepower: 64 PS (47 kW) at 5000 rpm Torque: 73 lb⋅ft (99 N⋅m) at 3000 rpm

Carbureted Engine: Horsepower: 64–68 PS (47–50 kW)

Later versions (Mazda 323 91–98 etc.) produced 73 PS (54 kW) at 5500 rpm, and 104 N⋅m (77 lb⋅ft) of torque at 3700 rpm

- 1988–2000 Ford Festiva/Mazda 121
- 1985–2020 Kia Pride
- Autozam Revue/Mazda 121
- 1986–1989 Mazda Familia/323
- 1995–2002 Mazda Demio
- 1994–1997 Ford Aspire/Kia Avella
- 1987–1989 Ford Laser
- 1991–1993 Sao Penza
- 2000–2005 Kia Rio

== 1.5 liters ==
=== B5 ===
		Power			Torque				Norm	Fuel system	Fitment	Markets
		PS	kW	at rpm	kgm	Nm	lbft	at rpm	Norm	Fuel system	Fitment	Markets
8V SOHC	B5	76	56	6,000	11.4	112	82	3,500	JIS net	carb	1987–1989 Familia BF/Ford Laser KE, 1987–1994 Familia BF Wagon, 1988.07–1989.02 Mazda Étude	JDM, NZ
8V SOHC	B5	73	54	5,700	11.4	112	82	3,200	ECE	carb	Familia BF Wagon	EU
8V SOHC	B5	82	60	5,500	12.2	120	88	2,500		carb	Timor S515	RI
8V SOHC	B5	88	65	5,000	13.8	135	100	4,000	DIN	EGI	1992–1997 2nd gen. Ford Festiva	Aus
16V SOHC	B5-M	91	67	6,500	12.4	122	90	4,000	JIS net	carb	1989.02–1991.01 Familia BG, 1989–1994 Ford Laser KF/KH	JDM, NZ
16V SOHC	B5-MI	88	65	6,500	12.0	118	87	4,000	JIS net	EGI-S	1991–1998 Autozam Revue	JDM
16V SOHC	B5-MI	94	69	6,500	12.5	123	90	4,000	JIS net	EGI-S	1990.02–1994.06 Familia BG	JDM
16V SOHC	B5-ME	80	59	5,500	12.2	120	88	2,500	ECE	EGI	1992–1997 Kia Sephia	EU
16V SOHC	B5-ME	88	65	5,500	13.5	132	98	2,500	JIS net KS	EGI	1992–1994 Kia Sephia	RoK, others
16V SOHC	B5-ME	92	68	5,500	13.5	132	98	2,500	JIS net KS	EGI	1992–1994 Kia Sephia	RoK, others
16V SOHC	B5-ME	100	74	6,300	12.1	119	88	5,000	JIS net KS	EGI	1993–2000 Ford Festiva/Kia Avella	JDM, RoK, others
16V SOHC	B5-ME	100	74	6,000	13.0	127	94	4,500	JIS net	EGI	1996–2002 Demio/Ford Festiva Mini Wagon	JDM
16V DOHC	B5-DE	105	77	5,500	15.0	147	108	4,000	KS	EGI	1992–2000 Kia Sephia, 1992–1997 Timor S515i DOHC, 2000–2005 Kia Rio	RoK, RI, others
16V DOHC	B5-DE	110	81	6,500	12.9	127	93	5,500	JIS net	EGI	1989–1991.08 Familia BG and Astina, 1989–1994 Ford Laser KF/KH	JDM
16V DOHC	B5-DE	115	85	6,500	13.5	132	98	5,000	JIS net	EGI	1991.08–1994 Familia BG and Astina with AT	JDM
16V DOHC	B5-DE	120	88	6,500	13.5	132	98	5,500	JIS net	EGI	1991.08–1994 Familia BG and Astina with MT	JDM

==== 8-valve SOHC ====
1.5 L (1,498 cc) B5 - (78.0x78.4 mm) - The SOHC 8-valve B5 upped the displacement to 1.5 liters and was found in the 1987–1989 Mazda Familia and the 1987–1989 Ford Laser. It was also fitted to the Mazda Étude coupé and fifth-generation BF-series Familia Wagon, as it continued in production until 1994 along the new BG.

==== 16-valve SOHC ====
There was also a 16-valve, SOHC B5-MI version of the B5, usually fitted with single-point fuel injection ("EGi"). This engine was mainly used in the Japanese domestic market. The B5-ME, equipped with electronic fuel injection, was used by Kia for several of their cars as well as in the Mazda Demio.

==== 16-valve DOHC ====
1.5 L (1,498 cc) B5D - (78.0x78.4 mm) - A Japanese-only variant of the B5 with fuel injection and revised head/intake system. Found in the 1989–1994 BG Familia and Ford Laser S. Power output is 120 PS (88 kW) at 6,500 rpm and 13.5 kg⋅m (132 N⋅m; 98 lb⋅ft) at 5,500 rpm. The Timor S515i also used a B5D, with 110 PS (81 kW) at 5,500 rpm and 145 Nm at 4,400 rpm without variable valve timing and with a 9.2:1 compression ratio. The B5D was also found in the Autozam AZ-3, a Japanese market version of the Mazda MX-3, where it produces 120 PS (88 kW). The Kia Rio from 2000 to 2005 also has a B5 variant, but with a different bore/stroke ratio from all others (75.5 mm bore, 83.4 mm stroke, 1493 cc total). This motor produced 100 PS (74 kW) and 135 N⋅m (100 lb⋅ft).

- Later Eunos Presso and Familia 'Interplay X' versions (1994 on) have a B5-ZE engine which produces 125 PS (92 kW) at 7,000 rpm and 13.2 kg⋅m (129 N⋅m; 95 lb⋅ft) at 6,000 rpm This was also installed in the Japanese market "Ford Laser"-badged versions of the Familia.

== 1.6 liters ==
=== B6 ===
1.6 L (1,597 cc) B6 — (78.0x83.6 mm) — This was a bored-out version of the B3. The 16-valve SOHC B6 was found in the 1985–1989 and 1990–1994 Mazda 323, 1991–1993 Mazda MX-3 the 1987–1990 Mercury Tracer, and the 1985–1990 Ford Laser. The 16-valve DOHC B6 was also found in the 1994–1998 Ford Laser KJ/KL, 1997–2004 Kia Sephia, Kia Shuma, 2000–2004 Kia Spectra and 2000–2005 Kia Rio (for export markets).

In Japan, the United Kingdom, and Australia a fuel-injected version called the B6F was available. In Europe, the B6 also came in a 16-valve SOHC version, mostly found in the Mazda 323 BG and 323F BG models from 1989 to 1994. This engine was the same 1.6 liter fuel-injected and 88 hp. Kia's version of the B6 (16-valve DOHC) had a marginally shorter stroke (at 83.4 mm), for a total displacement of 1,594 cc. This engine was used in the Rio, Sephia II, and Shuma.

8-valve SOHC

- 1985–1989 and 1990–1994 Mazda 323
- 1994–1996 Kia Sephia (for export markets only: DE, USA)
- 1987–1990 Mercury Tracer
- 1985–1990 Ford Laser KC/KE 323

16-valve SOHC

- 1991–1993 Mazda MX-3
- 1989–1994 Mazda 323 BG
- 1989–1994 Mazda 323F BG/Mazda Astina BG
- 1989–1994 Ford Laser KF/KH

16-valve DOHC

- 1989–1993 Mazda Miata
- 1993–1999 Mazda Xedos 6
- 2000–2005 Kia Rio (for export markets only)
- 1997–2003 Mazda Familia/ Mazda Etude (South Africa)
- 1991–1994 Mercury Capri (USDM)

=== B6-2E ===
1.6 L (1,597 cc) B6-2E - (78.0x83.6 mm), also known as B6-ME - This was a variant of the B6-E with a SOHC, 16-valve cylinder head.

=== B6T ===
1.6 L (1,597 cc) B6T - (78.0x83.6 mm) - The ubiquitous turbocharged, fuel-injected and intercooled 16-valve DOHC B6, released in 1985 and used in numerous models worldwide including the 1985–1989 Mazda Familia BFMR/BFMP (turbo), 1985–1989 Ford Laser TX3 turbo, and 1991–1994 Mercury Capri XR2. This engine was most commonly found mated to a 4WD drivetrain although FWD models were also available.

Power and torque outputs varied across markets due to emission and fuel standards. The B6T available in North America came with 132 hp (98 kW) and 136 lb⋅ft (184 N⋅m). The Japanese version was slightly more powerful, producing 140 PS (103 kW) and 19.0 kg⋅m (186 N⋅m) due to better intake manifold design and its ability to run 100 octane fuel. For the special rally homologation BFMR Familia GT-Ae model released in 1987, power and torque were raised to 150 PS (110 kW) and 20.0 kg⋅m (196 N⋅m) respectively through the use of a slightly different turbocharger; engine internals remained otherwise identical.

=== B6D ===
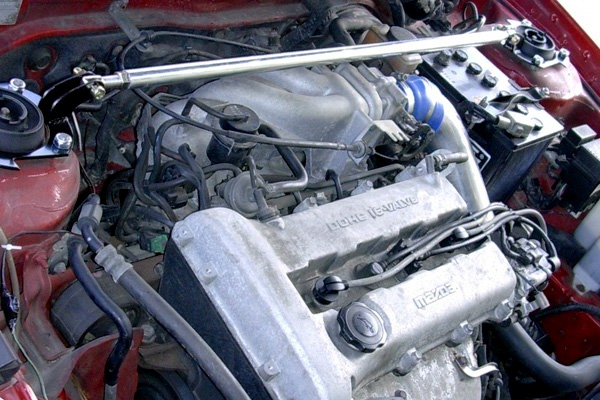
Mazda B6D, 3rd generation

1.6 L (1,597 cc) B6D - (78.0x83.6 mm) - The same strengthened and fuel-injected 16-valve DOHC B6 but with higher compression, no turbo, and the first Mazda engine to feature Variable Inertia Charge System (VICS). Most commonly found in the 1985–1988 Japanese market Familias, Études and Lasers, this engine was updated in 1989 with revised compression, heads and intake system (in a similar vein to the B5 DOHC) for the 1989–1991 Familia and Laser, then further refined for the 1991–1994 Mercury Capri and 1994 to 1996, second Generation Mazda MX-3 RS. The third-generation B6D features an alloy cam cover, a VLIM (VICS) intake, had a 9:1 compression ratio and produced 107 hp (79 kW).

- 1989–91 Mazda Familia
- 1991–1994 Mercury Capri
- 1994–96 Mazda MX-3
- 1994–1996 Ford Laser
- 1985–1988 Ford Laser, Études, Mazda Familia
- 1995–1997 Kia Sephia

=== B6ZE(RS) ===
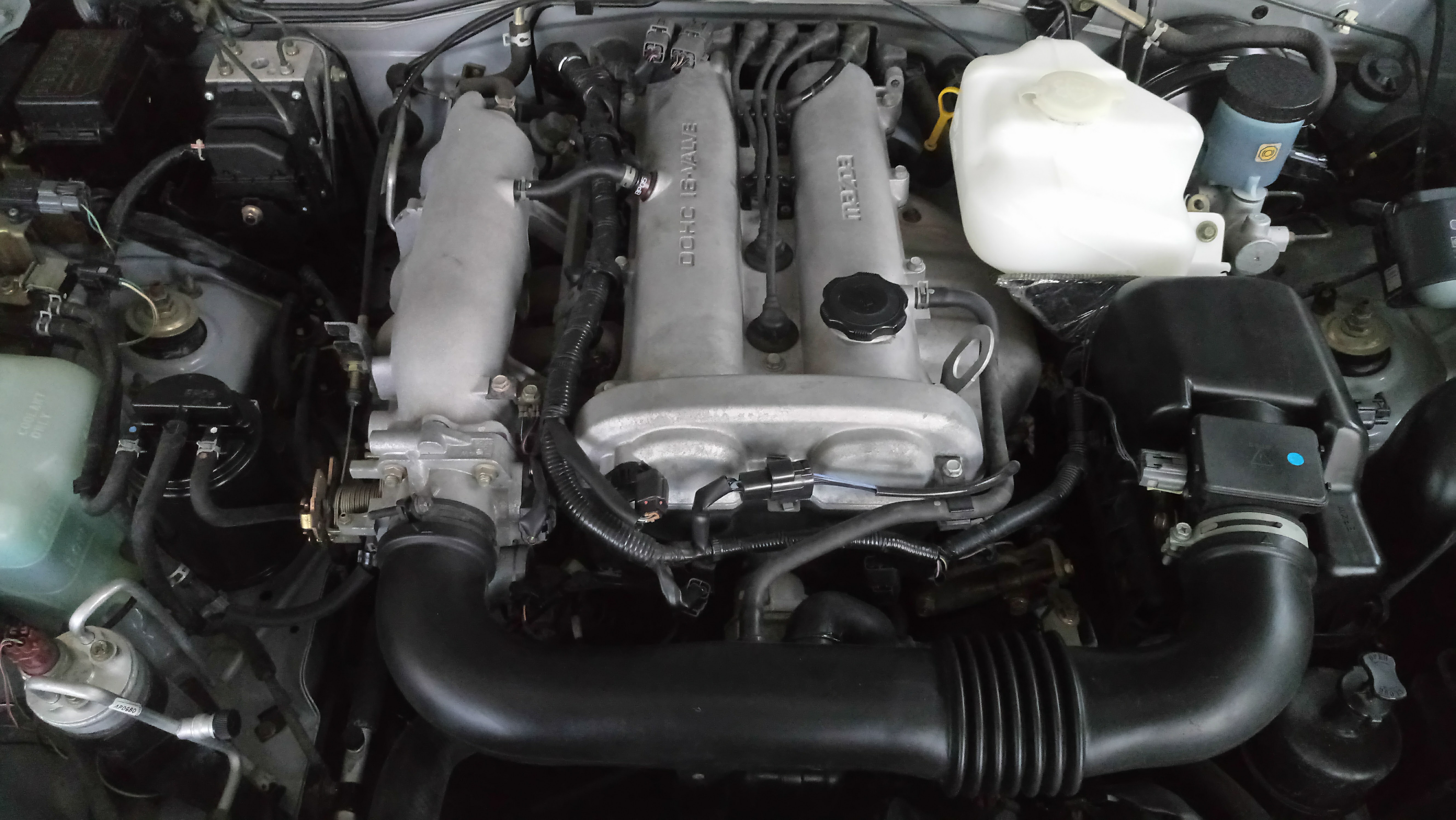
B6ZE(RS)

1.6 L (1,597 cc) B6ZE(RS) - (78x83.6 mm) - Developed for the Mazda MX-5/Miata (1989–05) and Mazda Familia sedan GS/LS Full Time 4WD (JP only, 1994–1998). The engine uses a DOHC 16-valve alloy head with a lightened crankshaft and flywheel to allow a 7,200 rpm redline. An aluminum sump with cooling fins is an unusual feature of this engine. The US and European version (1990–1993) had a 9.4:1 compression ratio and produced 115 hp (85 kW) at 6,500 rpm, and 136 N⋅m (100 lb⋅ft) of torque at 5,500 rpm. The later European version (1994–1997) produced 90 hp (66 kW) at 6,500 rpm, and 129 N⋅m (95 lb⋅ft) at 5,500 rpm. It was then updated to 110 hp (81 kW) at 6,500 rpm and 134 N⋅m (99 lb⋅ft) at 5,000 rpm for the models from 1998 to 2005. The Japanese version of the engine also had a 9.4:1 compression ratio and produced 120 hp (88 kW) at 6,500 rpm and 136 N⋅m (100 lb⋅ft) at 5,500 rpm. After 1998 the power was increased to 125 hp (92 kW) at 6,500 rpm and 143 N⋅m (105 lb⋅ft) at 5,000 rpm.

== 1.7 liter diesel ==
=== PN27 ===
1.7 L (1,720 cc) PN27 - (78x90 mm) The PN27 is a 1720cc B6 based diesel motor used in the 1986–1989 Mazda Familia.

=== PN46 ===
1.7 L (1,720 cc) PN46 - (78x90 mm) The PN46 is a 1720cc B6 based diesel motor used in the 1987–1989 Mazda Familia

== 1.8 liters ==
=== B8 ===
The 1.8 L (1,839 cc) B8 (sometimes "BP") is not just a bored and stroked B6. Rather, it uses a new block with widened cylinder spacing. The bore is 83 mm and the stroke is 85 mm. This SOHC engine was used in various Australian Mazda 323s, the American 1990–1994 Mazda Protegé, and in Canadian variants of the 323 hatchback. It came with four valves per cylinder (B8-ME or BP-ME). It features hydraulic lash adjusters, a belt-driven cam, an 8.9:1 compression ratio, a 6,000 rpm redline, and multi-port fuel injection. Power outputs are:

- 103 hp (77 kW), 111 lb-ft (U.S./Canadian market)
- 106 PS (78 kW) at 5,300 rpm, 151 N⋅m (111 lb⋅ft) at 4,000 rpm (European markets)

=== BP ===
The 1,839 cc (1.8 L) BP, featuring a bore x stroke of 83 mm × 85 mm (3.27 in × 3.35 in), is a DOHC 4 valves per cylinder variant of the B8. This Inline-four engine was called BP-ZE by Mazda engineers and featured a forged crankshaft, piston oil squirters, a structural aluminium oil pan with cooling fins, a 7,000 rpm redline, and Variable Inertia Charging System (VICS) which is activated by a control solenoid at high rpm to increase horsepower in the upper rev range. The engine in base form on 91 RON fuel produces 96 kW (131 PS; 129 bhp) at 6,000 rpm and 165 N⋅m (122 lbf⋅ft) at 4,000 rpm. The engine is a favourite for both N/A and turbo motoring enthusiasts for its robust design, materials and construction. This particular variant can be found in the following vehicles:

- 1989–1994 Mazda Familia GT (Japanese Market)
- 1989–1994 Ford Laser TX3 (Australian Market)
- 1994–1998 Ford Laser KJ GLXi (Australian Market)
- 1994–1998 Mazda Artis "LX" VICS jm1 (South America Market)
- 1990–1994 Mazda Protegé LX (with VICS)
- 1995–1998 Mazda Protegé ES (Australian Market: 1994–1998 323 Protegé SE)
- 1990 Mazda Infini
- 1990–1991 and 1993 Mazda Protegé GT (Canadian Market)
- 1990–1993 Mazda 323 (European Market)
- 1991–1996 Ford Escort GT and LX-E
- 1991–1996 Mercury Tracer LTS
- 1995–1997 Kia Sephia RS, LS, GS
- 1994–1998 Mazda Familia (Japanese Market)
- 1994–1998 Mazda Lantis
- 1994–1997 Mazda MX-5/Miata (did not have VICS until 1999)
- 1997 Ford Laser Ghia

There is also a non-performance SOHC version that is most easily recognized by its black stamped-steel oil pan. It also features a cast crankshaft, no oil squirters, a plastic oil pickup tube and less aggressive camshafts. It is found in the 1995–1998 Mazda Protege ES.

==== BPT ====
Mazda BPT - Turbocharged 1.8L

The BPT is a turbocharged and intercooled variant of the BP. It produced 180 PS (132 kW) at 6,000 rpm and 24.2 kg⋅m (237 N⋅m; 175 lb⋅ft) of torque at 4,000 rpm in JDM-spec from G7+ CJ26 AH7 crankshaft. 95 octane rated European models only claimed 166 PS (122 kW) at 5,500 rpm and 219 N⋅m (162 lb⋅ft) at 3,000 rpm.

It featured an IHI RHB5 VJ20 turbocharger, sidemount intercooler, 330 cc blacktop injectors (high impedance). The BPT versions of the Familia and Laser were only available in AWD models, and featured a viscous LSD centre and rear differentials.

Applications:

- 1989–1994 Mazda Familia GT-X (Japan)
- 1989–1994 Ford Laser TX3 turbo (Australia)
- 1989–1994 Mazda 323 GT
- 1989–1994 Ford Laser GT-X

==== BPD ====
The mazda BPD engine (also commonly referred to as a BP2) was a revamp of the original BP engine (sometimes called BP1 for clarity's sake). It featured a larger crank nose, larger piston oil squirters, a main bearing support plate, better flowing inlet and exhaust ports. This was also the base engine for the Mazda Familia GT-R and GT-Ae. It is commonly known as the 'big turbo' variant as it utilised a much larger IHI RHF6CB water-cooled turbocharger (vj23). The BPD was used as the basis for the engine, with changes such as sodium-filled exhaust valves, larger (and front-mounted) intercooler, larger (440 cc) low impedance fuel injectors and stronger engine internals helping to up the performance of the engine to produce 209 hp (156 kW) and 184 lb·ft (255 N·m). The VICS system of the N/A BP has been removed, as well as the boost cut from the ecu. This engine was designed to power Mazda to a world rally championship win, and was thus used in the limited production Mazda Familia GT-R (2,200 built) and GTAe (300 built).

==== BP-4W ====
The 1998 Roadster uses a modified BP, the BP-4W, which replaces the old hall effect dual Cam Angle Sensor unit mounted at the back of the exhaust cam with two separate Hall Effect units at the front - one on the intake cam gear and one mounted on the oil pump, to the side of the crankshaft pulley. It also has an improved intake system (a better flowing cylinder head because of the angle of the intake ports being changed). There was also a switch from the earlier problematic hydraulic lifters to solid lifters. The engine initially produced 140 hp at 6500 rpm, and 119 lb·ft at 5000 rpm. The United States 2004–2005 Mazdaspeed MX-5 turbo is based on this engine rather than the newer BP-Z3 and produces 178 bhp (180 PS; 133 kW) at 6000 rpm and 226 N⋅m; 166 lbf⋅ft (23 kg⋅m) of torque at 4500 rpm with slightly reduced compression ratio of 9.5:1. The Mazdaspeed turbo engine has no VICS, but does have VTCS which is often mistaken to be related to VICS.

Applications:

- 1998–2000 Mazda MX-5/Roadster/Miata
- 2004–2005 Mazdaspeed MX-5

==== BP-Z3 ====
In 2001, Mazda introduced the still 1.8 L (1,839 cc) BP-Z3 (also called BP-VE) variant of the BP engine. It features S-VT variable valve timing on the intake side, no more VICS, but there is Variable Tumble Control System (VTCS) in the BP-Z3. A similar looking but effectively very different set of valves that restrict the intake on cold start for emissions purposes, rather than the torque enhancing set of partial butterflies that increase velocity that are used in VICS. This was found in the 2001+ Miata. The Z family is an evolution of this engine.

In Australia, a turbocharged version of this engine produced 157 kW (211 hp) and 280 N⋅m (207 lb⋅ft) in the Mazda MX-5 SP.

== See also ==
- Mazda engines

== References, links ==
- 1981–1994 Ford Laser engine guide (applies to Mazda Familia as well)
