= Mazda Étude =

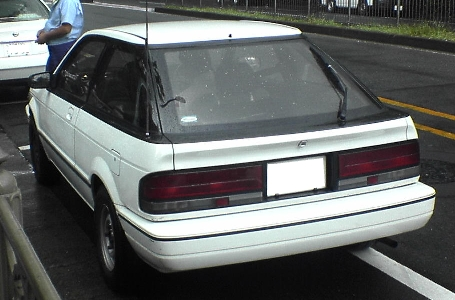

Overview
- Model code: BF
- Production: 1987.01–1989.02
- Assembly: Hofu, Japan

Body and chassis
- Class: Sport compact
- Body style: 3-door coupé
- Layout: FF layout
- Related: Mazda Familia

Powertrain
- Engine: 1498 cc B5 I4; 1597 cc B6D DOHC I4
- Transmission: 5-speed manual (1.5/1.6); 3-speed automatic (1.5); 4-speed automatic (1.6)

Dimensions
- Wheelbase: 2,400 mm (94.5 in)
- Length: 4,105 mm (161.6 in)
- Width: 1,645 mm (64.8 in)
- Height: 1,355 mm (53.3 in)
- Curb weight: 980 kg (2,161 lb)

Chronology
- Successor: Autozam AZ-3/Eunos Presso; Mazda Familia Astina

The Mazda Étude is a three-door hatchback coupé version of the fifth-generation Familia that was only ever marketed by Mazda in Japan, from 1987 to 1989. The name was also later used in South Africa for the sixth generation Familia.

== History ==
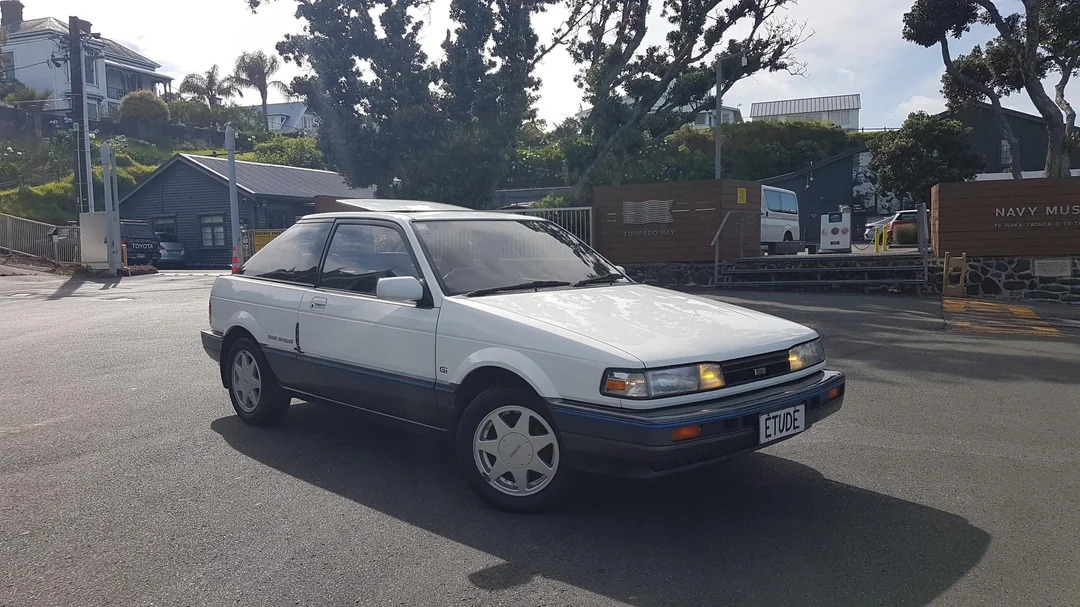
Mazda Étude

The Étude shared design cues and was constructed from the same BF platform as the 323/Familia, but was a bit longer and had a 45mm lower roofline, providing a generally lower, sleeker appearance. It was marketed as a "personal coupé" and came standard with very full equipment (sliding sunroof, two-tone paint, power steering and windows, etc.) coupled with a more comfort oriented suspension than did sedans. The B- and C-pillars were blacked out and the greenhouse had an entirely flush surface, helping to differentiate it from its more staid siblings. This styling feature was called "Terraceback" by Mazda.

The car was first introduced in January 1987 with the 1.6-liter twin cam engine in three different trim levels, from the bottom Li via the Si to the top Gi spec. Ironically the car lived up to the meaning of its name "Étude: a short musical composition, designed as an exercise to improve the technique or demonstrate the skill of the player." Target sales were 2,000 per month, but in the eleven months it was on sale in 1987 only about 6,000 made it onto the market. A lesser 1.5-litre base version (1.5 Sa) was added in July 1988, at which time a number of brighter colours were also added to the existing silver and white options. The Sa's spec was midway between the Li and Si. Nominally a five-seater, the rear seat was clearly only designed to be comfortable for two.

Although Mazda had gone to some lengths to try to differentiate the car from the regular Familia, the interior in particular felt less than special. When the Familia was redesigned in March, 1989, the Étude ended production, but sales of remaining stock continued for a while. When it finally disappeared without fanfare, just under 10,000 had been built. The car's de facto successors were the Mazda Familia Astina (323F) and Autozam AZ-3/Eunos Presso coupés (known as the Mazda MX-3 in export markets).

== Engines ==
- 1988-1989 - 1.5 L (1,498 cc) B5 SOHC I4, carburetted, 76 PS (56 kW; 75 hp) at 6,000 rpm. 11.4 kg⋅m (112 N⋅m) at 3,500 rpm
- 1987-1989 - 1.6 L (1,597 cc) B6D DOHC I4, EFi, 110 PS (81 kW; 108 hp) at 6,500 rpm. 13.5 kg⋅m (132 N⋅m) at 4,500 rpm
