= Ford Aspire =

The Ford Aspire nameplate has been used by the American automobile manufacturer Ford for the following cars, in the following markets:

- Ford Festiva, in North America and Thailand from 1993 to 1997
- The sedan version of the Ford Figo, a rebadged third generation Ford Ka in India since 2015
