= Mazda Z engine =

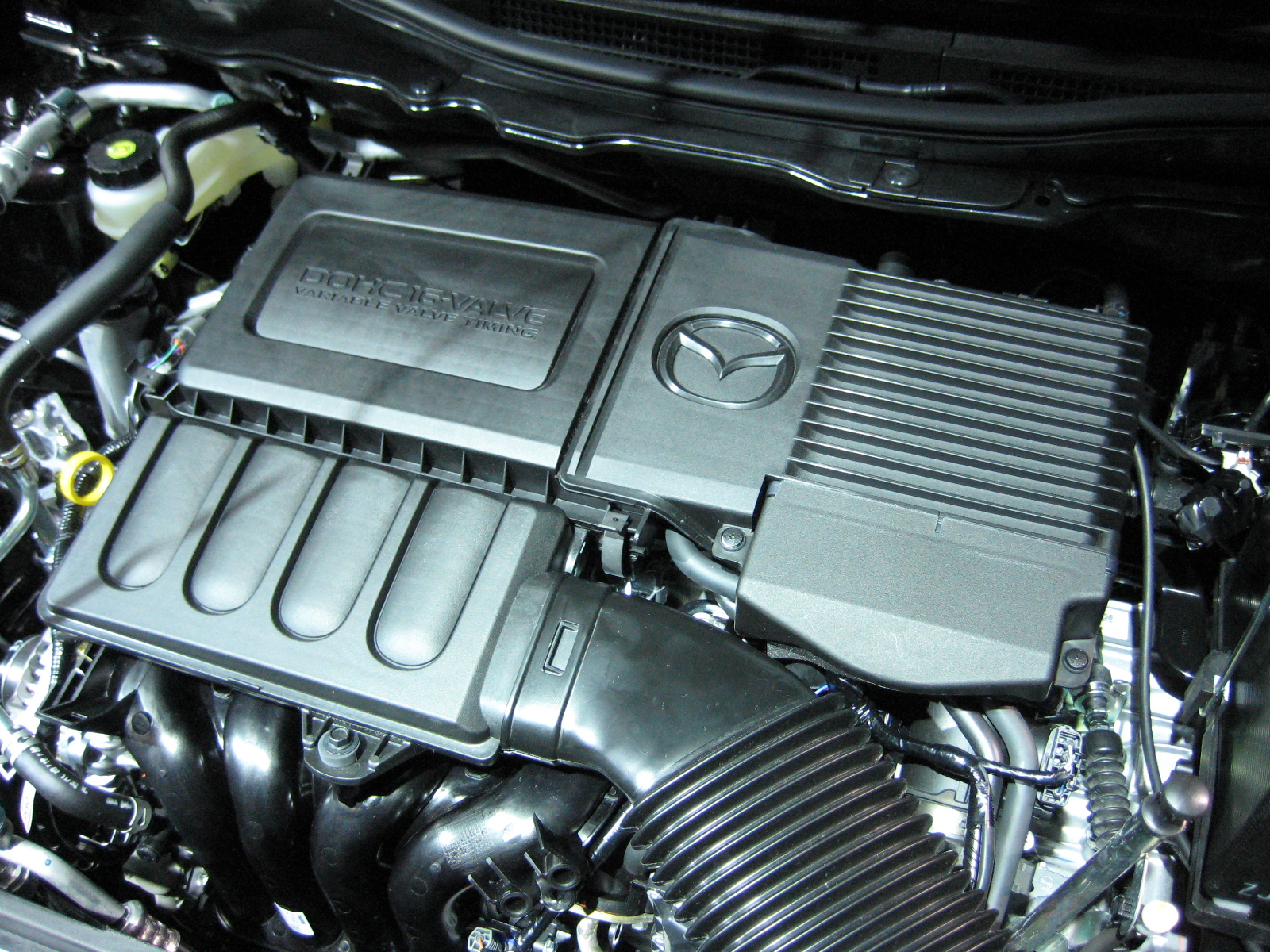
- Mazda ZY-VE engine

Overview
- Manufacturer: Mazda
- Production: 1995-2014

Layout
- Configuration: Inline 4
- Displacement: 1.3 L (1,348 cc; 82.3 cu in); 1.5 L (1,489 cc; 90.9 cu in); 1.5 L (1,498 cc; 91.4 cu in); 1.6 L (1,598 cc; 97.5 cu in)
- Cylinder bore: 74 mm (2.91 in); 75.3 mm (2.96 in); 78 mm (3.07 in)
- Piston stroke: 78.4 mm (3.09 in); 83.6 mm (3.29 in)
- Cylinder block material: Cast iron, Aluminum
- Cylinder head material: Aluminum
- Valvetrain: DOHC 4 valves x cyl. with VVT

Combustion
- Fuel system: Fuel injection
- Fuel type: Gasoline
- Oil system: Wet sump
- Cooling system: Water-cooled

Output
- Power output: 88 hp (66 kW; 89 PS); 90 hp (67 kW; 91 PS); 91 hp (68 kW; 92 PS); 92 hp (69 kW; 93 PS); 105 hp (78 kW; 106 PS); 110 hp (82 kW; 112 PS); 111 hp (83 kW; 113 PS); 130 hp (97 kW; 132 PS)

Chronology
- Predecessor: Mazda B engine
- Successor: Mazda SKYACTIV-G engine

The Mazda Z-series is a smaller gasoline inline-four engine ranging in displacements from 1.3 L to 1.6 L. They are the evolution of the cast-iron block B-engine.

The Z-engine has 16-valves operated by dual overhead camshafts, which are in turn driven by a timing chain (ZJ/Z6/ZY only). The block of the 98-02 Z5, ZM and ZL engine is cast iron same as the earlier B series of engines.

Other Z engines have aluminum alloy block and head, with cast-iron cylinder liners. The block features split upper and lower block assembly for added strength and rigidity, special long intake manifold for added torque, S-VT continuous variable valve timing, and a stainless steel 4:1 exhaust header.

In 2011, Mazda started to introduce the SkyActiv-G as a new, more economical option for vehicles that were equipped with the Mazda Z-engine. Production of the Z-series halted in 2014, being the last year of the Mazda2, Verisa as well as Mazda3 of their generations. Mazda moved on to the full SkyActiv architecture in their vehicle lineup, including running only the aforementioned SkyActiv-G engine, now offered in larger displacements, alongside a new SkyActiv-D turbo-diesel engine.

== Z5 ==
The 1.5 L (1,489 cc) 92 hp (69 kW; 93 PS) Z5-DE was used in the 1995-1998 Mazda Protegé, Mazda Lantis (Astina) and in Mazda Familia Neo (1994–1997). Bore and stroke were 75.3 mm × 83.6 mm (2.96 in × 3.29 in).

The Z5 engine was introduced as the first of a newer line of Mazda Z-series engines. The Z series was a new design based on the B-series block, block internals and oil-pan and a different DOHC head. Early versions of this motor had a chain driven exhaust cam.

The block is cast iron, the oil-pan is a 2-piece design with an upper aluminum and lower stamped steel, piston oil squirters are standard. The cylinder head was a compact design with round intake and exhaust ports. JDM versions produce 97 PS (71 kW; 96 hp) and 110 PS (81 kW; 108 hp). There was also lean-burn version introduced in August 1995; this model produces 94 PS (69 kW; 93 hp) and sees gas mileage improvements of ten to fifteen percent in the standard Japanese test cycle.

== ZJ ==
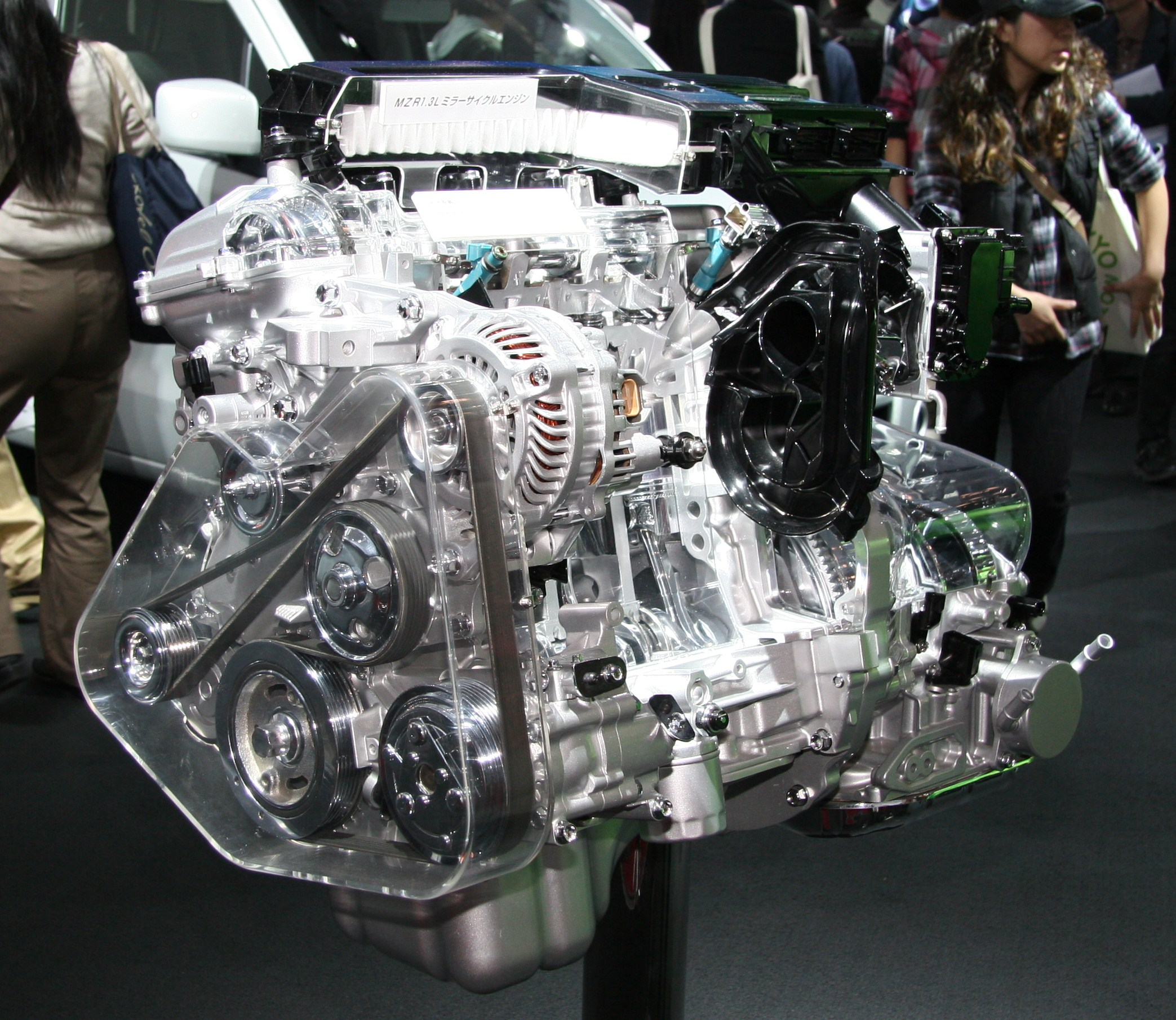
Mazda ZJ-VEM

The 1.3 L (1,348 cc) ZJ 74 mm × 78.4 mm (2.91 in × 3.09 in) is available with either continuous cam-phasing VVT ZJ-VE 91 hp (68 kW; 92 PS) or a high-efficiency Miller cycle ZJ-VEM 90 hp (67 kW; 91 PS).

Applications:

- 2003–2014 Mazda Demio ZJ-VE
- 2007–2014 Mazda Demio ZJ-VEM

== ZY ==
1.5 L (1,498 cc) 111 hp (83 kW; 113 PS) ZY-VE 78 mm × 78.4 mm (3.07 in × 3.09 in)

- Used in the Demio/Mazda2 (2002-2014), Verisa and Axela/Mazda3

== ZL ==
1.5 L (1,498 cc) 88 hp (66 kW; 89 PS) EEC, 110 hp (82 kW; 112 PS) JIS, ZL-DE 78 mm × 78.4 mm (3.07 in × 3.09 in)

1.5 L (1,498 cc) 130 hp (97 kW; 132 PS) JIS ZL-VE 78 mm × 78.4 mm (3.07 in × 3.09 in) The 1.5 L ZL-VE makes more power than the slightly larger 1.6 L Z6/M-DE its due to variable valve timing on the intake cam (S-VT).

Applications:

- 1999-2003 Mazda Familia

== ZM ==
1.6 L (1,598 cc) 105 hp (78 kW; 106 PS) ZM-DE 78 mm × 83.6 mm (3.07 in × 3.29 in) The ZM engine, has an identical bore yet slightly longer stroke than the ZL as well as a revised head with round intake and exhaust ports. It has exactly the same bore and stroke as the previous generation B6. Some European variants would use VICS on the intake manifold.

1.6 L (1,598 cc) 97 hp (72 kW; 98 PS) ZM-II was a variant of the ZM designated to the company Haima to use on the Haima Family. When the Mazda contract to Haima expired the engine was rebranded as a ZM-D and no longer would bear any Mazda markings on the valve cover.

The 1.5 L (1,498 cc) 130 hp (97 kW; 132 PS) ZL-VE and 1.6 L (1,598 cc) 105 hp (78 kW; 106 PS) ZM-DE are closely related engines with an equal bore 78 mm (3.1 in) and share some major parts. The ZL has a stroke of 78.4 mm (3.09 in) whilst the ZM has 83.6 mm (3.29 in).

Applications:

- 1998-2002 Mazda Familia
- 2003-2013 Mazda3
