= Variable-length intake manifold =

Internal combustion engine technology

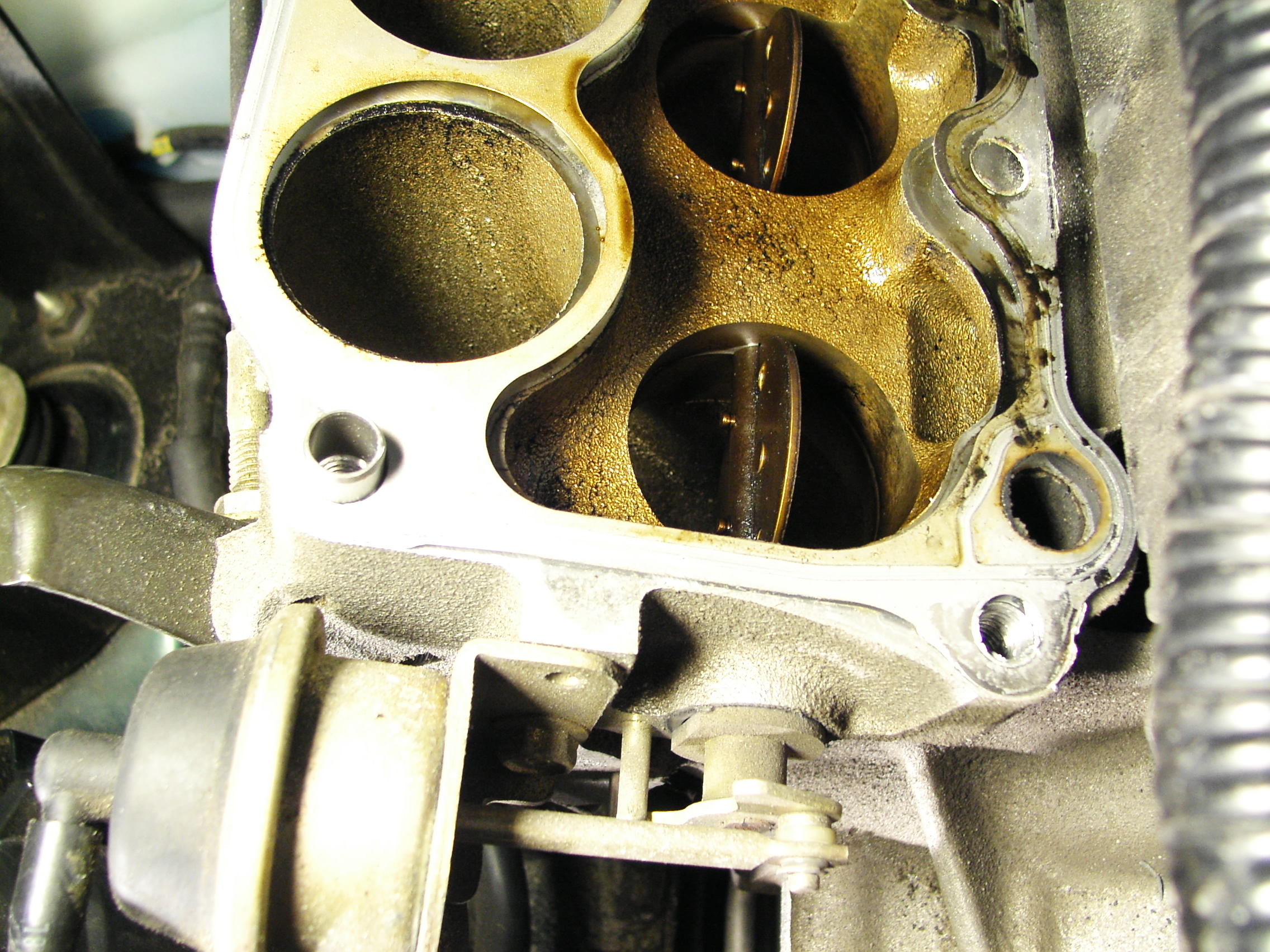
Lower intake manifold on a 1999 Mazda Miata engine, showing components of a variable-length intake system.

In internal combustion engines, a variable-length intake manifold (VLIM),variable intake manifold (VIM), or variable intake system (VIS) is an automobile internal combustion engine manifold technology. As the name implies, VLIM/VIM/VIS can vary the length of the intake tract in order to optimise power and torque across the range of engine speed operation, as well as to help provide better fuel efficiency. This effect is often achieved by having two separate intake ports, each controlled by a valve, that open two different manifolds – one with a short path that operates at full engine load, and another with a significantly longer path that operates at lower load. The first patent issued for a variable length intake manifold was published in 1958, US Patent US2835235 by Daimler Benz AG.

There are two main effects of variable intake geometry:

Swirl
Variable geometry can create a beneficial air swirl pattern, or turbulence in the combustion chamber. The swirling helps distribute the fuel and form a homogeneous air-fuel mixture. This aids the initiation of the combustion process, helps minimise engine knocking, and helps facilitate complete combustion. At low revolutions per minute (rpm), the speed of the airflow is increased by directing the air through a longer path with limited capacity (i.e., cross-sectional area) and this assists in improving low engine speed torque. At high rpm, the shorter and larger path opens when the load increases, so that a greater amount of air with least resistance can enter the chamber. This helps maximise 'top-end' power. In double overhead camshaft (DOHC) designs, the air paths may sometimes be connected to separate intake valves so the shorter path can be excluded by de-activating the intake valve itself.
Pressurisation
A tuned intake path can have a light pressurising effect similar to a low-pressure supercharger due to Helmholtz resonance. However, this effect occurs only over a narrow engine speed band. A variable intake can create two or more pressurized "hot spots", increasing engine output. When the intake air speed is higher, the dynamic pressure pushing the air (and/or mixture) inside the engine is increased. The dynamic pressure is proportional to the square of the inlet air speed, so by making the passage narrower or longer the speed/dynamic pressure is increased.

== Applications ==
Many automobile manufacturers use similar technology with different names. Another common term for this technology is variable resonance induction system (VRIS).

- Acura — Variable Volume Induction 3.0-litre V6 C30A (1991-2005) and 3.2-litre V6 C32B (1997-2005); 3.2 L V6 J32A3 (2004-2008); 2.0-litre I4 R20A (2013-2015) petrol engines
- Audi — 2.8-litre V6 petrol engine (1991–98); 3.0-litre V6 (2002-2005); 3.6 and 4.2-litre V8 engines, 1987–present
- Alfa Romeo — Twin Spark 16v (1.8 and 2.0-litre) and JTS engines
- BMW — DISA (DIfferenzierte SaugAnlage – "Differential Air Intake"), two stage: M42, M44, M54, N62TU, three stage: N52; DIVA (continuously variable length runners): N62, is the world's first continuously variable length intake manifold.
- Citroën — XM 3,0 V6.24 (200 hp) used during 1991 to 1997, ZX Coupe 2.0 16v XU10J4 engine.
- Daewoo — Variable Geometry Induction System (VGIS) Lanos
- Dodge / Chrysler — 3.5 L V6 EGE, (1993-1997) used in Dodge Intrepid, Chrysler Concorde and LHS; 2.0 A588 - ECH (2001–2005) used in the 2001-2005 model year Dodge Neon R/T; 6.4 L V8 2011-2014 Dodge Charger and Challenger, Chrysler 300, Jeep Grand Cherokee (SRT8 versions)
- Ferrari — 360 Modena, 550 Maranello, LaFerrari
- Fiat – Controlled High Turbulence (1985–91, Fiat Croma CHT), StarJet engine, dubbed Port Deactivation (PDA), Variable Intake System on the 131HP 1.8 16V and on the 155 HP 2.0 20V Pratola Serra engine.
- Ford — Dual-Stage Intake (DSI), on their Duratec 2.5 and 3.0-litre V6s, and it was also found on the Yamaha V6 in the Taurus SHO. The Ford Modular V8 engines and the V6 Cologne use either the Intake Manifold Runner Control (IMRC) for four-valve engines, or the Charge Motion Control Valve (CMCV) for three-valve engines. The SVT edition (in North America) and ST170 edition (in Europe) of the Ford Focus added IMRC to the Ford Zetec engine. A system called Split Port Induction (SPI) was used on the 2.0L CVH I4 of the 1997-2002 Escort and 2000-2004 Focus, and the 3.8L Essex V6 of the 1996-2003 Windstar and 2001-2004 Mustang.
- General Motors — 3.9-litre LZ8/LZ9 V6, 3.2-litre LA3 V6, LT5 5.7-litre
- GM Korea — DOHC versions of E-TEC II engines
- Holden — Alloytec
- Honda — Integra, Legend, NSX, Prelude, Civic, Accord Hybrid, Inspire, Ridgeline, Honda Civic (ninth generation)
- Hyundai — XG V6
- Isuzu — Rodeo used in the second generation V6, 3.2-litre (6VD1) Rodeos, and third generation Gemini 1.6-litre 16v (4XE1) engines
- Jaguar — AJ-V6
- Kia — Carnival, Sedona
- Land Rover — Variable Geometry Induction: Freelander V6 (2001-2006)
- Lancia — VIS
- Mazda — Variable Inertia Charging System (VICS) is used on the Mazda FE-DOHC engine and Mazda B engine family of inline-four engines, and Variable Resonance Induction System (VRIS) in the Mazda K engine family of V6 engines. An updated version of this technology is employed on Mazda's new Z and L engines, which is also used by Ford as the Duratec.
- Mercedes-Benz — V6 M112, V6 M272, V8 AMG M156
- MG — ZT 190, 180, 160 (2001-2005), ZS 180 (2001-2005)
- Mitsubishi — Mitsubishi Variable Induction Management (MVIM) 1991-1999 3000GT NA DOHC, 2003-2005 Eclipse
- Nissan — inline-four engines, V6 engines, V8 engines
- Opel — DUAL RAM – select six-cylinder Opel cam-in-head engines; TWINPORT – modern versions of Ecotec Family 1 and Ecotec Family 0 inline-four engines and inline-three engines; a similar technology is used in 3.2-litre 54° V6 engine.
- Peugeot — 2.2-litre inline-four engine, 3.0-litre V6, 2.0 16v XU10J4 engine (non /z version)
- Porsche — 928 "flappy", VarioRam, 964, 993, 996, Boxster
- Proton — Campro CPS and VIM, Proton Gen-2 CPS and Proton Waja CPS; Proton Campro IAFM - 2008 Proton Saga 1.3
- Renault — Clio 2.0 RS
- Roewe — Variable Geometry Induction: Roewe 750 2.5 (2006–present).
- Rover — Variable Geometry Induction: Rover 825 (1996-1999), Rover 75 V6 (1998-2005)
- Subaru – Subaru Legacy Japan only using EJ204 (version D) 2.0 Litre, Naturally aspirated engine
- Suzuki – VIS
- Toyota — Toyota Variable Induction System (T-VIS), used in early versions of the 1G-GEU, 3S-GTE, 3S-GE, and 4A-GE engines and some 7A-FE engines, and Acoustic Control Induction System (ACIS), used in the E, G, GR, GZ, JZ, M, S, MZ, UZ, UR, and VZ engines.
- Volkswagen — 1.6-litre inline-four engine, V6 engines, VR5 engines, VR6 engines, W8 engines, V8 engines
- Volvo — V-VIS (Volvo Variable Induction System) Volvo B52 engine as found on the Volvo 850. Longer inlet ducts used between 1,500 and 4,100 rpm at 80% load or higher.
