= S-VT =

Automobile variable valve timing technology

S-VT, or Sequential Valve Timing, is an automobile variable valve timing technology developed by Mazda. S-VT varies the timing of the intake valves by using hydraulic pressure to rotate the camshaft. S-VT was introduced in 1998 on the ZL-VE engine and is used in the B-, Z-, MZR- and J-families of engines.

== See also ==
- Variable valve timing
