= List of Mazda vehicles =

This is a list of Mazda motor vehicle models. Mazda had used a number of different marques in the Japan market, including Autozam, Eunos, and Efini, although they have been phased out. In the early 1990s Mazda almost created a luxury marque, Amati, to challenge Acura, Infiniti, and Lexus in North America, but this never happened, leaving the near-luxury Millenia to the Mazda brand. Many Mazda vehicles have been rebadged and sold with the Ford brand during the alliance of both companies. Most are noted in the pages of individual vehicles.

Previous sports models of Mazda's regular vehicles go by the Mazdaspeed name. Mazdaspeed is Mazda's in-house race and street car tuning arm and is highly involved in both amateur and professional motorsports.

== Current production vehicles ==
This is the current Mazda automobile listing internationally.

Body style	Model			Current generation		Vehicle description
Body style	Image	Name(s)	Introduction (cal. year)	Introduction (cal. year)	Facelift	Vehicle description
Hatchback		Mazda2	2002	2014	2023	Subcompact hatchback. Also marketed as the Demio in Japan until 2019.
Hatchback		Mazda2 Hybrid	2021	2021	2024	Rebadged Toyota Yaris Hybrid (XP210) for the European market.
Hatchback		Mazda3	2003	2019	—	Compact hatchback. Also marketed as the Axela in Japan until 2019.
Sedan/liftback		Mazda2	2002	2014	2023	Sedan version of the Mazda2, sold in Asia-Pacific and Latin America.
Sedan/liftback		Mazda3	2003	2019	—	Sedan version of the Mazda3.
Sedan/liftback		EZ-6/6e	2024	2024	—	Mid-size electric and range extender liftback based on the Deepal L07 for the Chinese and European market.
SUV/ crossover		CX-3	2015	2015	2018	Subcompact crossover SUV based on the Mazda2.
SUV/ crossover		CX-30	2019	2019	—	Subcompact crossover SUV.
SUV/ crossover		CX-5	2012	2025	—	Compact crossover SUV.
SUV/ crossover		CX-50	2022	2022	—	Compact crossover SUV for North America and China.
SUV/ crossover		CX-60	2022	2022	—	Mid-size crossover SUV based on an RWD platform for Europe and Asia-Pacific.
SUV/ crossover		CX-70	2024	2024	—	Mid-size crossover SUV with two-row seating based on an RWD platform for North America and Australia. Two-row version of the CX-90.
SUV/ crossover		CX-8	2017	2017	2022	Mid-size crossover SUV with three-row seating for Asia-Pacific.
SUV/ crossover		CX-80	2024	2024	—	Mid-size crossover SUV with three-row seating based on an RWD platform for Europe and Asia-Pacific.
SUV/ crossover		CX-90	2023	2023	—	Full-size crossover SUV with three-row seating based on an RWD platform for North America, Middle East and Australia.
SUV/ crossover		EZ-60/CX-6e	2025	2025	—	Mid-size electric and range extender CUV based on the Deepal S07 for the Chinese and European market.
SUV/ crossover		MX-30	2020	2020	—	All-electric and hybrid compact crossover SUV based on the CX-30.
Roadster		MX-5/ Roadster	1989	2015	2023	Front-engine, two-door, two-seater sports car.
Pickup truck		Bongo	1966	2020	—	Pickup version of the Bongo.
Pickup truck		BT-50	2006	2020	2024	Compact pickup truck. Third generation is based on Isuzu D-Max.
Kei vehicles		Carol	1962	2021	2025	Low-roof hatchback kei car with hinged rear doors. Second generation onwards is a rebadged Suzuki Alto.
Kei vehicles		Flair	2012	2017	—	Low-roof hatchback kei car with hinged rear doors. Rebadged Suzuki Wagon R.
Kei vehicles		Flair Crossover	2014	2020	—	Crossover SUV-styled kei car. Rebadged Suzuki Hustler.
Kei vehicles		Flair Wagon	2008	2024	—	Semi tall-height wagon kei car with rear sliding doors. Rebadged Suzuki Spacia.
Kei vehicles		Scrum	1989	2013	2026	Cabover kei truck. Rebadged Suzuki Carry. Formerly the Autozam Scrum until 1998.
Kei vehicles		Scrum	1989	2015	—	Cabover cargo/passenger microvan with rear sliding doors. Rebadged Suzuki Every cargo van. Formerly the Autozam Scrum Van until 1998.
Commercial vans		Bongo Brawny	1983	2019	—	Long-wheelbase version of the Bongo Van. Third generation is a rebadged H200-series Toyota HiAce.
Commercial vans		Bongo	1966	2020	—	Cabover van. Fifth generation is a rebadged Daihatsu Gran Max.
Commercial vans		Familia Van (XP160)	2018	2018	—	Light commercial van. Rebadged Toyota Probox.
Commercial trucks		Titan	1971	2023	—	Medium-duty truck. Fourth generation onwards is a rebadged Isuzu Elf.

== Former production vehicles ==
Model	Introduced	Discontinued	Notes	Image
Mazda Romper	1958	1965	Renamed from D-series from 1959	
Mazda R360	1960	1966		
Mazda B-series	1961	2006		
Mazda Roadpacer	1975	1979	based on the Holden HJ and Holden HX series Premier	
Mazda Familia	1964	2003		
Mazda Kraft	1965	1977	Light duty truck	
Mazda Luce	1966	1991	mid-sized luxury car	
Mazda Cosmo	1967	1996	Renamed to Eunos Cosmo from 1991	
Mazda Boxer	1969	1980	also sold as the Kia Boxer	(Kia Boxer model)
Mazda Capella	1970	2002		
Mazda Pathfinder XV-1	1970	1973	a military vehicle	
Mazda Savanna	1971	1991	Japanese nameplate rotary-powered sport car	
Mazda Chantez	1972	1976		
Mazda Porter	1969	1989		
Mazda B360	1961	1966		
Mazda Parkway	1972	1997	minibus based on Mazda Titan	
Mazda 929	1973	1997	export version of the Mazda Luce (1973-1991), Mazda Cosmo (1982-1987), and Mazda Sentia(1991-1997)	
Mazda 323	1977	2003	export version of the Mazda Familia	
Mazda RX-7	1978	2002	also known as Savanna RX-7 in other Japan from 1978-1991	
Mazda 626	1978	2003	export version of the Mazda Capella	
Mazda Rustler	1983	2001	rebadged from Ford Bantam	
Mazda Persona	1988	1992	The luxury-oriented version of the Capella, Also called the Eunos 300	
Mazda 121	1986	2002	Export version of the Revue, then rebadged from Ford Fiesta (fourth generation)	
Mazda MX-6	1988	1997	export version of the Mazda Capella	
Mazda MPV/Mazda8	1996	2016		
Mazda Sentia	1990	1998		
Mazda MX-3	1990	1998		
Mazda Revue	1990	1998		
Mazda Lantis/Cronos	1991	1994	sister car of the Familia	
Mazda Millenia	1993	2002		
Mazda AZ-Wagon	1994	2012	rebadged from Suzuki Wagon R	
Mazda Demio	1996	2019	Japan version of Mazda2	
Mazda AZ-Offroad	1998	2014	rebadged from third-generation Suzuki Jimny	
Mazda Laputa	1999	2006	rebadged from Suzuki Kei	
Mazda Premacy/Mazda5	1999	2018		
Mazda Étude	1987	1989		
Mazda Tribute	2000	2011		
Mazda Proceed Levante	1995	1999	rebadge from Suzuki Vitara	
Mazda Proceed Marvie	1991	1997		
Mazda Atenza/Mazda6	2002	2025		
Mazda Axela	2003	2019	Japan version from Mazda3	
Mazda RX-8	2003	2012	rotary-powered sport car	
Mazda Verisa	2004	2015		
Mazda CX-9	2006	2024		
Mazda CX-7	2006	2012		
Mazda Biante	2008	2018		
Mazda VX-1	2013	2017	rebadged from Suzuki Ertiga	
Mazda CX-4	2016	2025	sold exclusively in China	

== Concept cars ==
- Mazda Activehicle (1999)
- Mazda Arata (2024)
- Mazda AZ550 (1989)
- Mazda BU-X (1995)
- Mazda Chantez EV (1972)
- Mazda CU-X (1995)
- Mazda CVS (1974)
- Mazda Deep Orange 3 (2013)
- Mazda EX-005 (1970)
- Mazda Furai (2008)
- Mazda Gissya (1991)
- Mazda Hakaze (2007)
- Mazda Hazumi (2014)
- Mazda HR-X (1991)
- Mazda HR-X 2 (1993)
- Mazda Ibuki (2003)
- Mazda Iconic SP (2023)
- Mazda Kaan (2008)
- Mazda Kabura (2006)
- Mazda Kai (2017)
- Mazda Kazamai (2008)
- Mazda Kiyora (2008)
- Mazda Koeru (2015)
- Mazda Kusabi (2003)
- Mazda Le Mans Prototype (1983)
- Mazda LM55 Vision Gran Turismo (2014)
- Mazda London Taxi (1993)
- Mazda Miata Mono-Posto (1999)
- Mazda Minagi (2011)
- Mazda MS-X (1997)
- Mazda MV-X (1997)
- Mazda MX-02 (1983)
- Mazda MX-03 (1985)
- Mazda MX-04 (1987)
- Mazda MX-5 Superlight (2009)
- Mazda MX-81 (1981)
- Mazda MX-Crossport (2005)
- Mazda MX-Flexa (2004)
- Mazda MX-Micro Sport (2004)
- Mazda MX Sport Tourer (2001)
- Mazda MX Sportif (2003)
- Mazda Nagare (2006)
- Mazda Neospace (1999)
- Mazda Nextourer (1999)
- Mazda Pair (1987)
- Mazda RX-01 (1995)
- Mazda RX 87 (1967)
- Mazda RX-500 (1970)
- Mazda RX-510 (1971)
- Mazda RX-Evolv (1999)
- Mazda RX-Vision (2015)
- Mazda Ryuga (2007)
- Mazda Sassou (2005)
- Mazda Secret Hideout (2001)
- Mazda Senku (2005)
- Mazda Shinari (2010)
- Mazda SU-V (1995)
- Mazda SW-X (1999)
- Mazda Taiki (2007)
- Mazda Takeri (2011)
- Mazda TD-R (1989)
- Mazda Vision Coupe (2017)
- Mazda Vision X-Coupe (2025)
- Mazda Vision X-Compact (2025)
- Mazda Washu (2003)
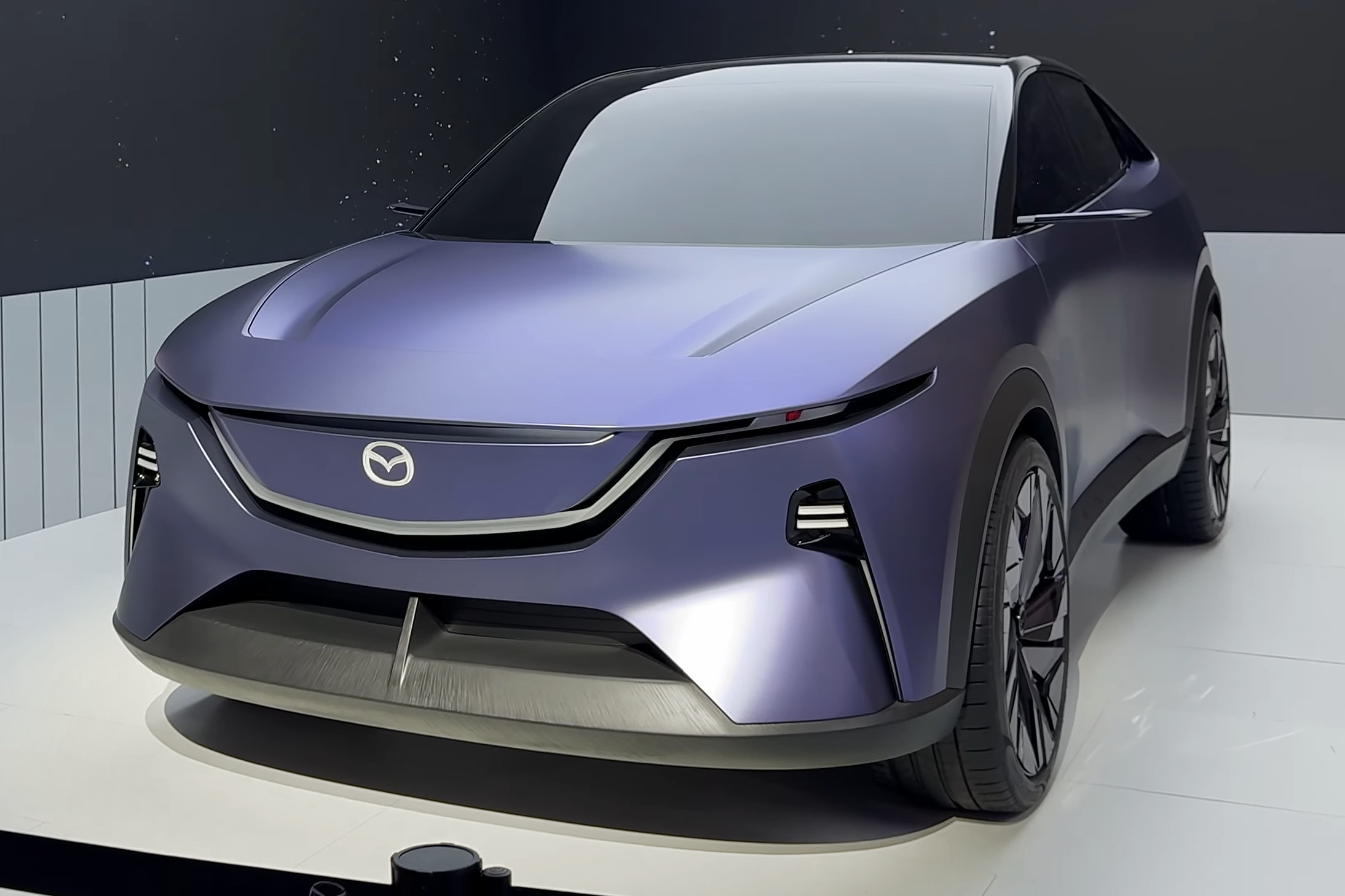
Arata

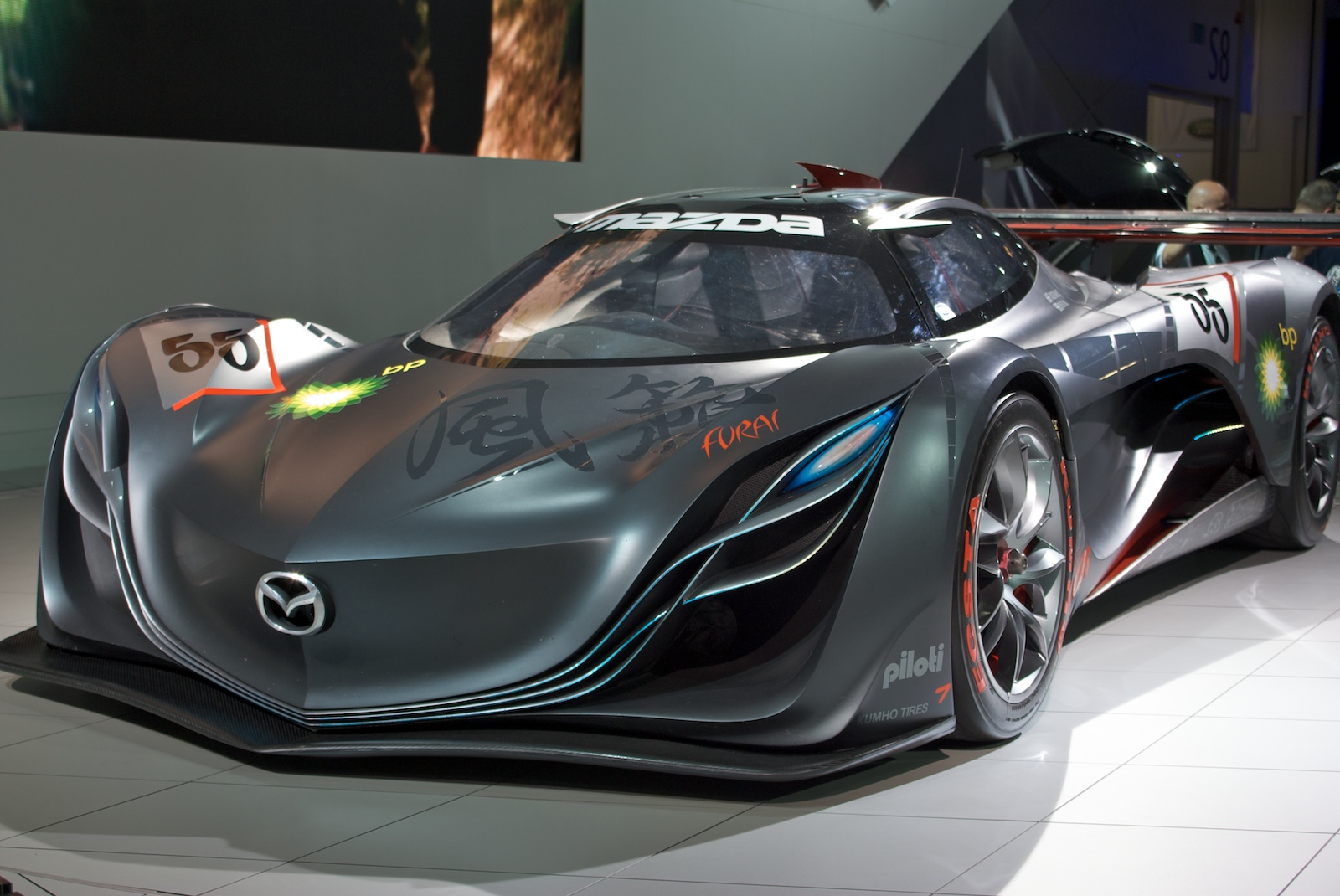
Furai

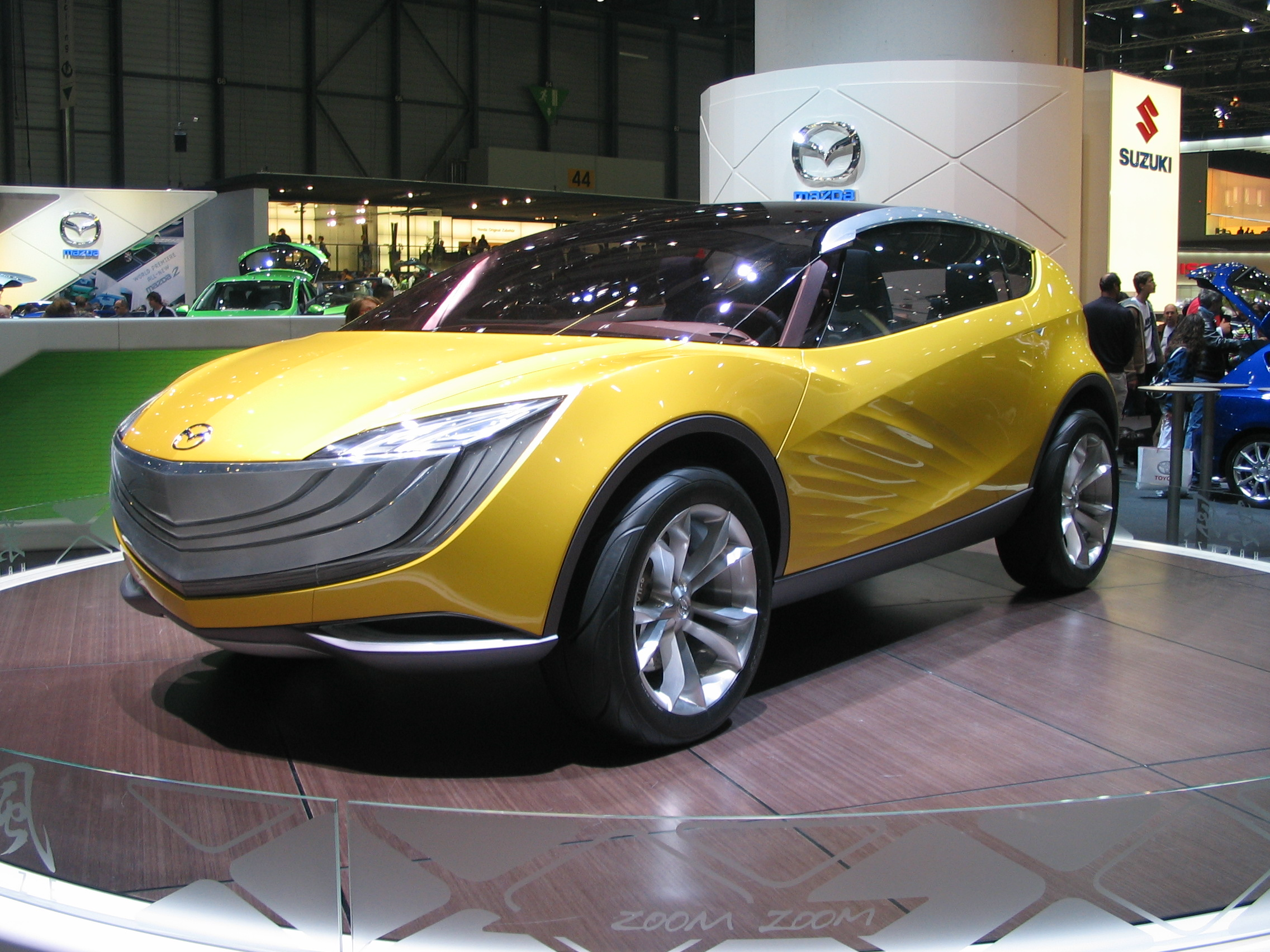
Hakaze

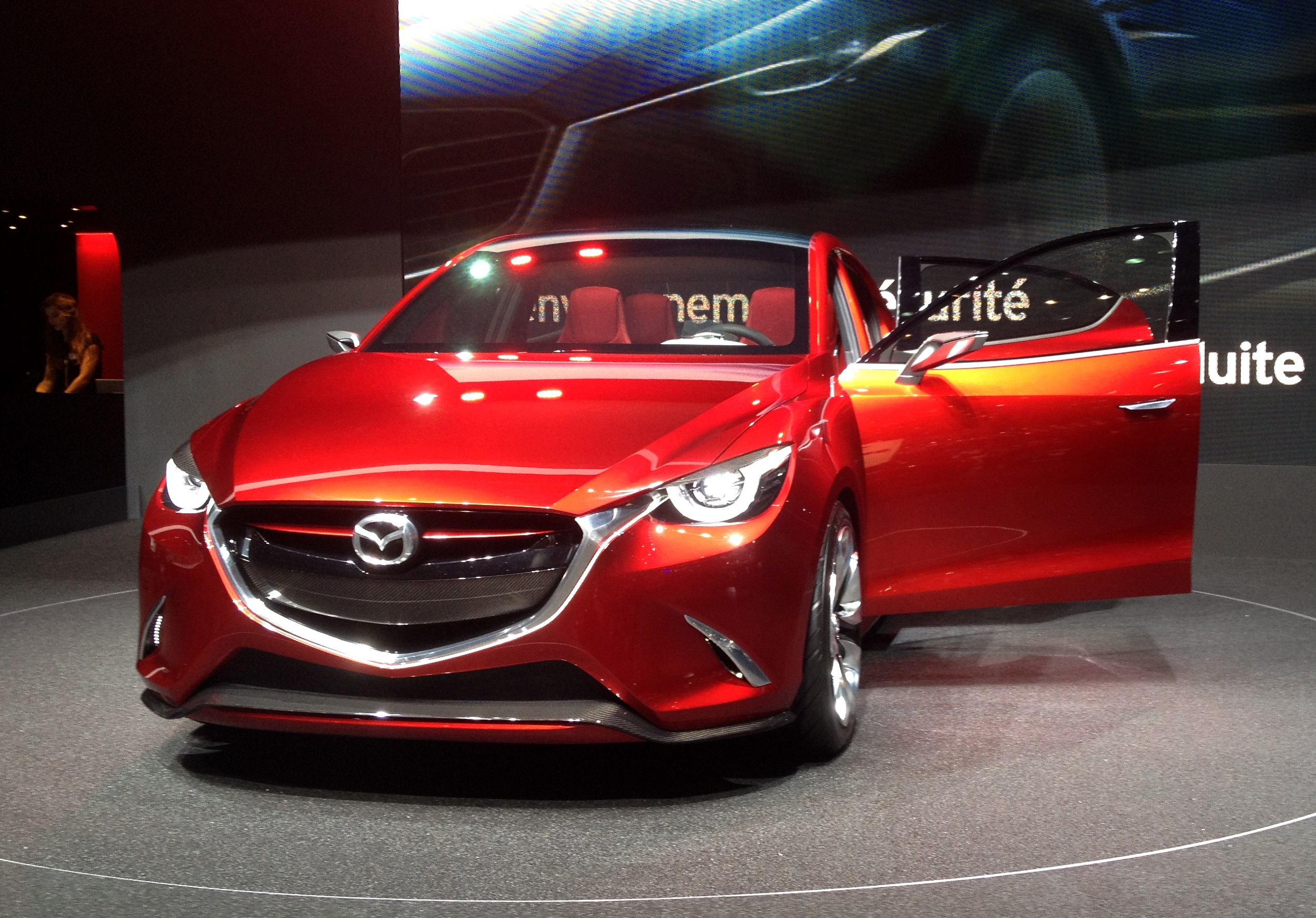
Hazumi

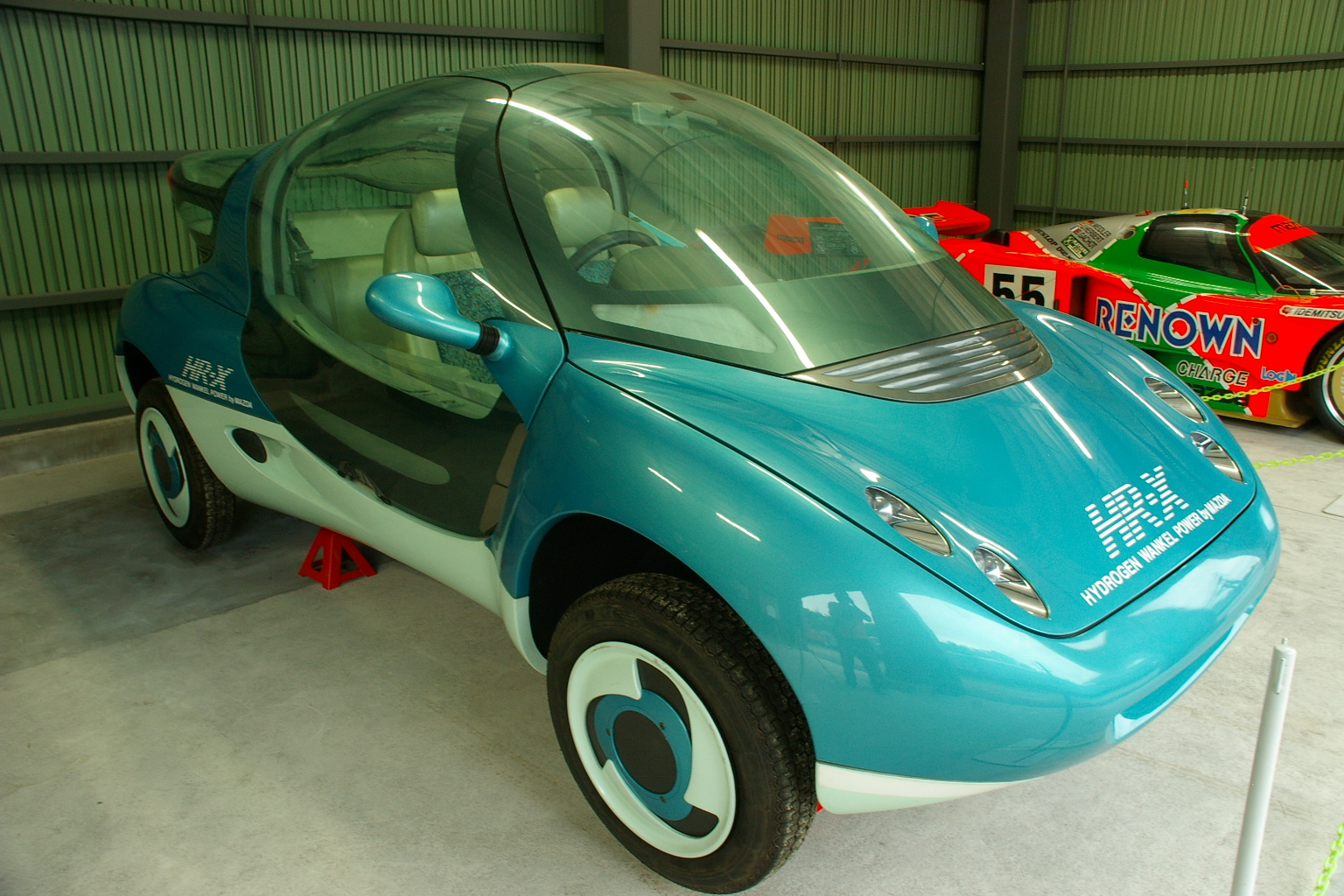
HR-X

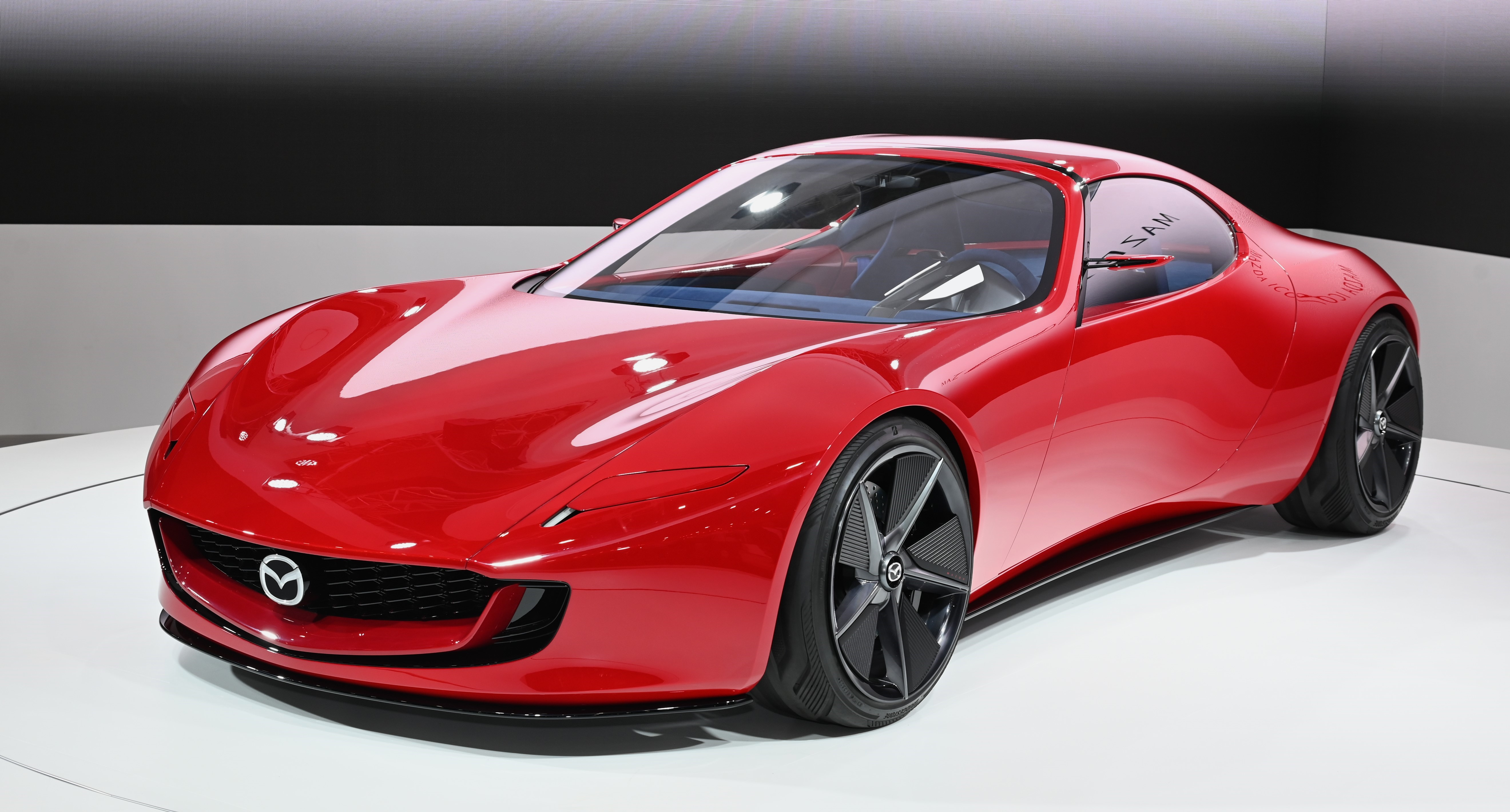
Iconic SP

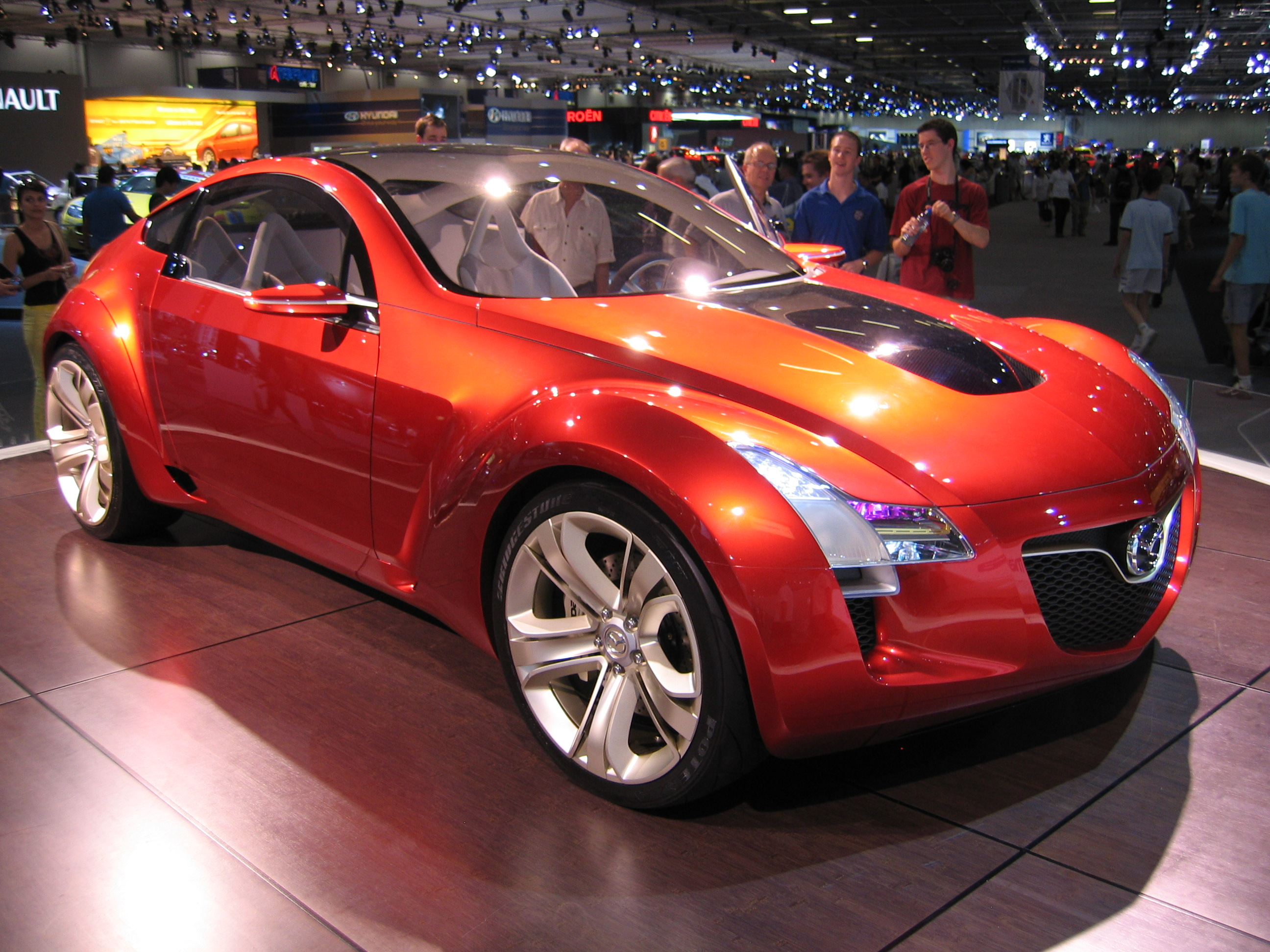
Kabura

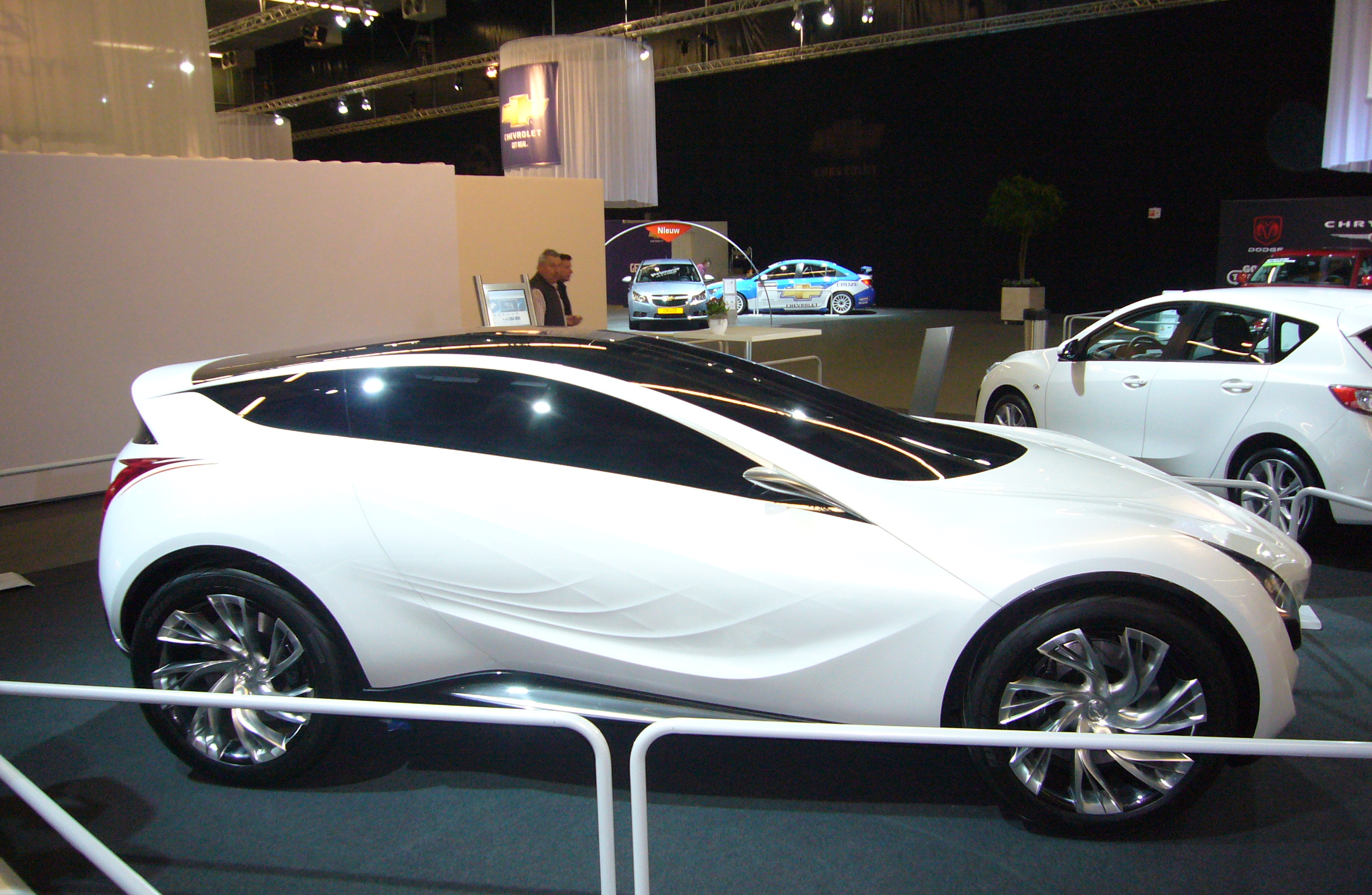
Kazamai

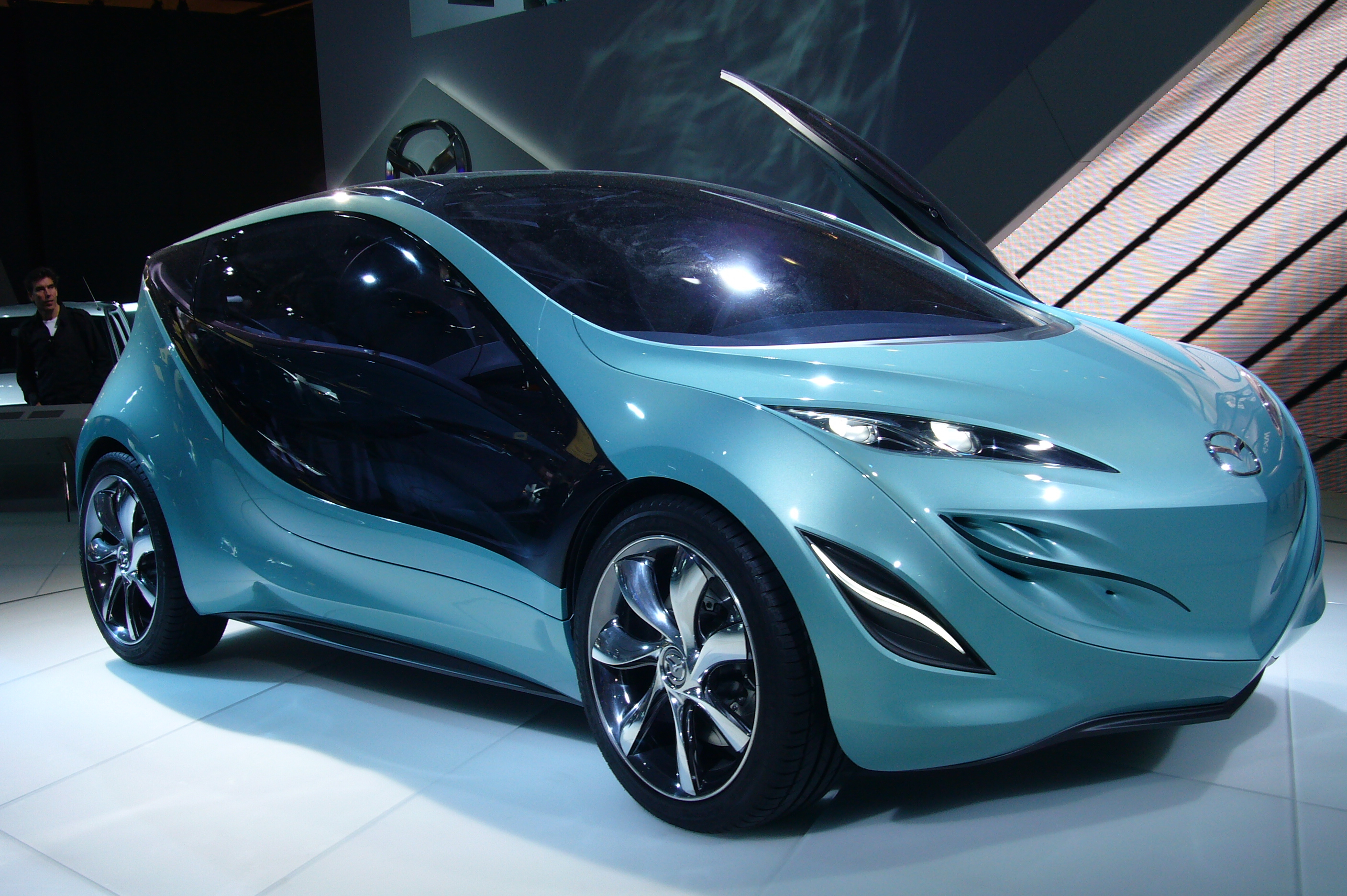
Kiyora

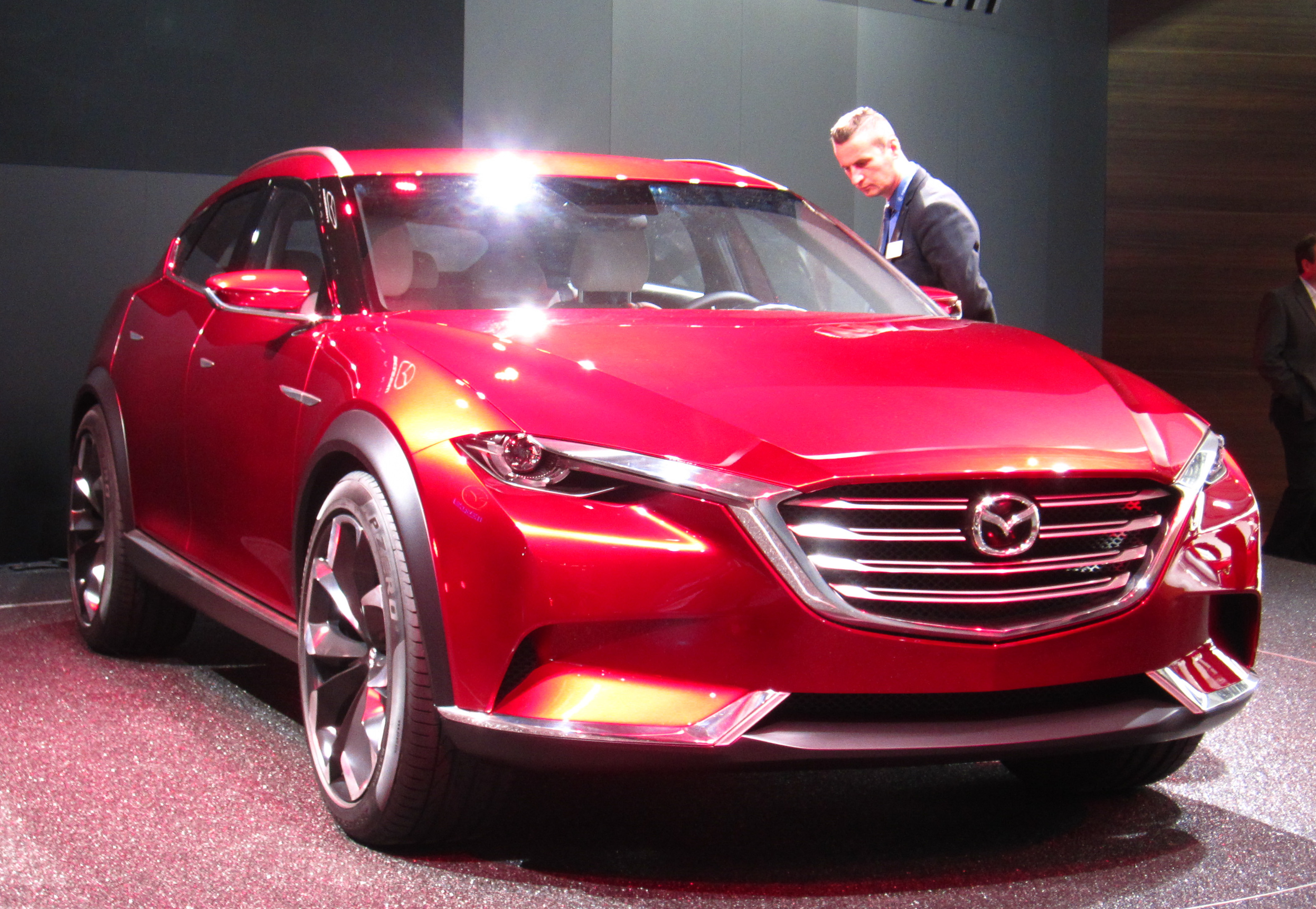
Koeru

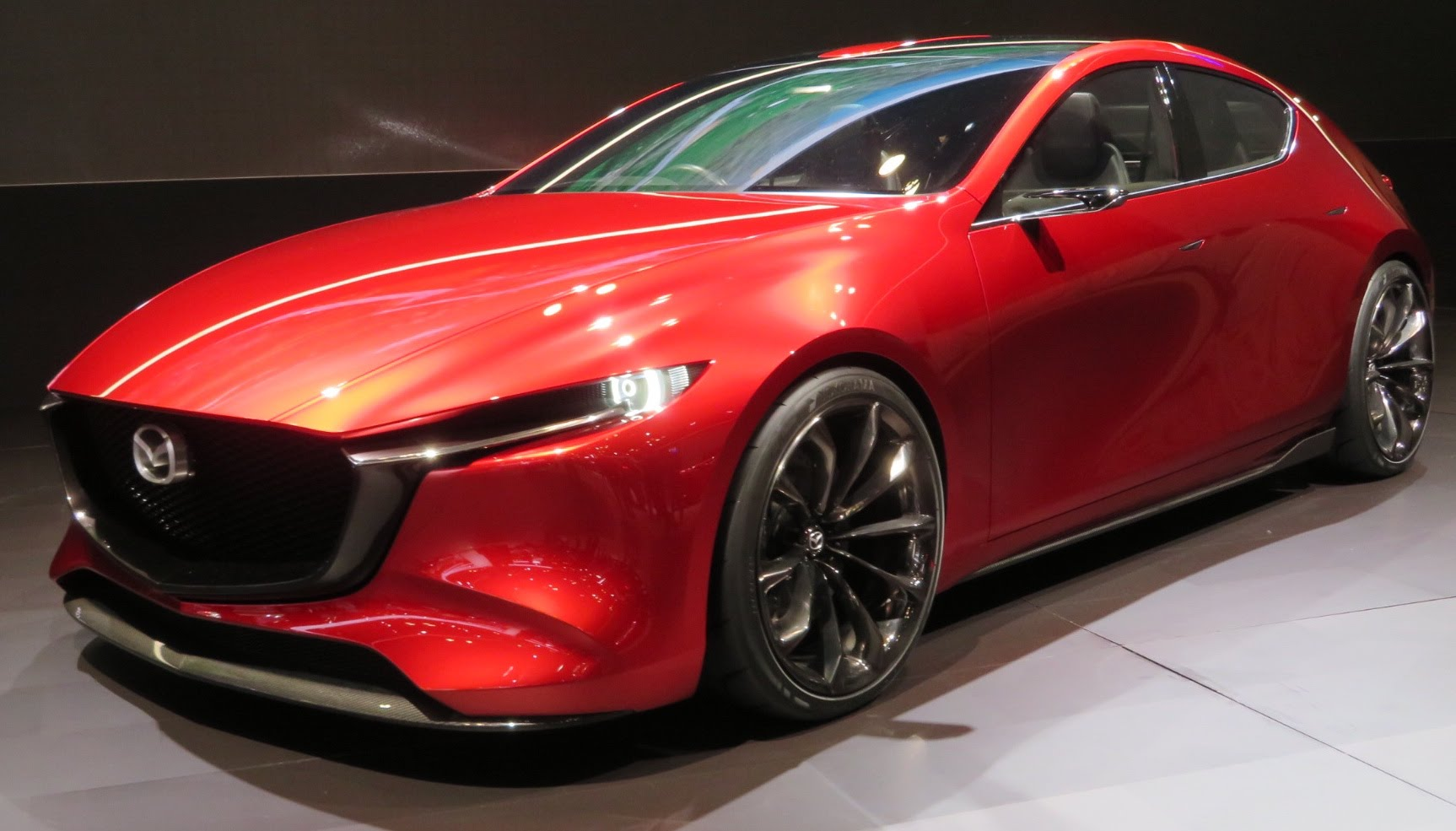
Kai

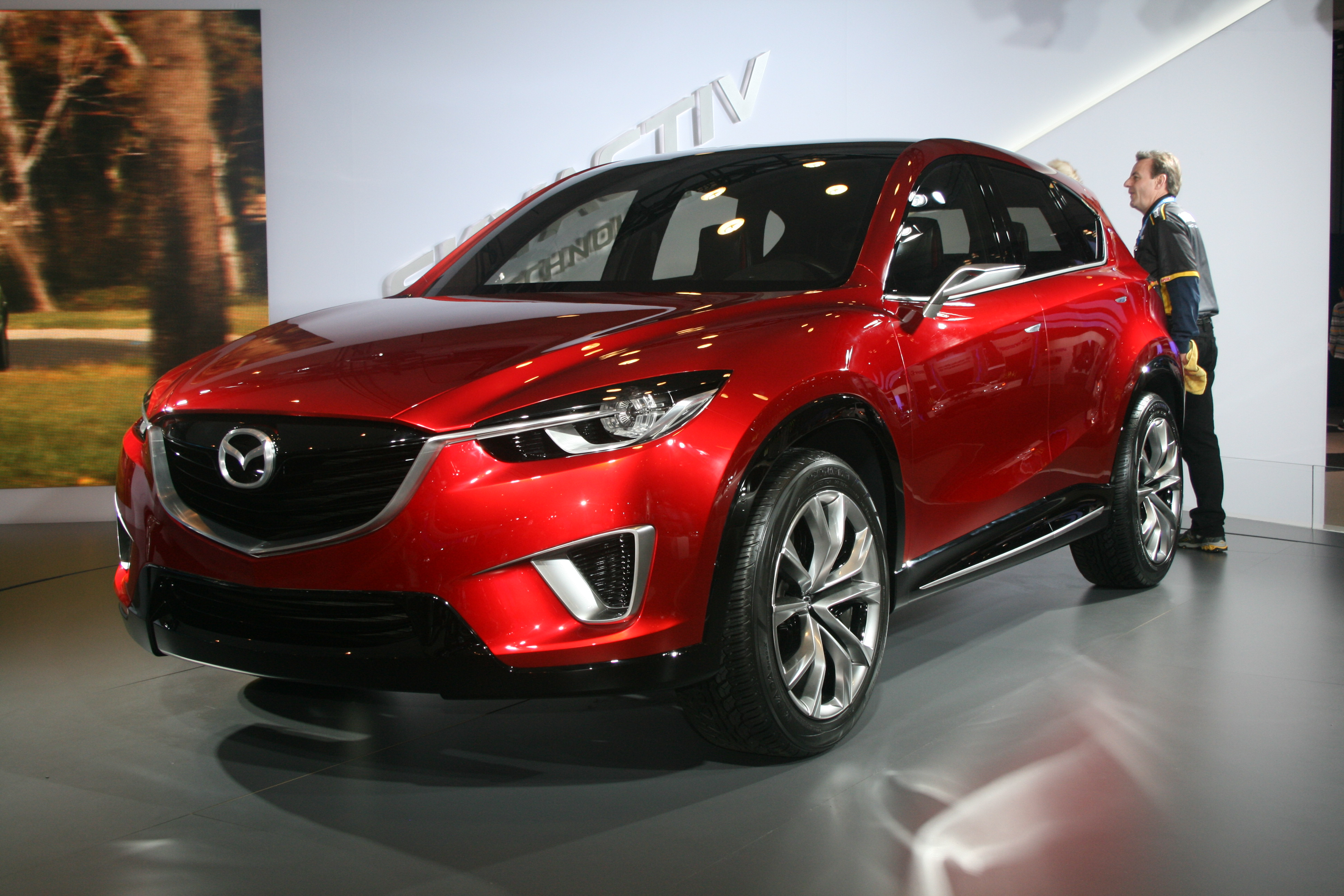
Minagi

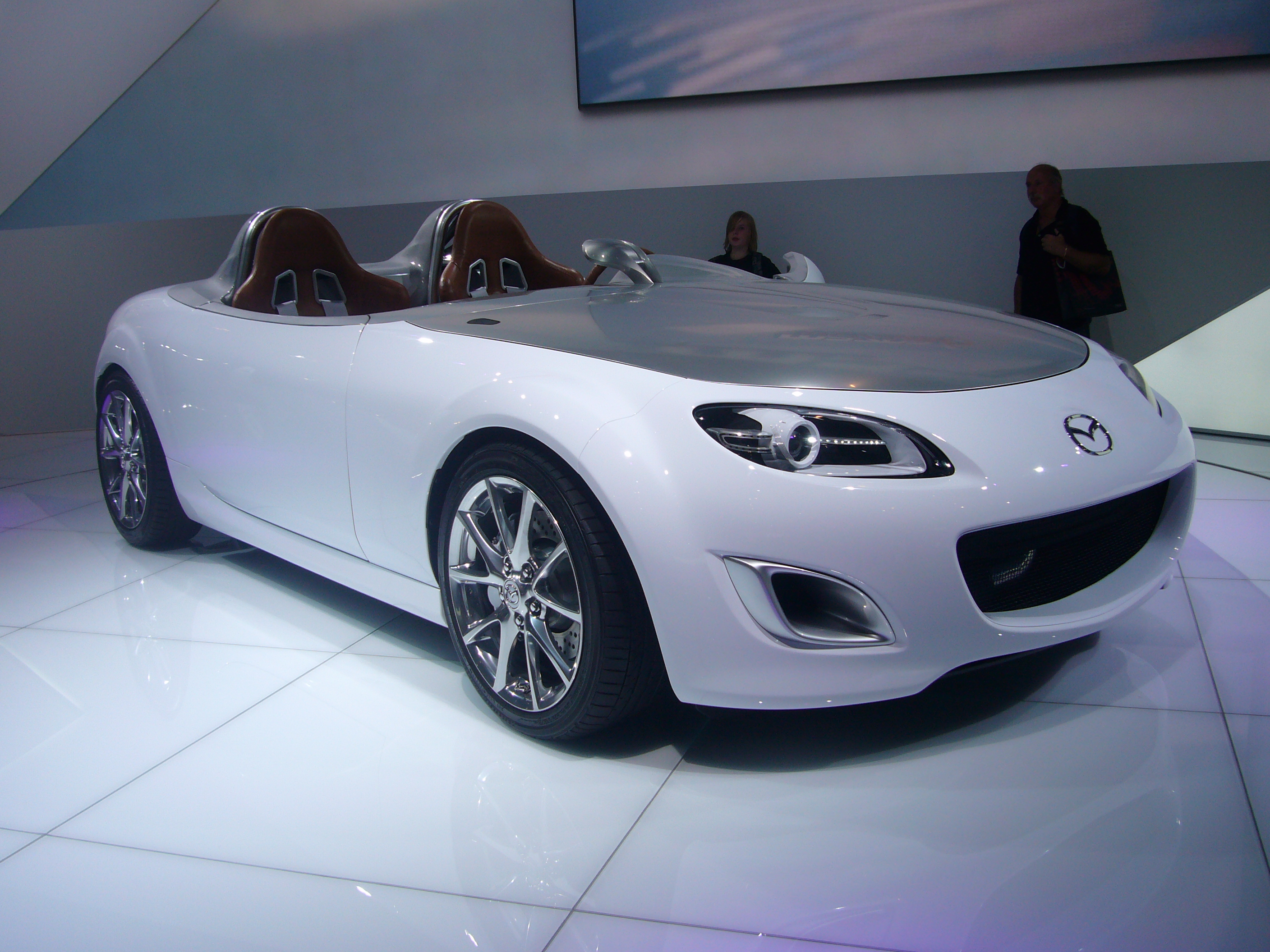
MX-5 Superlight

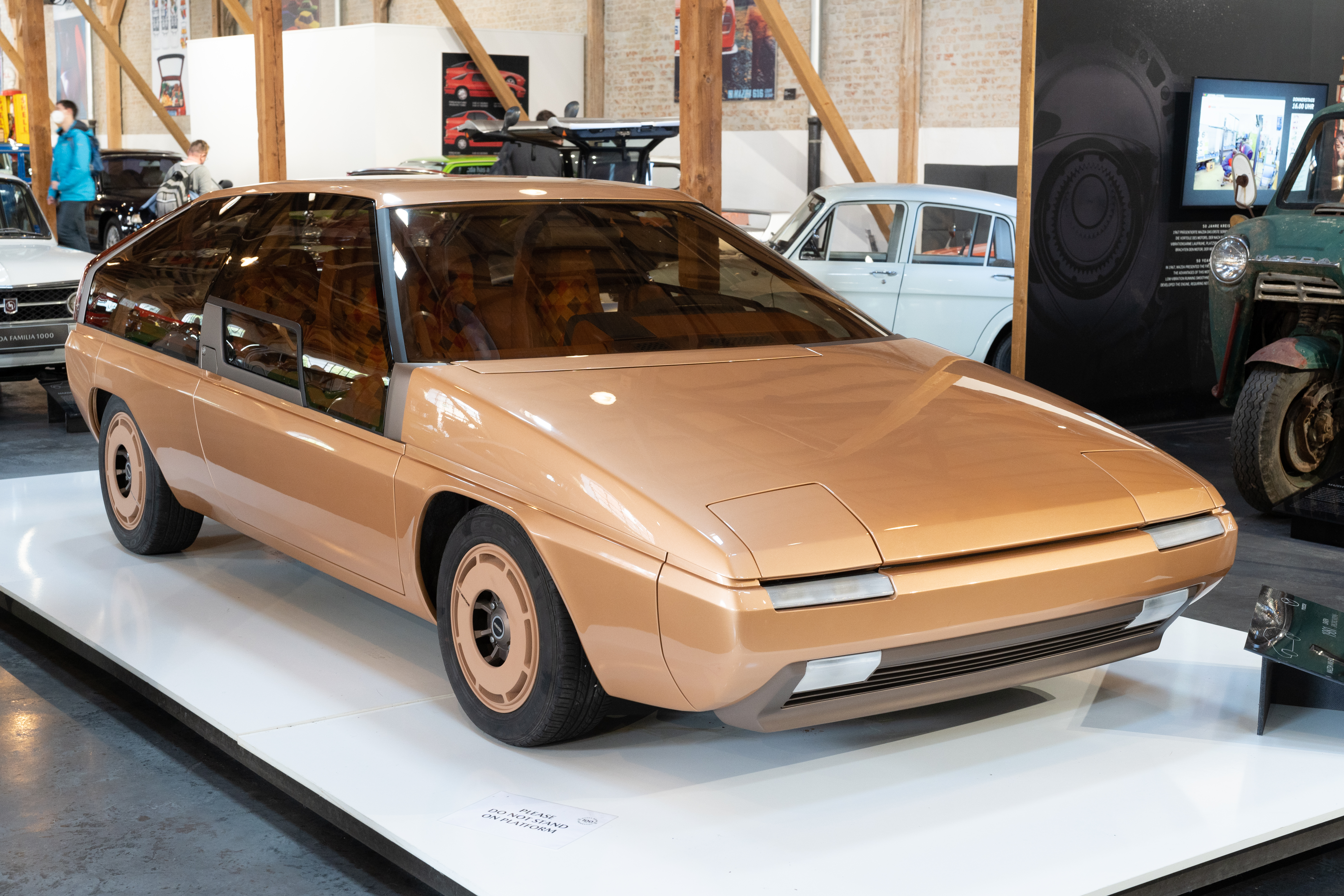
MX-81

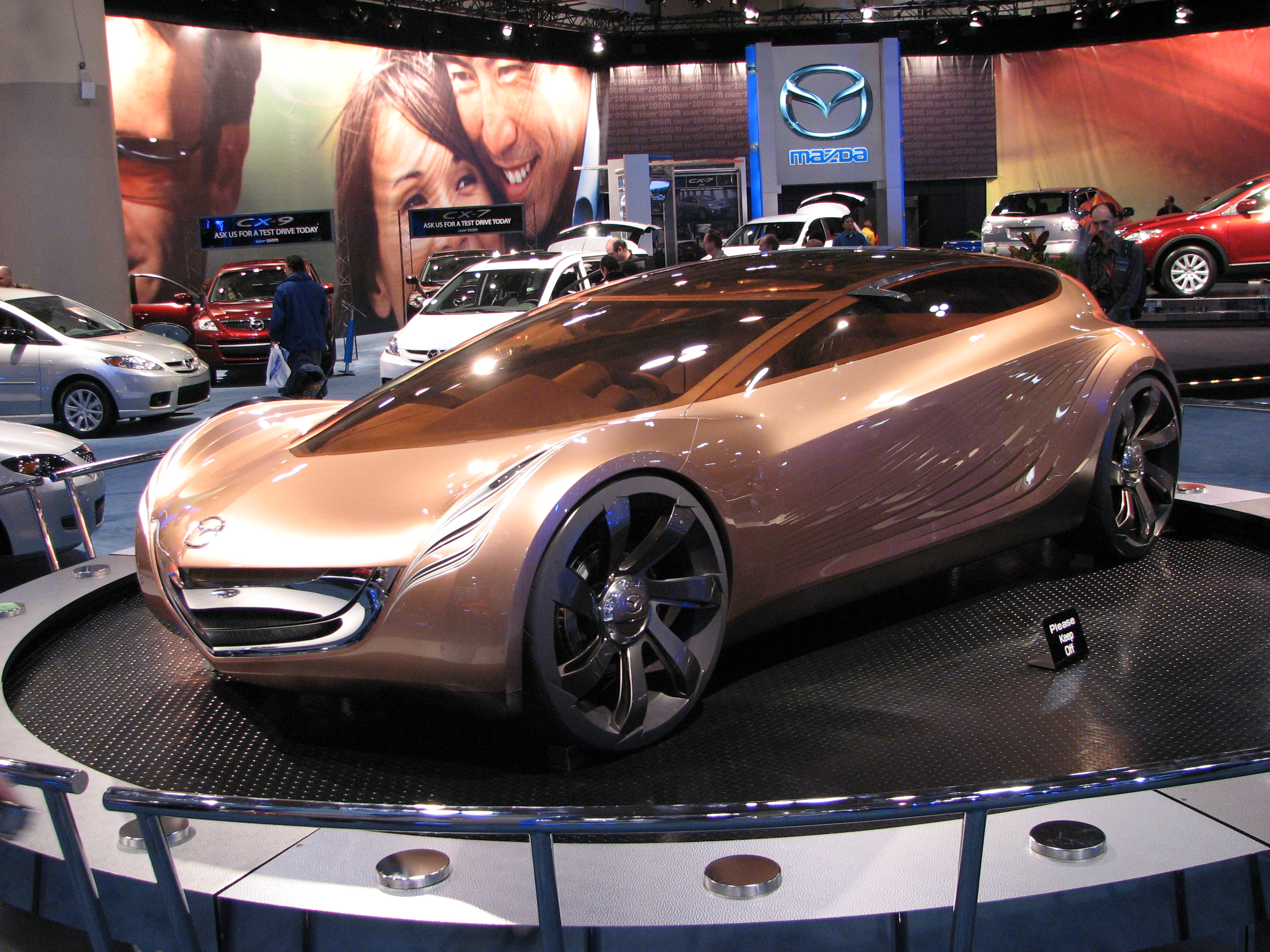
Nagare

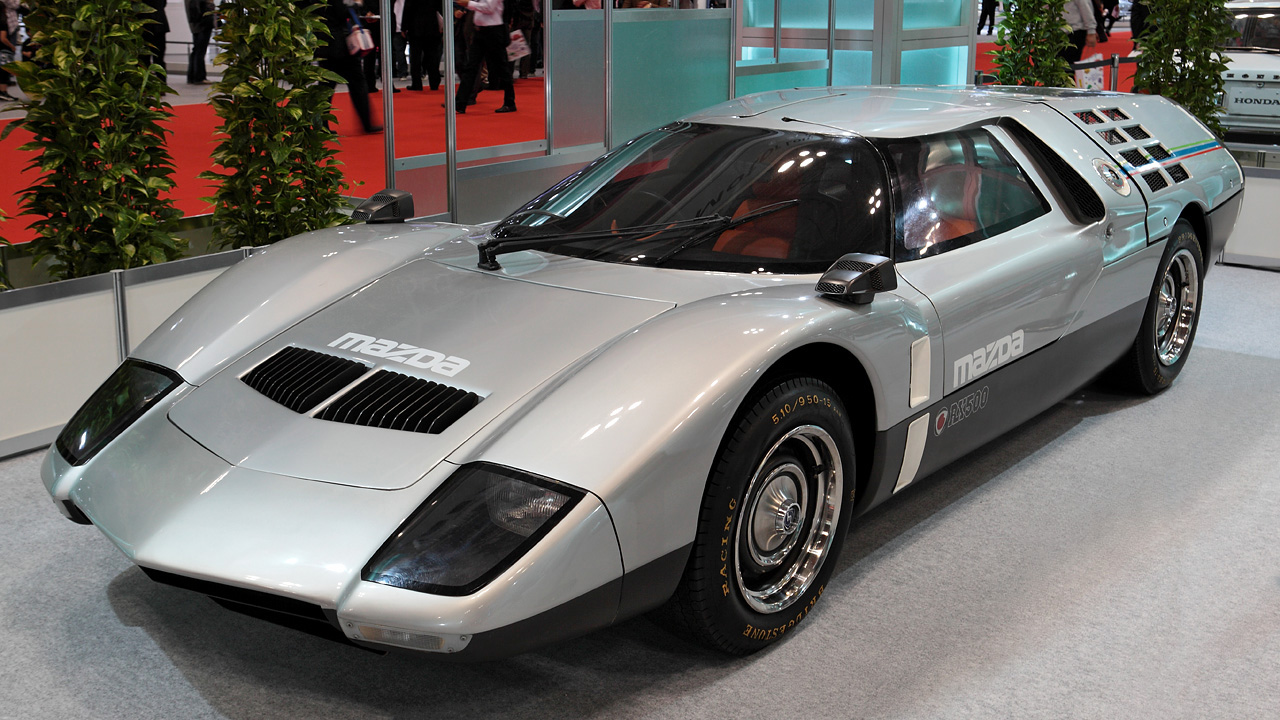
RX-500

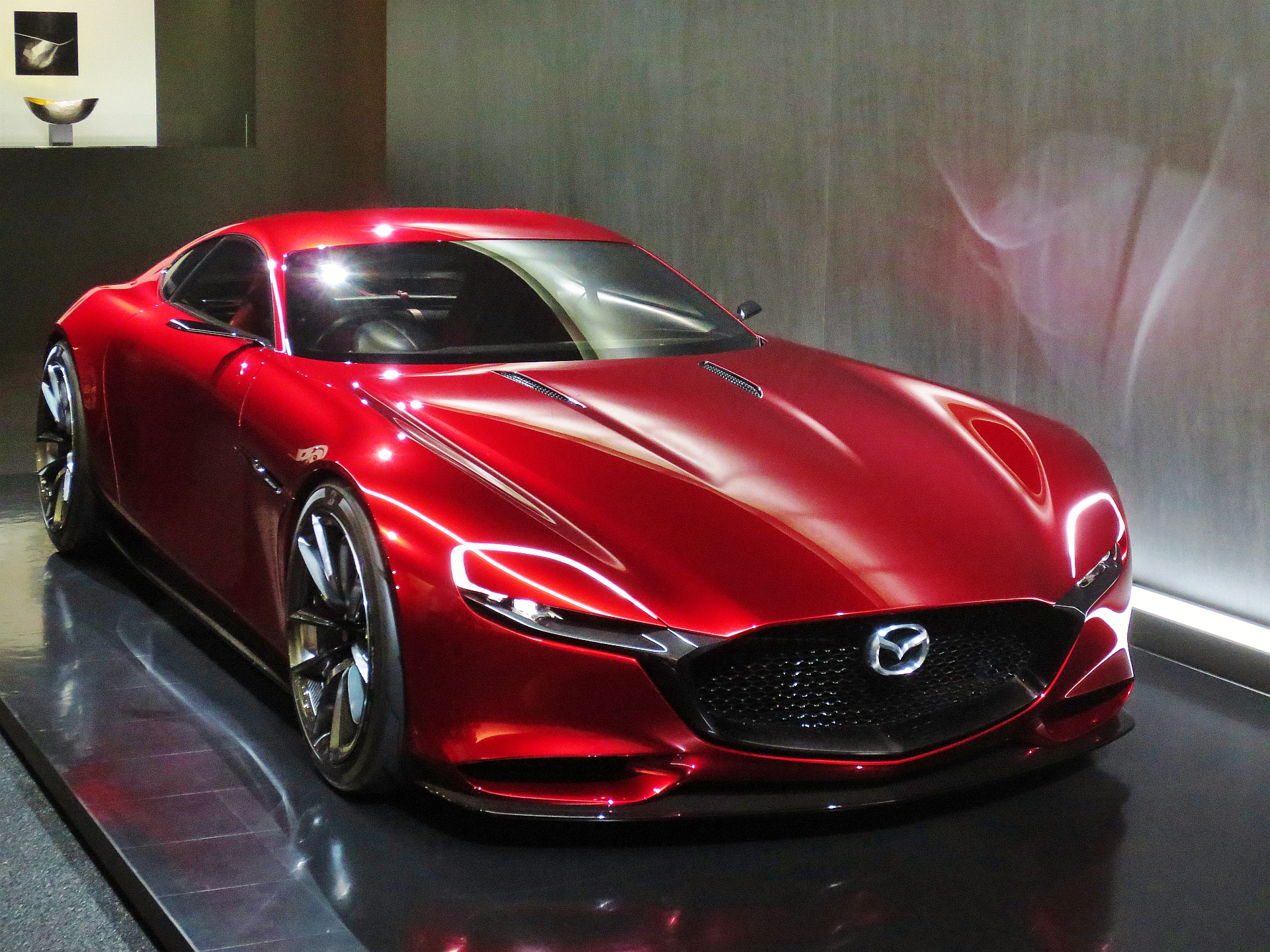
RX-Vision

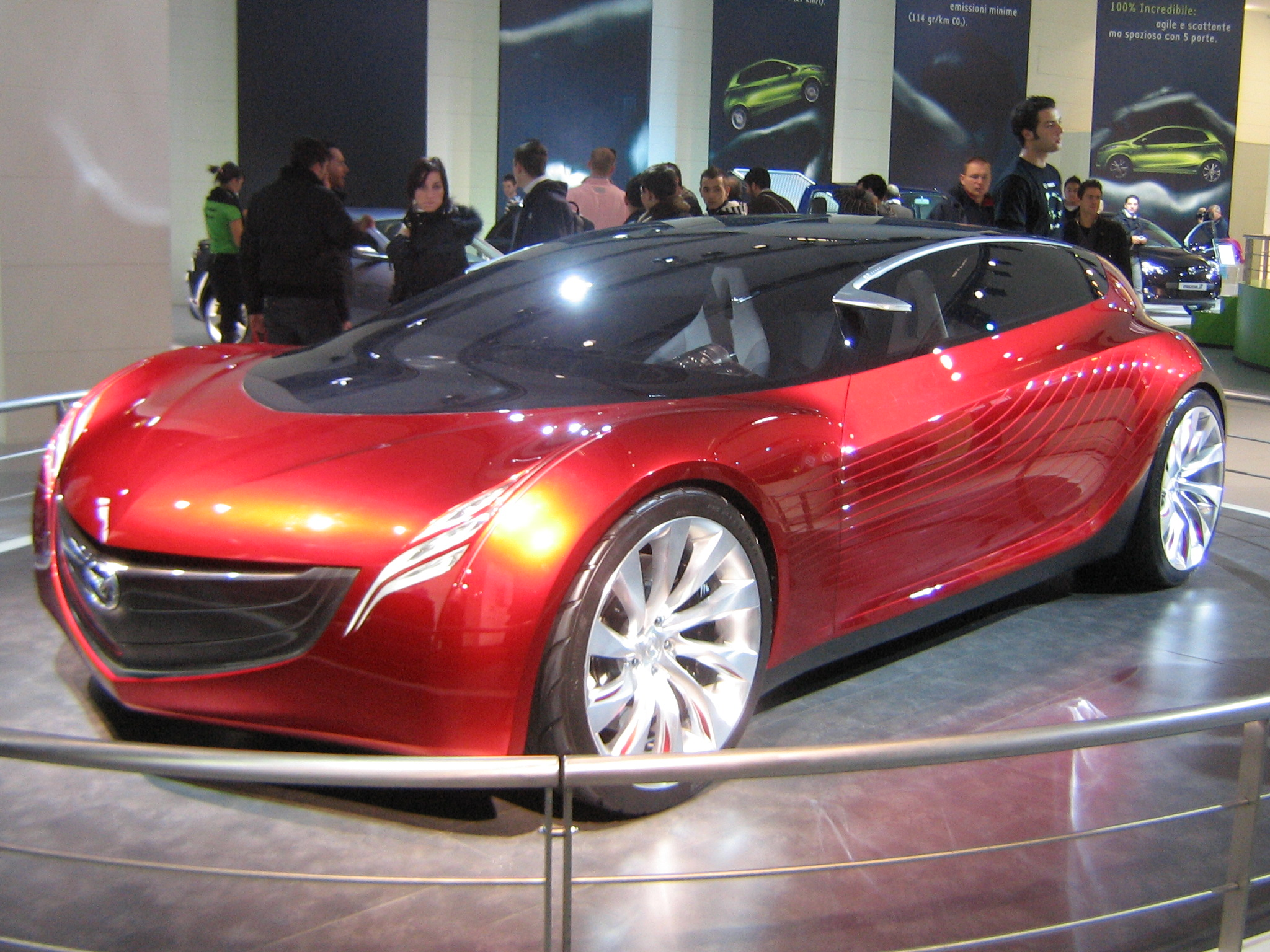
Ryuga

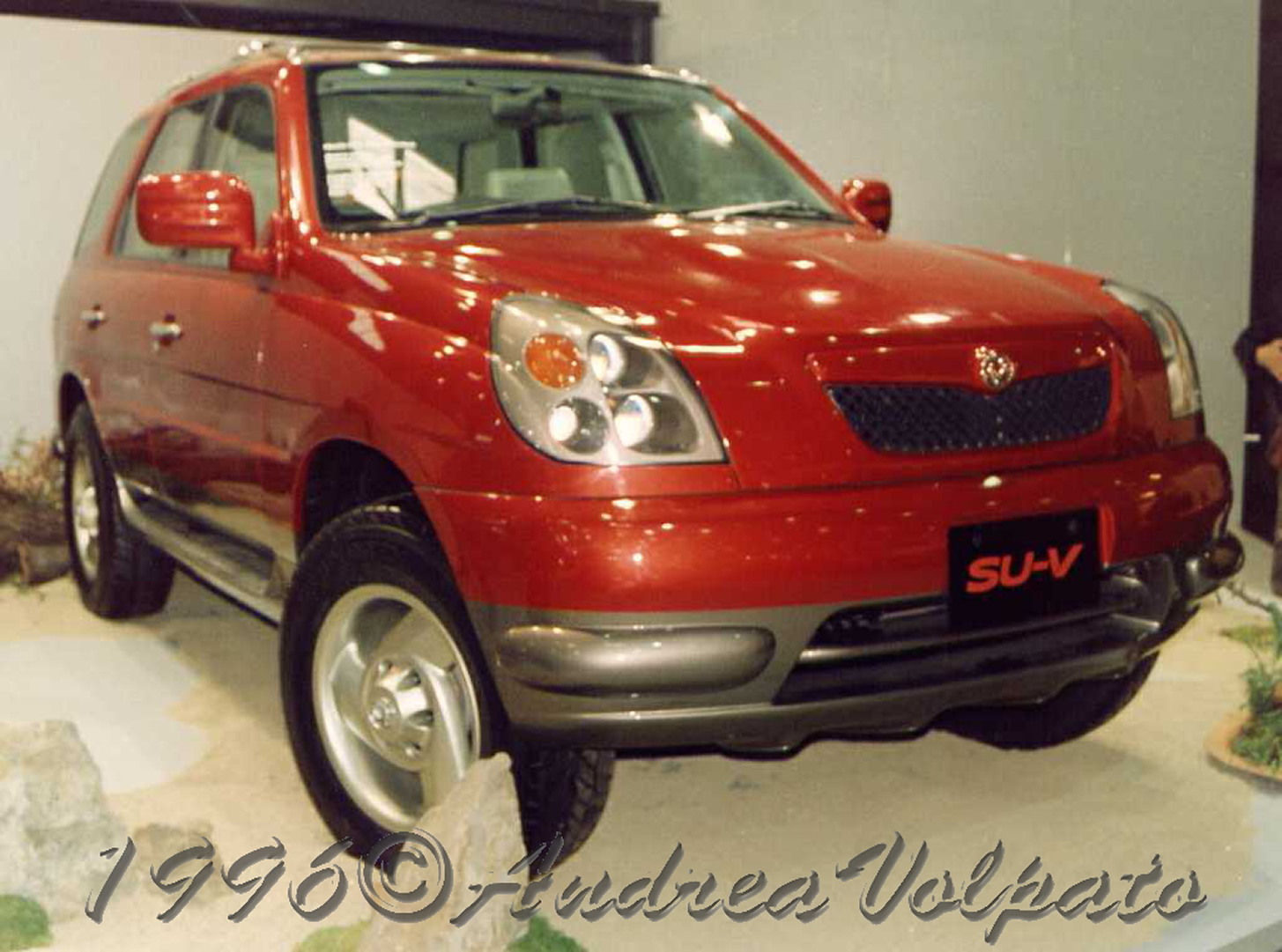
SU-V

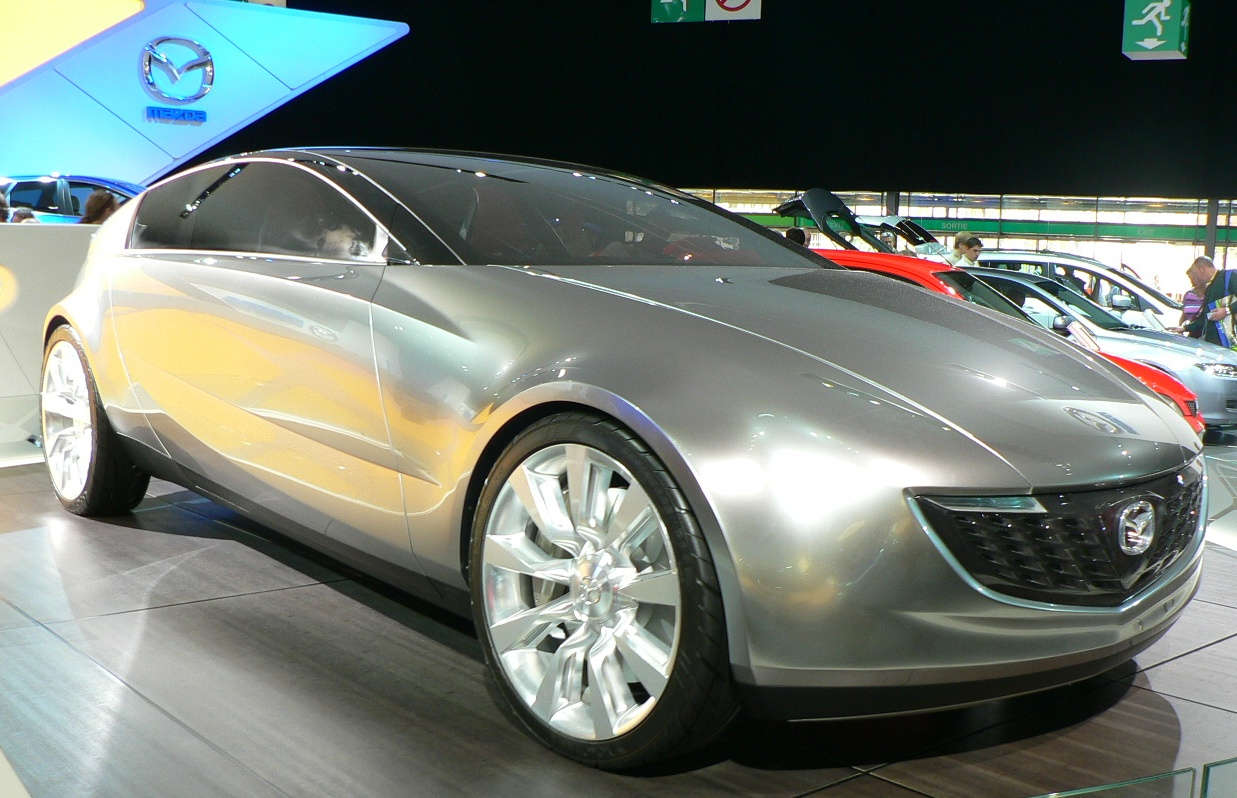
Senku

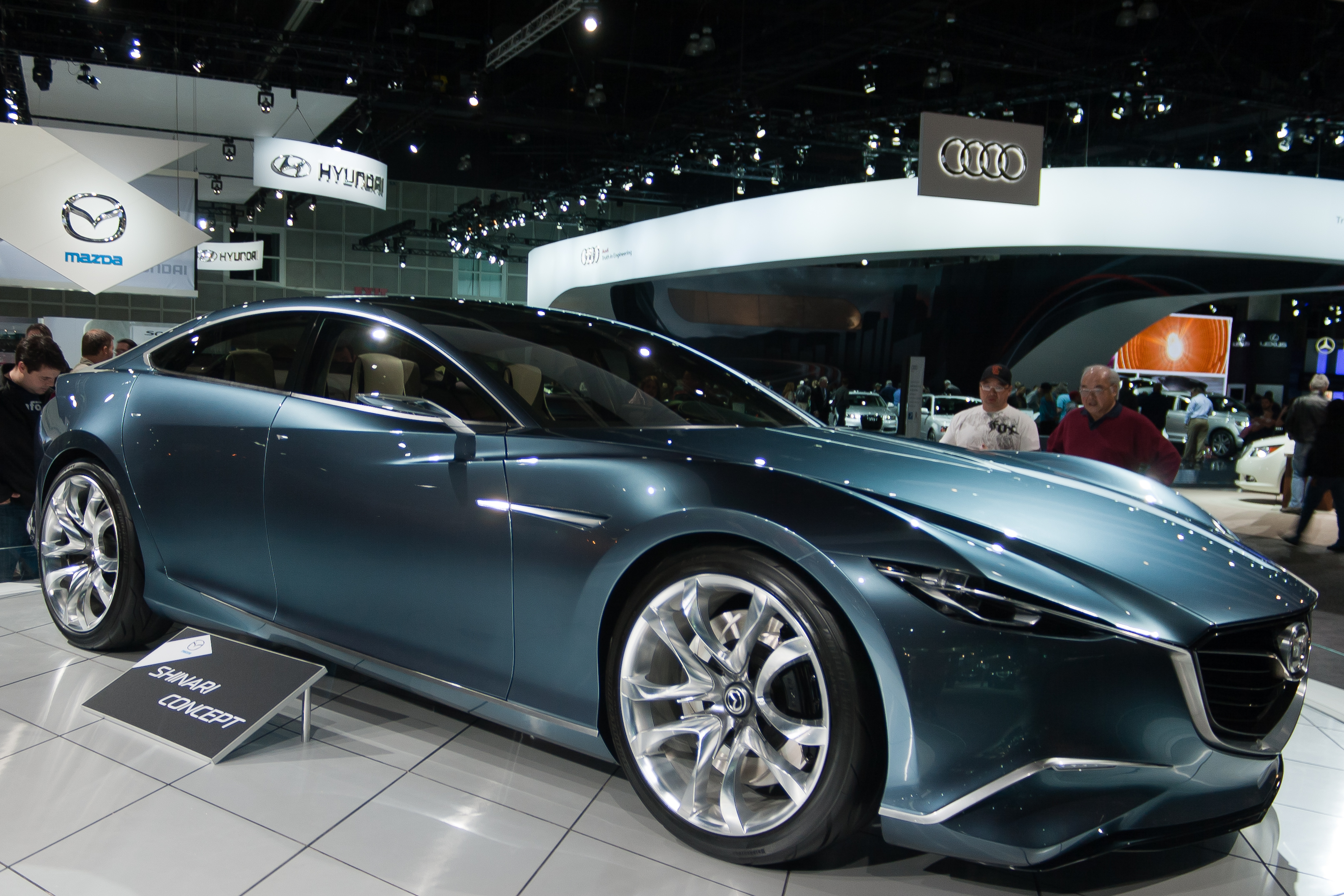
Shinari

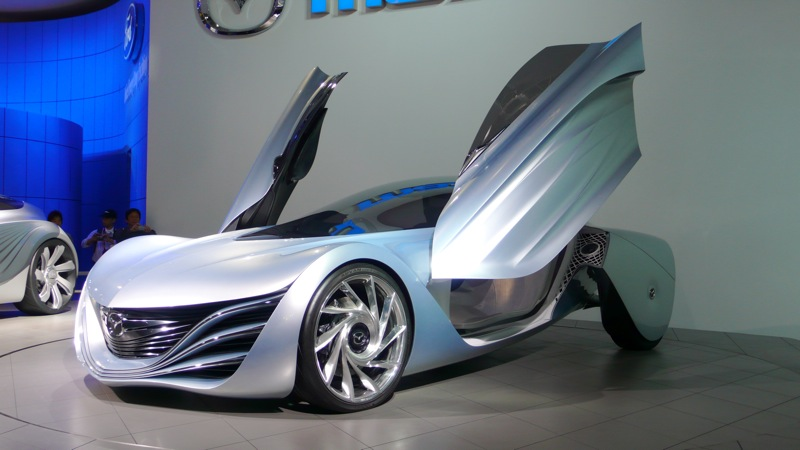
Taiki

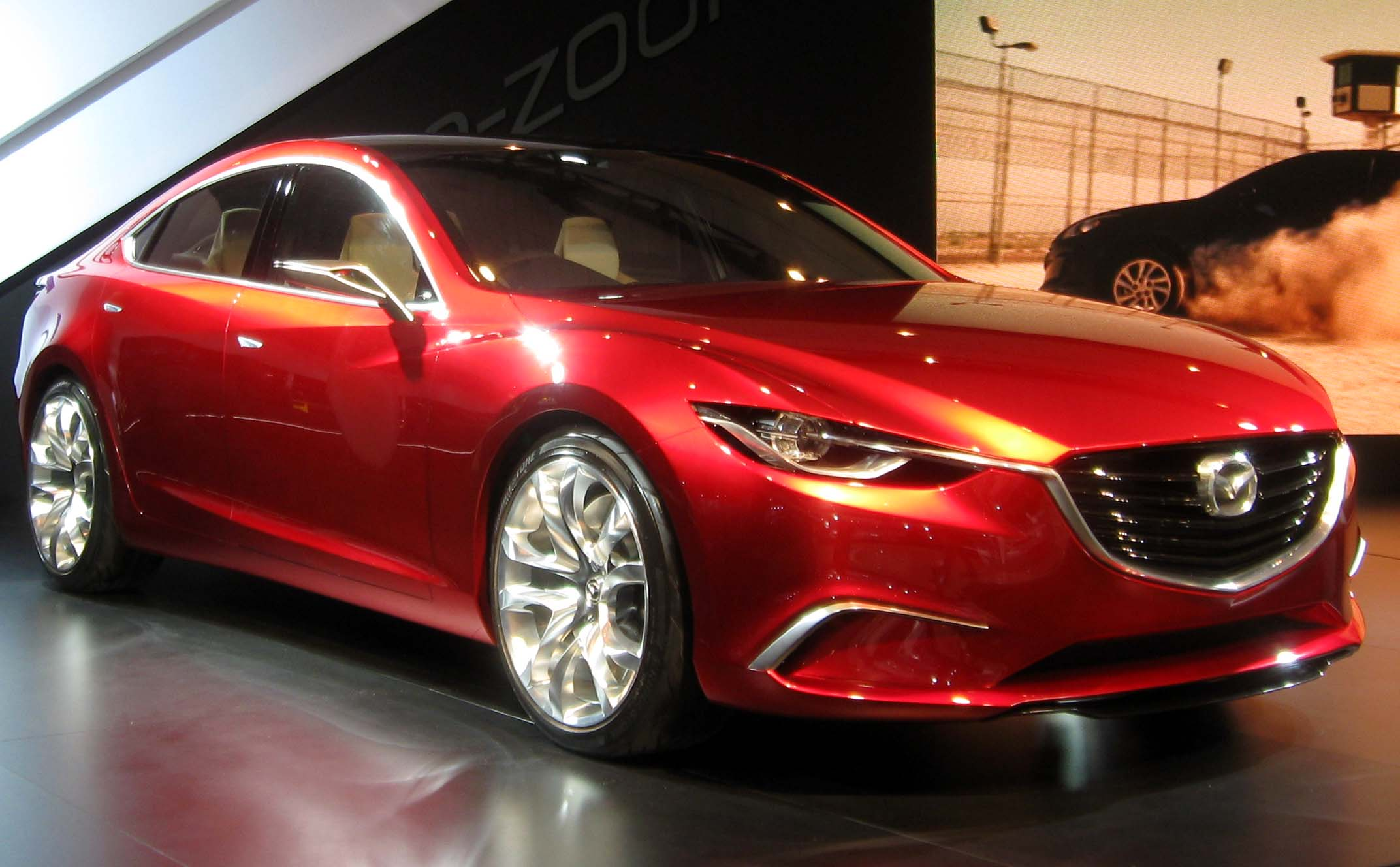
Takeri

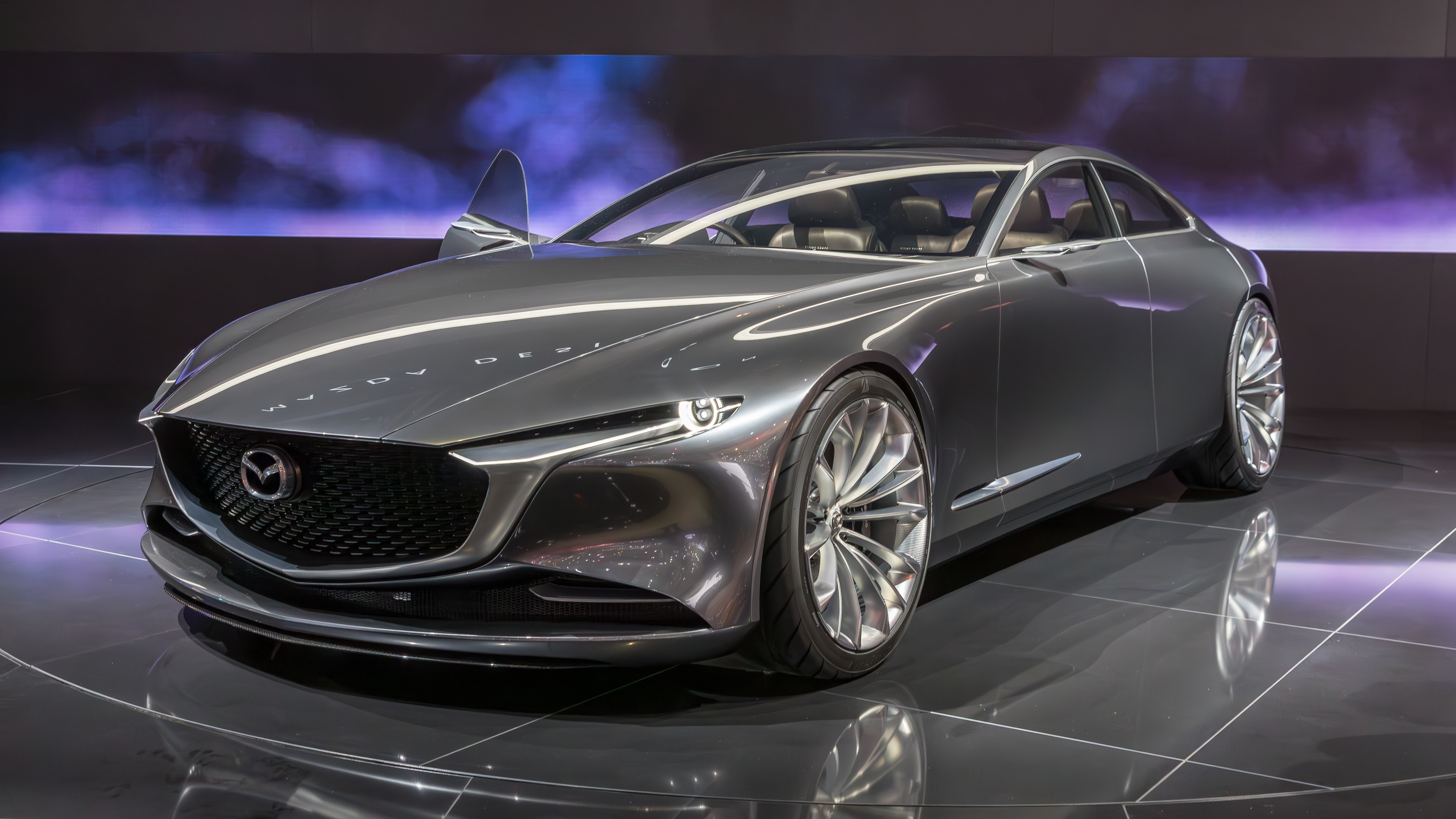
Vision Coupe

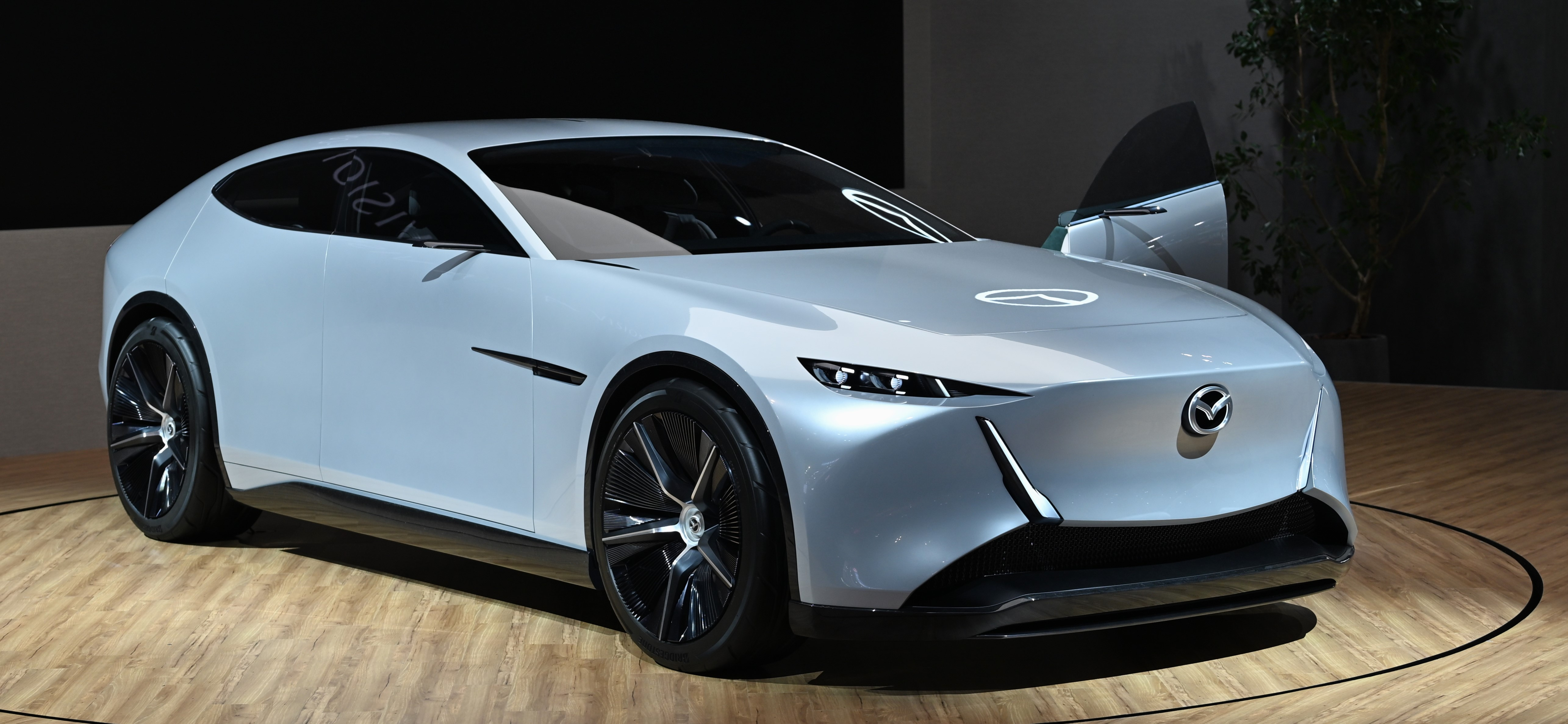
Vision X-Coupe

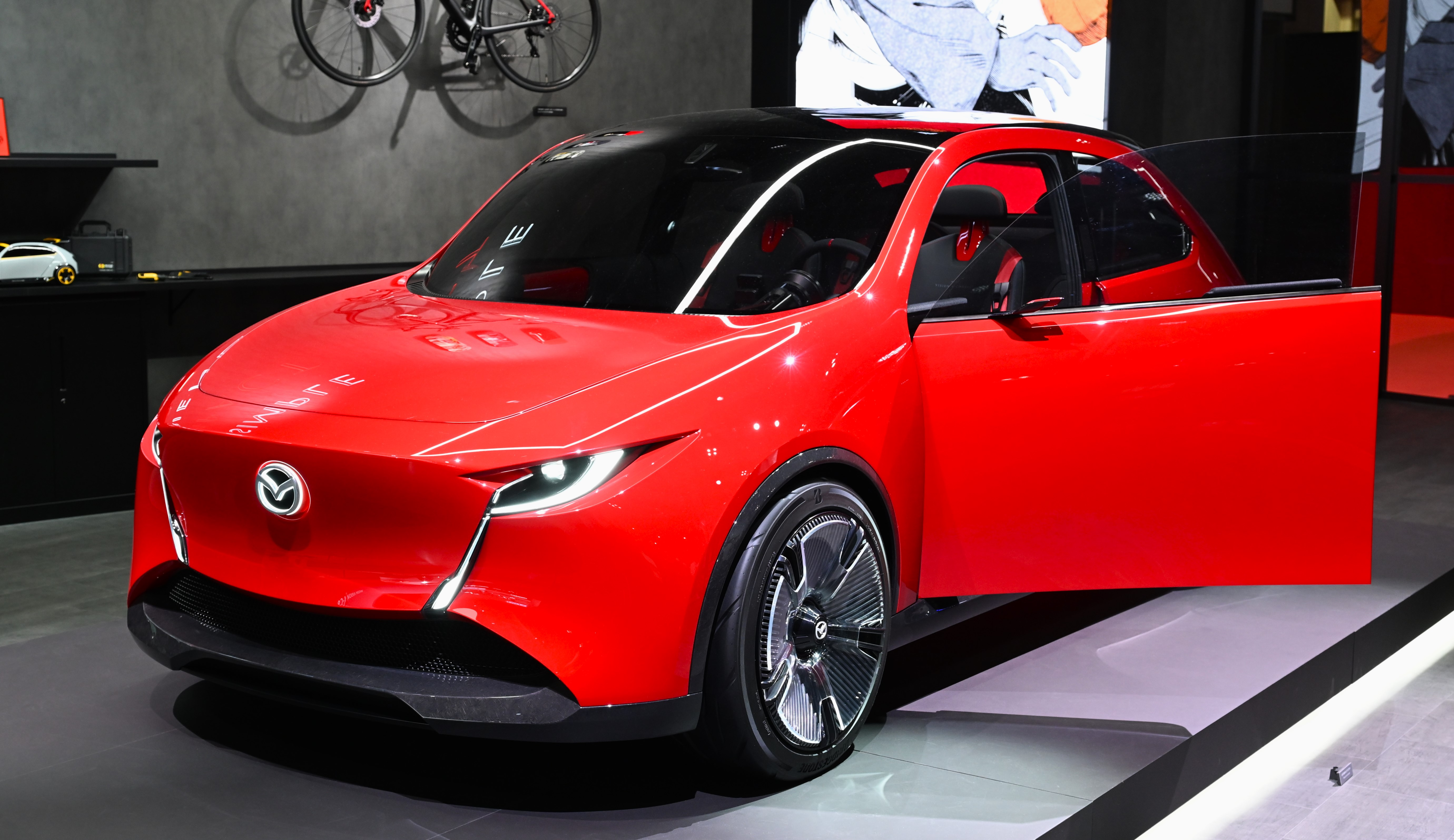
Vision X-Compact

== Other Mazda marques ==
=== Amati (cancelled) ===
- Amati 300 (Eunos 500)
- Amati 500 (Mazda Millenia)
- Amati 1000 (Mazda Sentia)

=== Autozam ===
- 1990–1994 Autozam Carol keicar (Suzuki Alto)
- 1990–1994 Autozam Revue subcompact car (Mazda 121)
- 1990–1994 Autozam Scrum microvan (Suzuki Carry)
- 1991–1994 Autozam AZ-3 coupe (Mazda MX-3)
- 1992–1993 Autozam Clef sedan (Mazda Capella)
- 1992–1994 Autozam AZ-1 mid-engine sports car

=== ɛ̃fini ===
- 1990–1997 ɛ̃fini MPV (Mazda MPV)
- 1991–1993 ɛ̃fini MS-6 (Mazda Cronos)
- 1992–1997 ɛ̃fini MS-8
- 1991–1993 ɛ̃fini MS-9 (Mazda 929)
- 1991–1996 ɛ̃fini RX-7 (Mazda RX-7)

=== Eunos ===
- 1989 Eunos 100 (Mazda Familia BG platform)
- 1989 Eunos 300 (Mazda Persona MA platform)
- 1992–1993 Eunos 500 (Mazda Xedos 6 CA platform)
- 1993–1996 Eunos 800 (Mazda Millenia TA platform)
- 1990 Eunos Cargo (SS platform)
- 1990–1991 Eunos Cosmo (Mazda Cosmo JC platform)
- 1991–1993 Eunos Presso/Eunos 30X (Mazda MX-3 EC platform)
- 1989–1996 Eunos Roadster (Mazda MX-5 NA platform)

=== Xedos ===
- 1993–1999 Xedos 6 (Eunos 500)
- 1993–2002 Xedos 9 (Mazda Millenia)

== See also ==
- List of Mazda platforms
- List of Mazda engines
- Mazda
