= Nissan E-4WD =

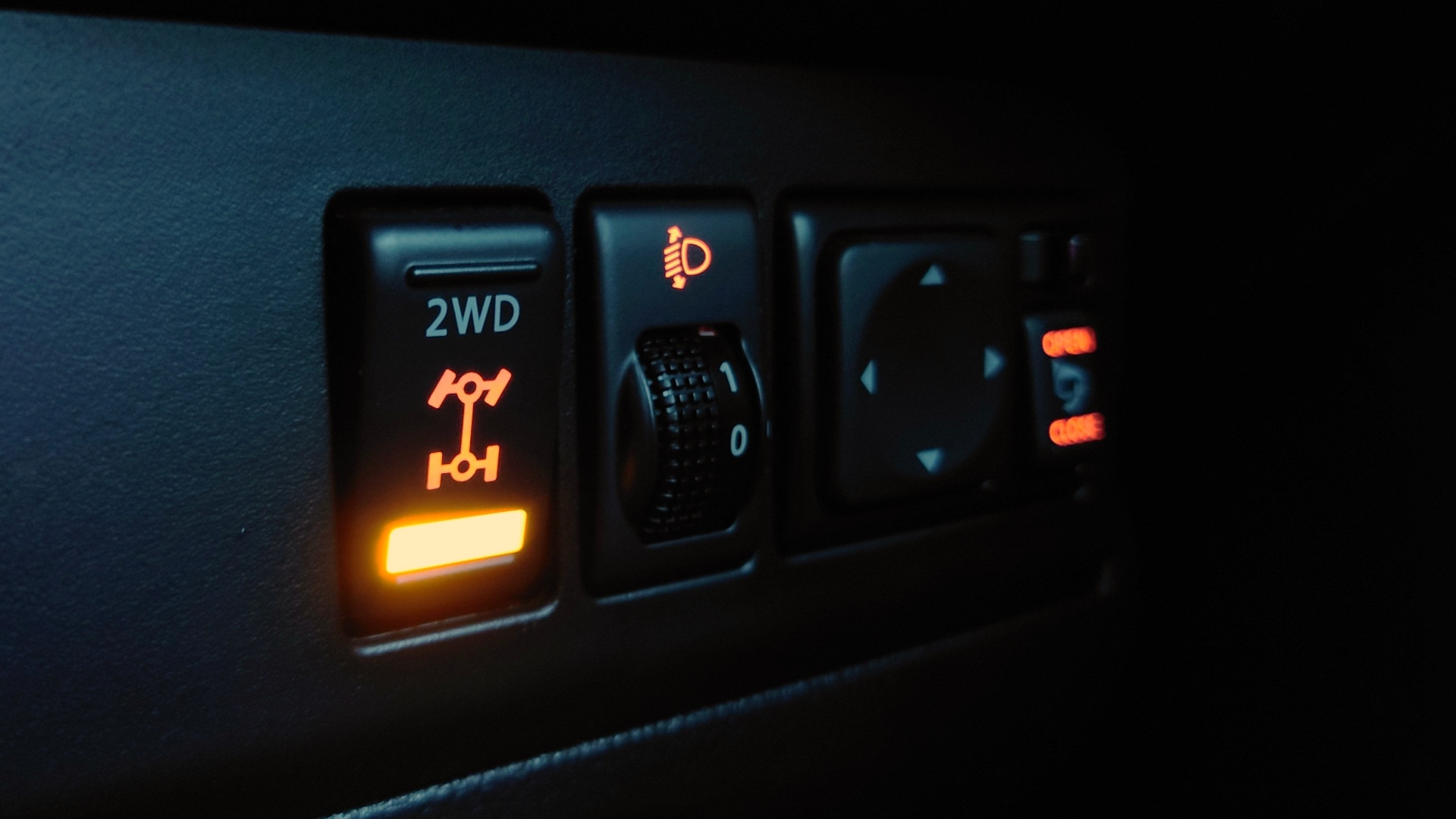
E-4WD switch for the Nissan Note (E11 model) four-wheel drive vehicle.

E-4WD is a system used by Nissan that drives two rear wheels with an electric motor to supplement the traction available to a front wheel drive vehicle. This avoids the complication of installing a drive shaft to transfer power to the rear wheels. It also increases efficiency as when additional traction is not needed the rear wheels can be completely disengaged from the drive train. The system was developed by Hitachi.

== Vehicles ==
=== Nissan ===
- March/Micra (3, 4 generations)
- Cube (2,3 second generation)
- Cube Cubic
- Tiida
- Tiida Latio (only first)
- Note
- Bluebird Sylphy (only second generation)
- Wingroad (third generation)

=== Mazda ===
- Mazda Demio/Mazda 2 (DE; second generation)
- Mazda Demio/Mazda 2 (DJ; third generation)
- Verisa

== See also ==
- ja:E-4WD
