= Volvo Tundra =

Concept car manufactured by Bertone

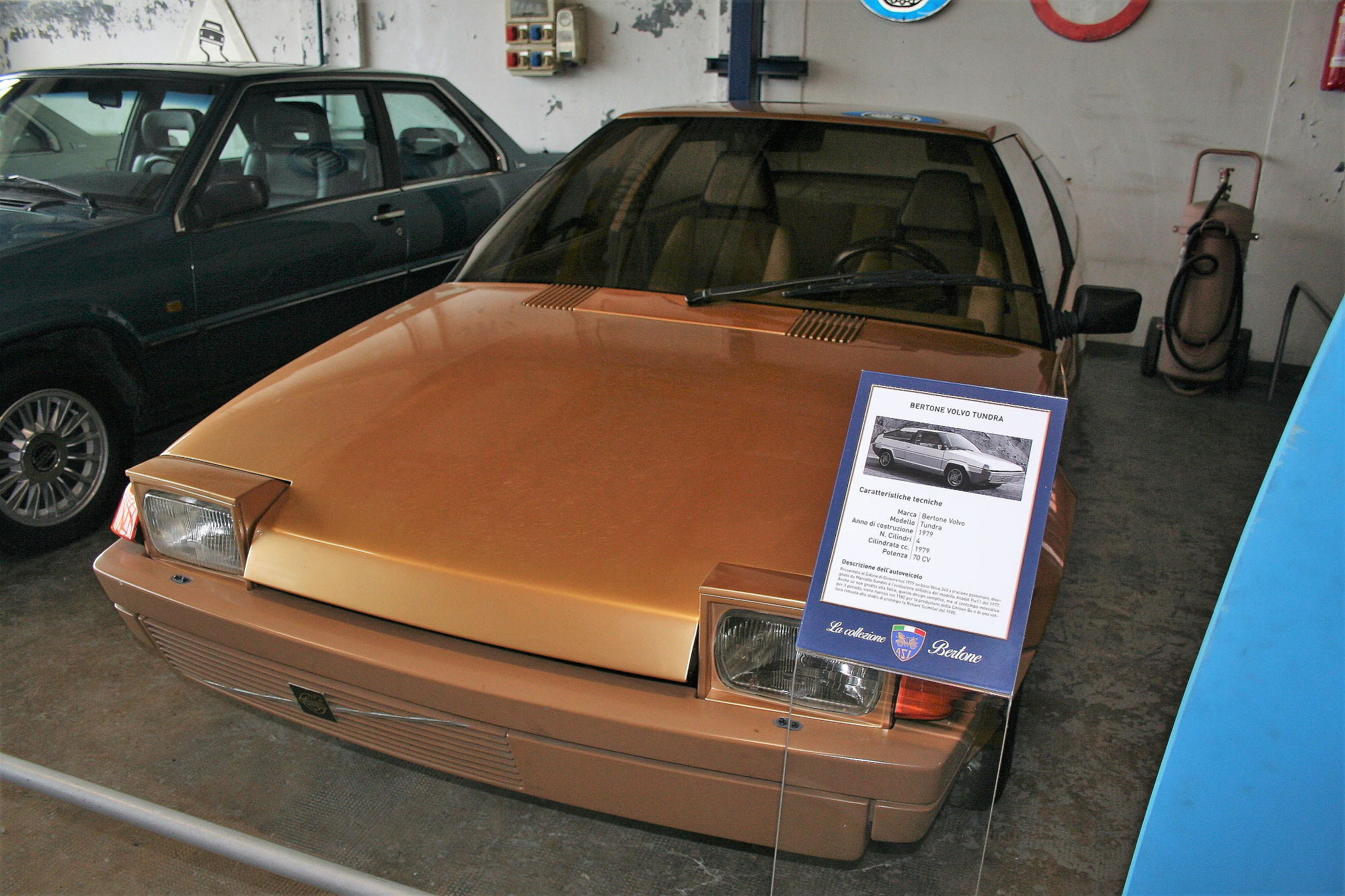
- Volvo Tundra in the Bertone Collection

Overview
- Manufacturer: Bertone
- Also called: Bertone Tundra
- Production: 1979 (1 concept car)
- Designer: Marcello Gandini at Bertone

Body and chassis
- Class: Concept car
- Body style: 3-door hatchback coupé
- Related: Volvo 343

Powertrain
- Engine: 1,397 cc (1.4 L; 85.3 cu in) B14 OHV inline-4

Dimensions
- Length: 4,023 mm (158.4 in)
- Width: 1,710 mm (67.3 in)
- Height: 1,277 mm (50.3 in)

The Volvo Tundra is a concept car built and designed by Bertone in 1979.

== Design ==
Bertone's design prompt was to do "something delicious" based on the Volvo 343. The angular design was by Marcello Gandini, and continued the themes developed for the Lamborghini Silhouette and the Reliant (Anadol) FW11. It was rejected by Volvo, who considered the design too modern and deemed it difficult to market.

It is often misreported that Bertone instead sold a very similar design to Citroën, where it was produced as the Citroën BX from 1982 to 1994. However, this would have meant Citroën turned a concept into a series production model in less than 18 months. The relationship is simply that the two designs appeared from the same design house.

The Tundra's rear-side window had a pulled-down top edge, an idea also seen on the BX C-pillar. The effect was of a floating roof, a design idea that would become popular in the 2010s.

Many styling cues from the Tundra, including the color scheme, would be reused by Bertone two years later on the Mazda MX-81.

== Specifications ==
The Tundra was powered by the same 1.4 litre four-cylinder engine as the 343, producing 70 PS (51 kW) and sending power to the rear wheels. The interior of the car featured an electronic instrument cluster.
