= Mazda EX-005 =

Overview
- Manufacturer: Mazda
- Also called: Mazda EX005
- Production: 1970 (concept car)
- Assembly: Japan
- Designer: Kenichi Yamamoto

Body and chassis
- Class: Microcar
- Body style: 4-seat
- Doors: 0 (open-air design)

Powertrain
- Engine: Single-rotor rotary

Dimensions
- Length: 2,330 mm (92 in)
- Width: 1,450 mm (57 in)
- Height: 1,590 mm (63 in)

The Mazda EX-005 (Japanese: マツダEX005ハイブリッド) was a concept microcar made by Mazda in 1970. It was shown at the 1970 Tokyo Motor Show. It was steered by a joystick, and was the size of an office chair. The EX-005 was designed to be an urban commuter car, but due to a lack of comfort, space, and safety, the EX-005 stayed a concept vehicle and never made production.
