= Mazda Verisa =

Subcompact car

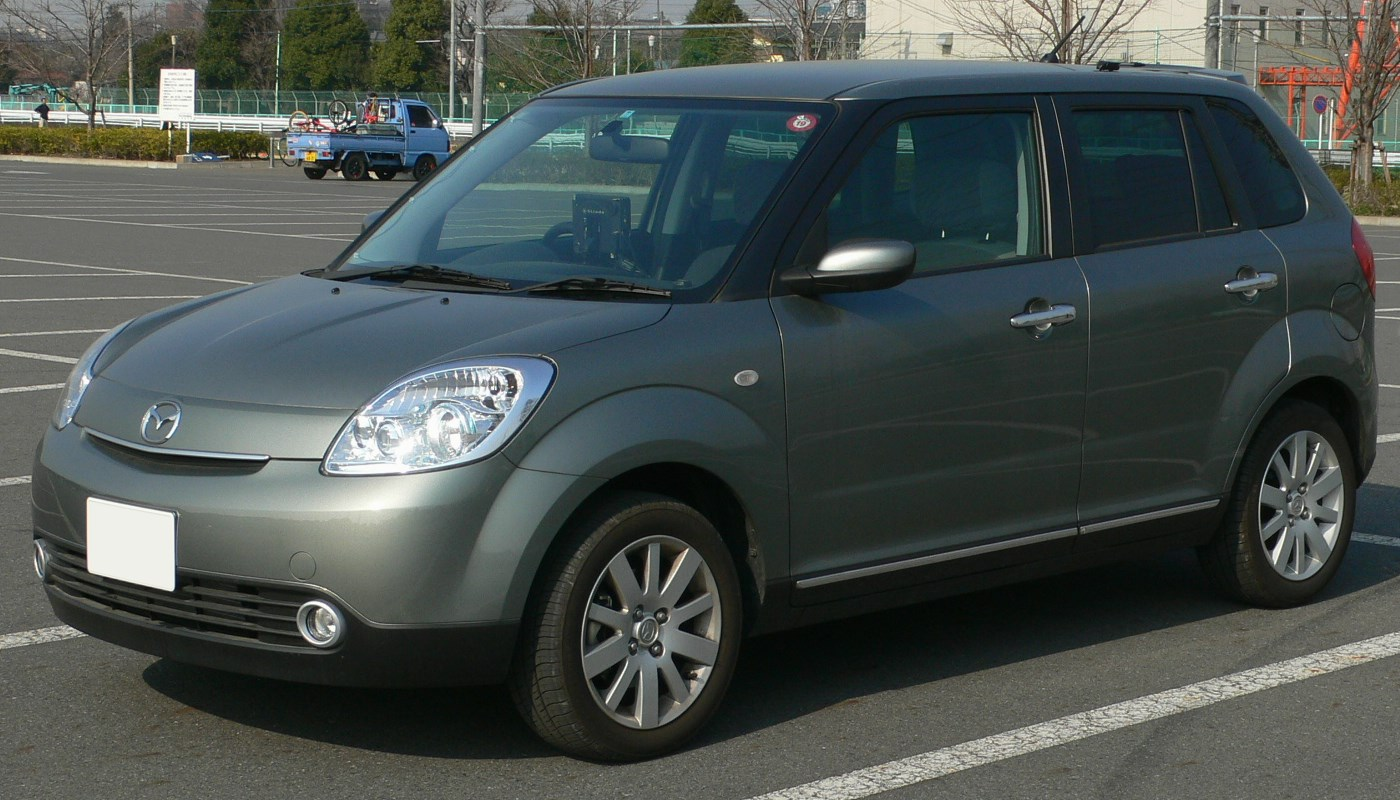

Overview
- Manufacturer: Mazda
- Production: 2004–2015
- Assembly: Japan: Hofu, Yamaguchi (Hofu Plant)

Body and chassis
- Class: Subcompact car / mini MPV
- Body style: 5-door hatchback
- Platform: Mazda DY platform

Dimensions
- Wheelbase: 2,490 mm (98.0 in)
- Length: 3,975 mm (156.5 in)
- Width: 1,695 mm (66.7 in)
- Height: 1,530 mm (60.2 in)

Chronology
- Successor: Mazda2/Demio (DJ)

The Mazda Verisa is a subcompact car based on the jointly engineered Mazda DY platform. It was launched by Mazda in 2004 and was only available in Japan, although used Verisas were exported to international markets. The Verisa can be considered either a 'tall hatchback' or a 'low mini MPV'. Its height of 1,530 mm (60.2 in) is similar to other Japanese boxy subcompact cars and lower than European mini MPVs like the Fiat Idea and Opel Meriva. The Verisa was previewed at the 2004 North American International Auto Show in Detroit as the Mazda MX Micro-Sport, although it was never sold there.

According to Mazda the name Verisa was created by combining the Italian word 'verità' (truth) with the English word 'satisfaction', and the intended result of the term Verisa is to signify 'true fulfillment'. The car is built with the watchwords "simple, quality and compact" and is targeted towards couples in their 30s with individual style and values. The Verisa was available with a variety of factory and dealer-fitted options.

The Verisa comes in front-wheel drive (2WD) and electronic four-wheel drive (e4WD) configurations. There is one engine option that delivers the following power and efficiency figures:

- Power = 113 PS (83 kW; 111 hp) at 6,000 rpm
- Torque = 140 N⋅m (103 lb⋅ft) at 4,000 rpm
- Fuel consumption (2WD) = 5.5 L/100 km combined
- CO_{2} (2WD) = 126.2 g/km
- Fuel consumption (e4WD) = 5.8 L/100 km combined
- CO_{2} (e4WD) = 135 g/km

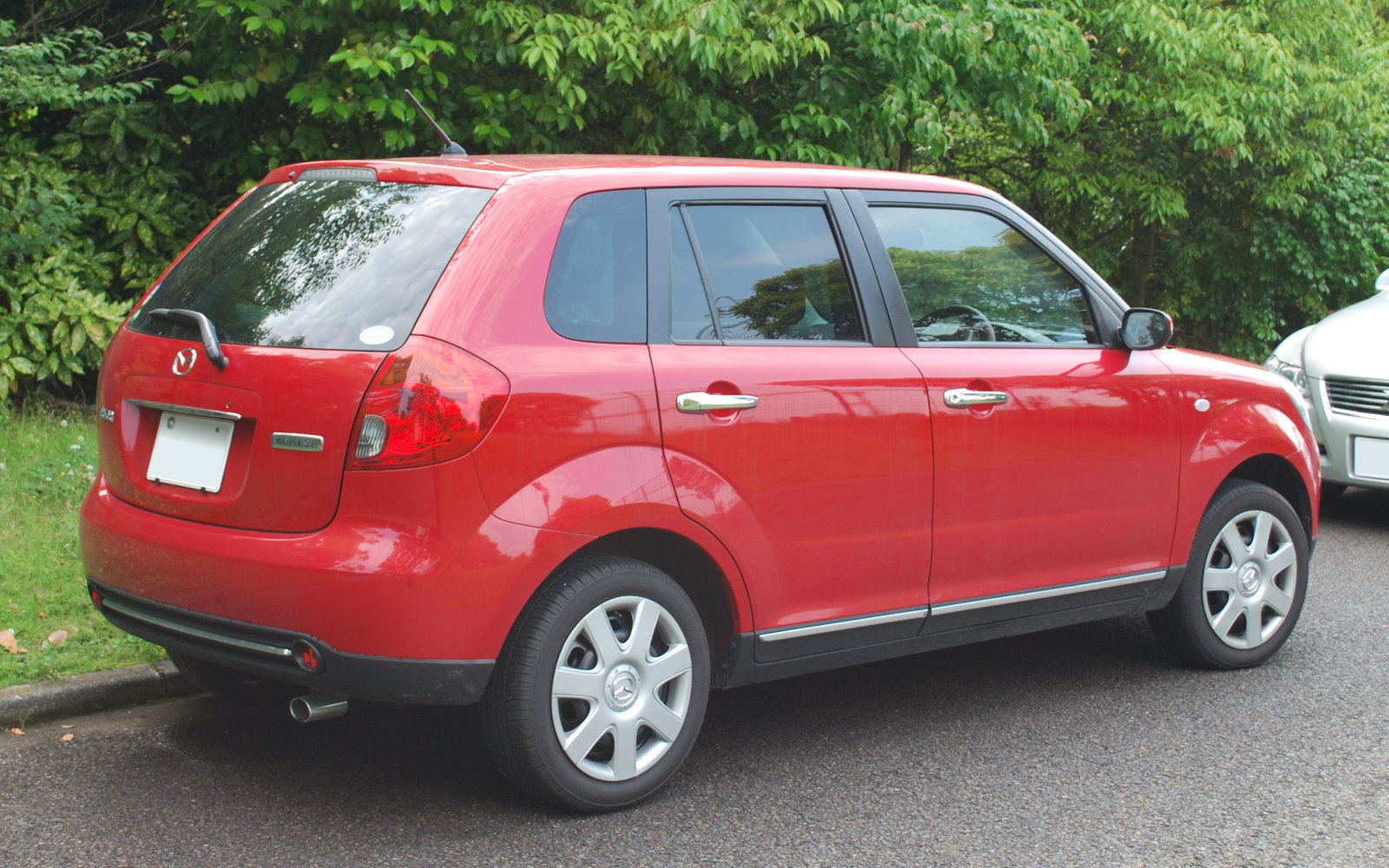
Rear view

In financial year 2004 Mazda produced 19,473 and sold 18,526 units. In financial year 2005 Mazda produced 14,336 and sold 14,416 units. The summary information for financial year 2006 and onwards was not published on the Mazda website. However, month by month breakdowns for domestic sales of individual car models are available.

The Verisa received updates in 2006 and 2009. Two special editions of the car have been released, the 'Brown Collection' in 2005 and the 'Stylish V' in 2007. The car has gained international admirers who question why it has not been made more widely available.
