= Mazda Vision Coupe =

Concept car by Mazda

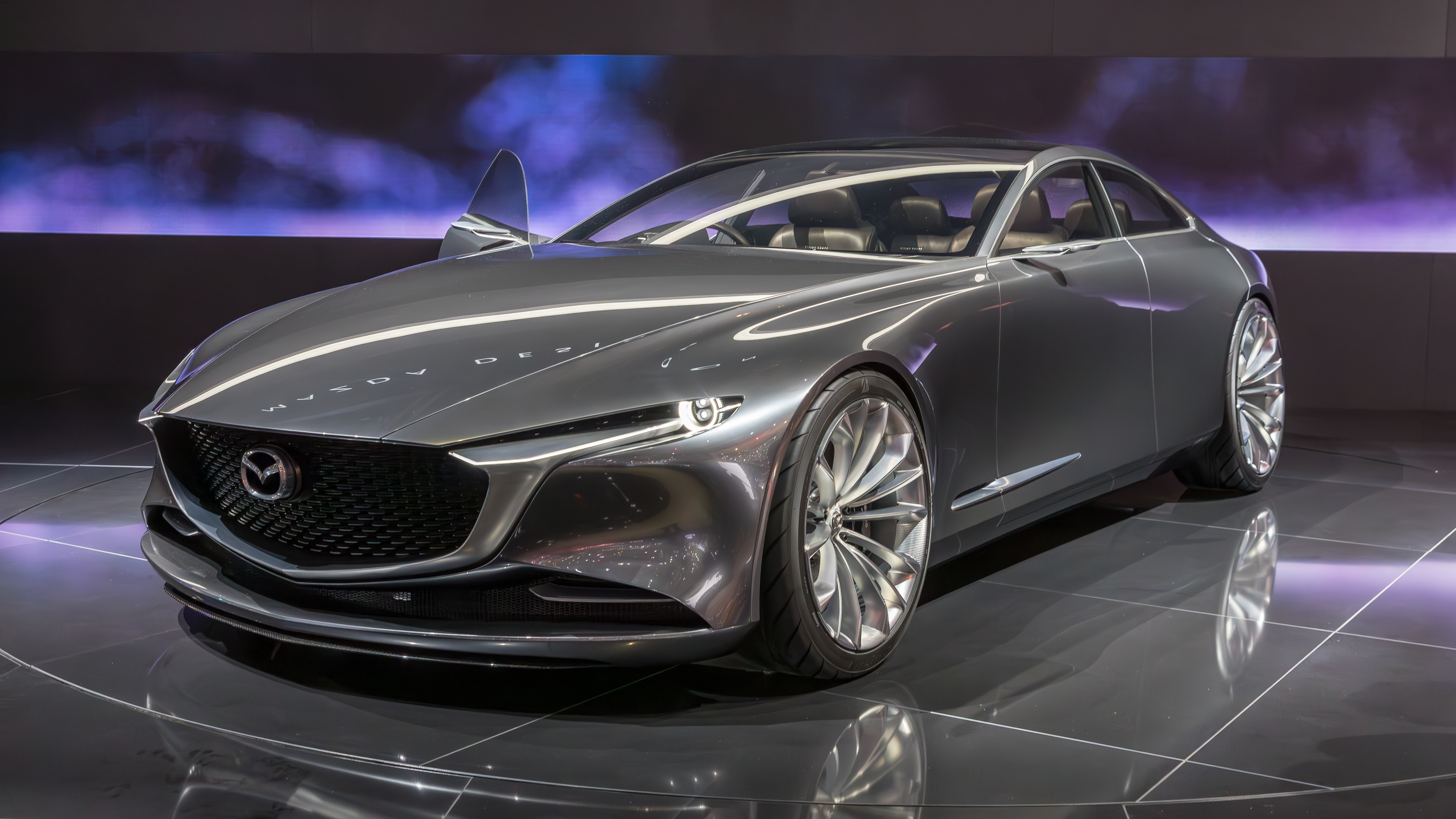

Overview
- Manufacturer: Mazda
- Production: 2017

Body and chassis
- Class: Concept car

The Mazda Vision Coupe is a concept car developed by the Japanese car manufacturer Mazda, unveiled at the Tokyo Motor Show in 2017.

It succeeds the Mazda RX-Vision concept and its design embodies Mazda's "Kodo" style. It takes the form of a long, four-door coupé, features a full panoramic roof, and previews future production models.

The Vision Coupe was voted the most beautiful concept car of the year at the Paris Motor Show and again in March at the International Automobile Festival. It received this award at the 11th Geneva Car Design Night.
