= Mazda MX-81 =

Concept car designed by Bertone for Mazda

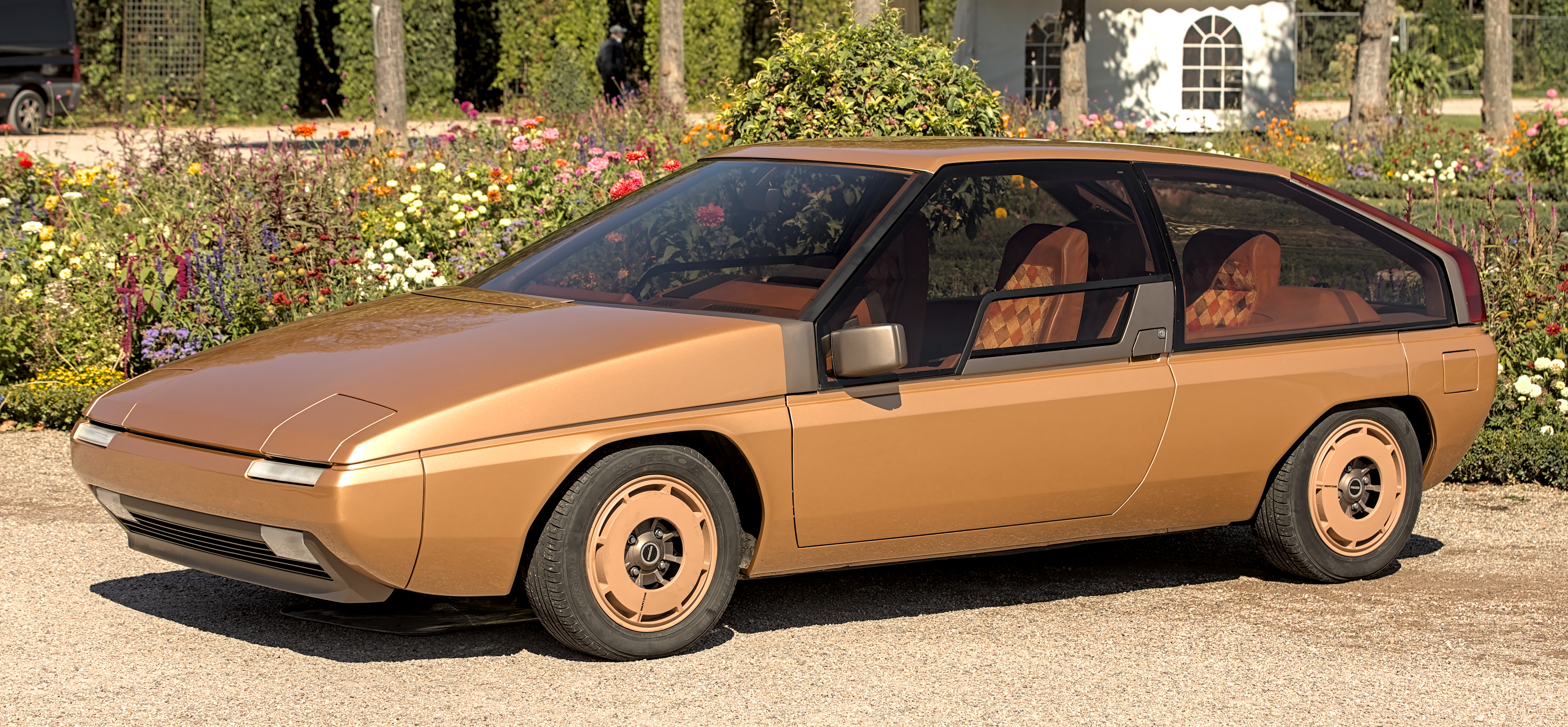

Overview
- Manufacturer: Mazda
- Production: 1981
- Designer: Marc Deschamps at Bertone

Body and chassis
- Class: Concept car
- Body style: 3-door hatchback

The Mazda MX-81 is a concept car designed by Bertone for the Japanese car manufacturer Mazda, presented in 1981. The car was designed by Marc Deschamps.

== Overview ==
The MX-81 is based on the Mazda 323, a small family car, and was first presented at the Tokyo Motor Show in 1981. The design of the MX-81 took many design cues, including its color scheme, from Bertone's prior Volvo Tundra concept, introduced two years earlier. According to the factory, this was the first Mazda to use the prefix "MX", which stands for "Mazda Experimental". The Astina/323F, which came out in 1989, used many concepts of the MX-81.

The MX-81 is equipped with a 1.5-liter turbocharged engine with an output of 130 horsepower. The exterior of the car features a hatchback design with pop-up headlights, an all glass hatch, and large fixed glass windows, with only a small section of glass on the doors being able to roll down.

The interior of the concept is most notable for its distinctive steering wheel, which is a rounded rectangle in shape, and has buttons and a CRT television screen, which replaces traditional gauges, built into the center of the assembly. Unlike a traditional steering wheel, the steering assembly does not rotate. Instead, it features a belt mechanism, with a ring of black rubber nubs and a fabric covering the belt, which slide around a track on the gauge pod. The rest of the interior features a mix of leather and patterned faux suede upholstery, with rotating front seats.

After many years in a warehouse at the factory headquarters in Hiroshima, around the year 2020, the MX-81 was sent to a workshop near Bertone's premises in Turin, Italy to be restored.

== Gallery ==
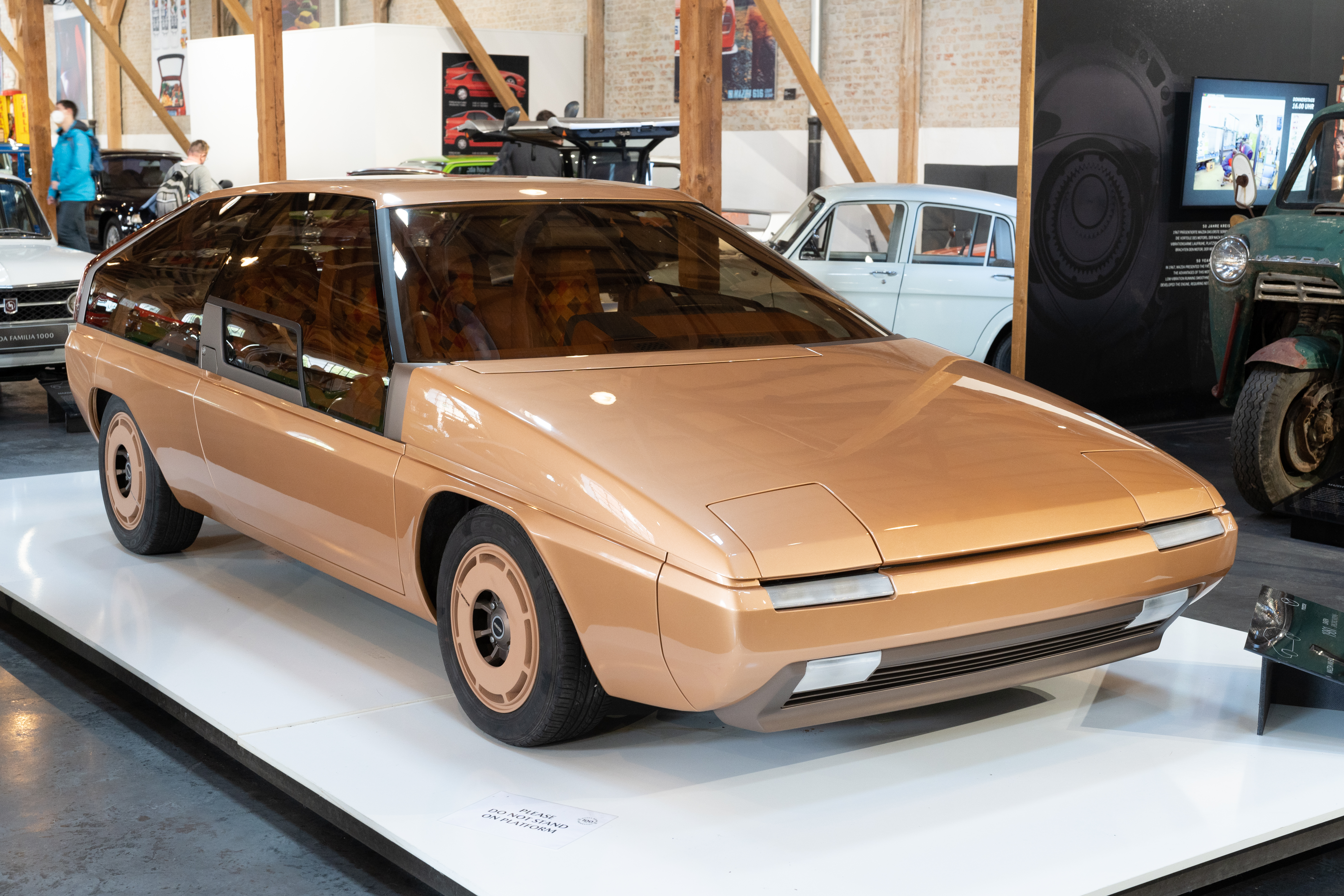
Mazda MX-81 at the Mazda Museum in Augsburg

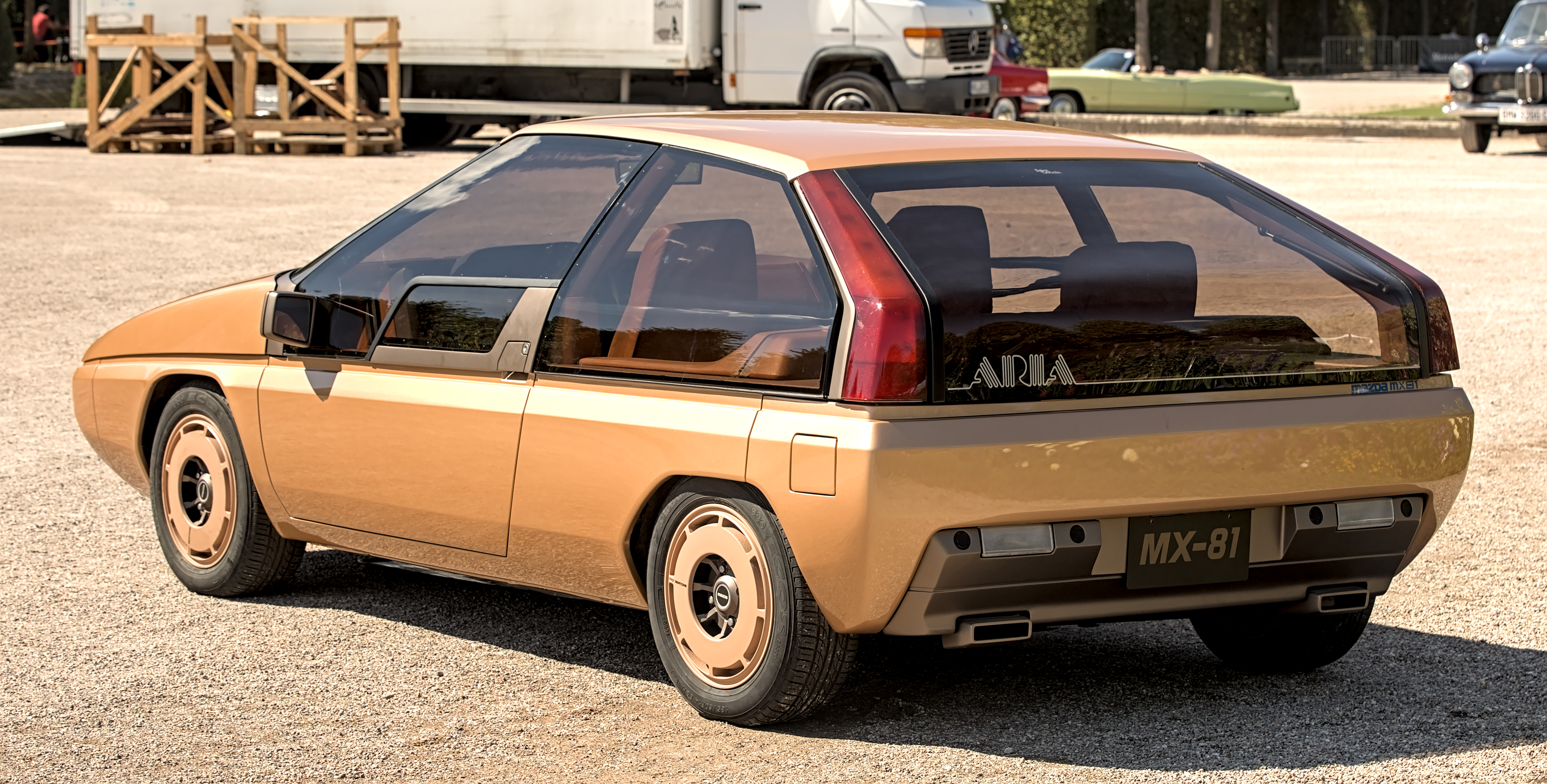
Mazda MX-81 rear

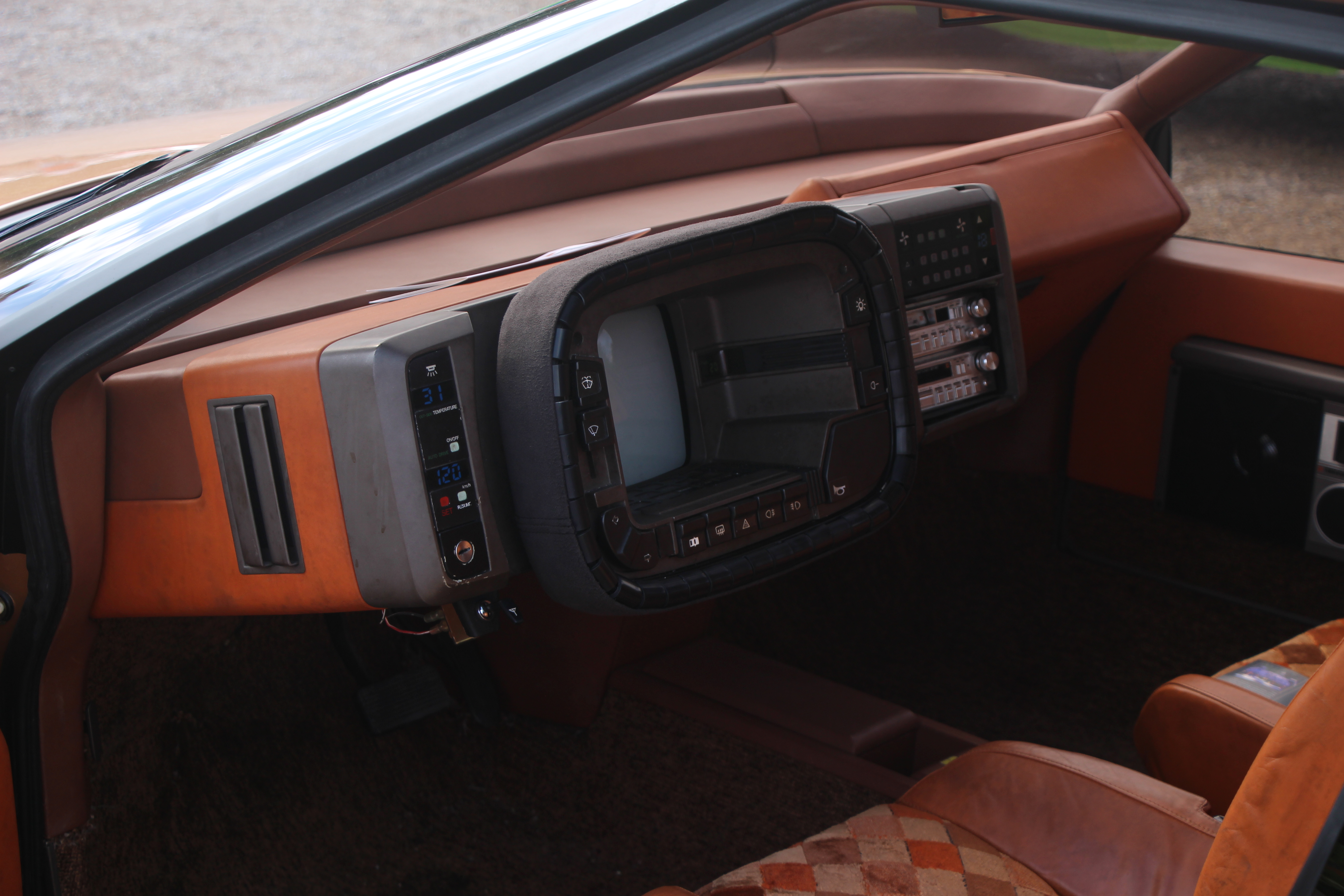
Mazda MX-81 interior
