= Ɛ̃fini MS-8 =

ɛ̃fini MS-8
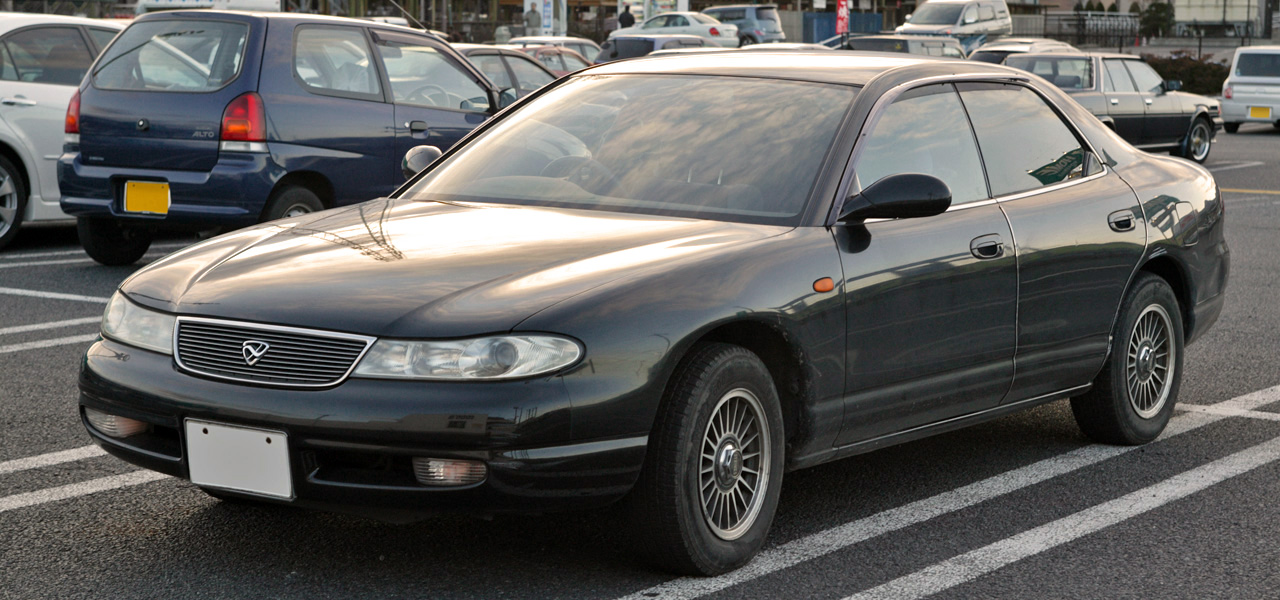

Overview
- Manufacturer: ɛ̃fini (Mazda)
- Production: 1992–1997
- Assembly: Japan: Hiroshima (Hiroshima Assembly)

Body and chassis
- Class: Luxury car
- Body style: 4-door sedan
- Layout: FF layout
- Platform: Mazda GE platform
- Related: Mazda Capella (GE)

Powertrain
- Engine: 2.0 L KF-ZE V6; 2.5 L KL-ZE V6
- Transmission: 4-speed automatic (2 × 2)

Dimensions
- Wheelbase: 2,610 mm (102.8 in)
- Length: 4,695 mm (184.8 in)
- Width: 1,750 mm (68.9 in)
- Height: 1,340 mm (52.8 in)
- Curb weight: 1,340 kg (2,954 lb)

The ɛ̃fini MS-8 is a luxury car that was produced and sold by ɛ̃fini from March 1992 through 1997. The car is a replacement to the Mazda Persona and Eunos 300. Just like the Persona is based on the 1987-1991 Mazda Capella, the MS-8 is based on the 1991-1997 Mazda Cronos (Capella sedan). The MS-8 had the same dimensions as the Cronos, and the ɛ̃fini MS-6, sharing the 2.5 L V6 engine. The width, length, and engine displacement dimensions have particular significance in Japan, due to dimension regulations, where Japanese consumers pay an additional annual tax for larger vehicles, and obligate them to pay more annual road tax.

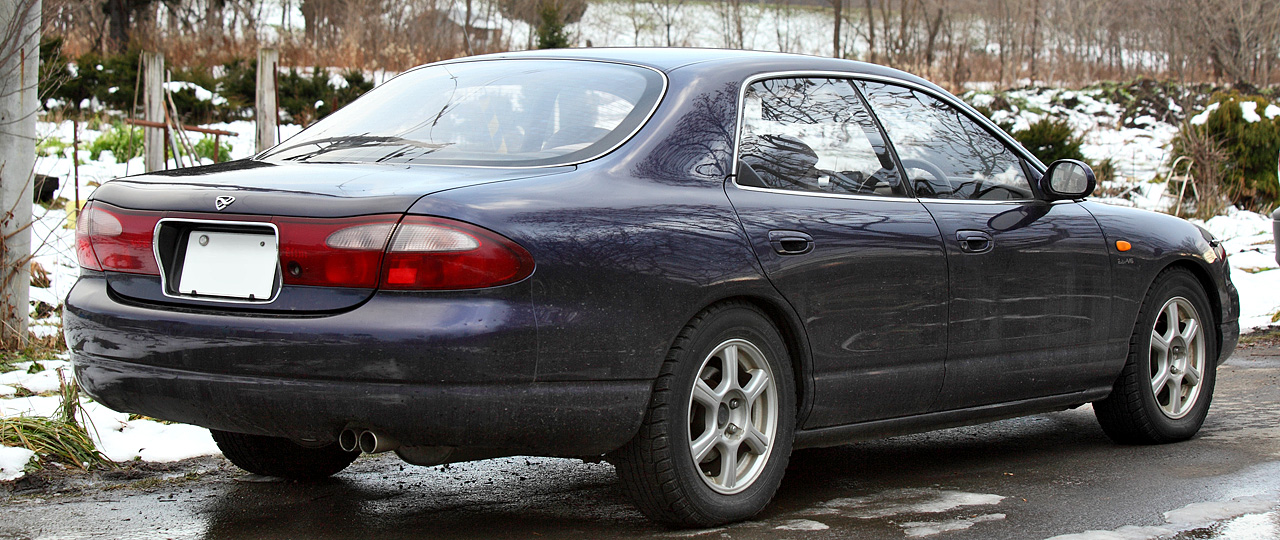
Rear view

The MS-8 is a hardtop-style sedan in the vein of the Toyota Cresta, Nissan Laurel, Honda Vigor, and Mitsubishi Emeraude. Unlike the Cresta or the previous Persona, however, the MS-8's body has a B-pillar that is much thicker below the beltline than it is above. Doing so allows the bodyshell more rigidity while still maintaining an airy cabin. Such a B-pillar means that the front seatbelts must be installed below the beltline. The front passenger seat belt tensioner unit, where the seat belt would recoil for storage when not in use, was located inside the rear passenger doors, and the seat belt latch was located on the front headrest support arm, allowing the belt to be properly positioned when the headrest was adjusted for height for the front passenger.

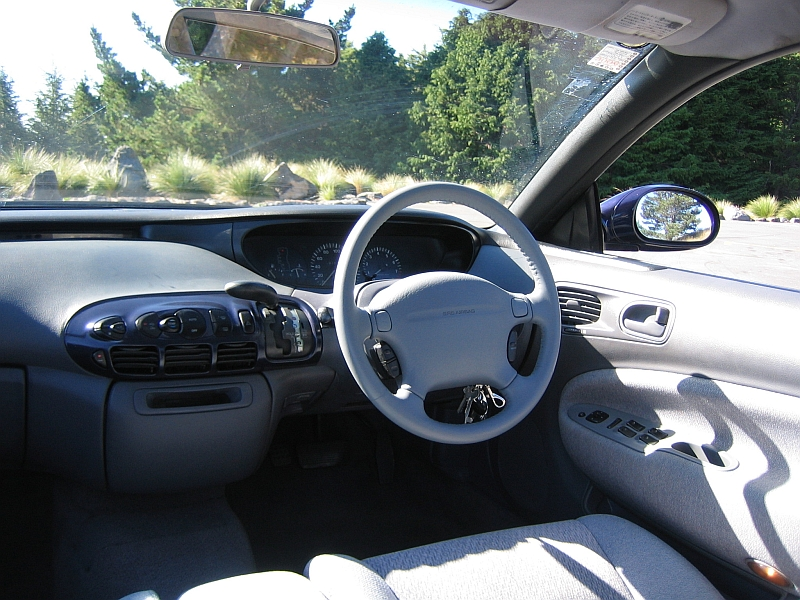
1992 MS-8 interior

The MS-8's interior design has several unique features. The car is only fitted with a 4-speed automatic gearbox, and the gear shifter is mounted on the dashboard next to the air-conditioning controls. Doing so eliminates the floor console between the front seats, and allows for a split front bench seat. The display for climate control and factory-equipped audio is located atop the dashboard, in a thin slit right before the windshield defroster. The sunroof is very large for its day, extending all the way above the rear seat footwell.

Following the 1991 ɛ̃fini RX-7, the MS-8 was also available with the Bose Acoustic Wave Guide audio system, a compact subwoofer design. The stereo and CD player were concealed behind a retractable cover in the center of the dashboard below the air conditioning controls, however, simple functions like the volume, music source (radio or CD player) and music selection controls were installed remotely on the steering wheel.

Four-wheel steering was offered as an extra-cost option. Like the system on the Mazda Sentia, it is designed to minimize turn radius at town speeds, and improve stability at highway speed.

Production for the MS-8 ceased when Mazda's multi-brand strategy failed in Japan, and the company suffered financial difficulties.
