= Mazda J engine =

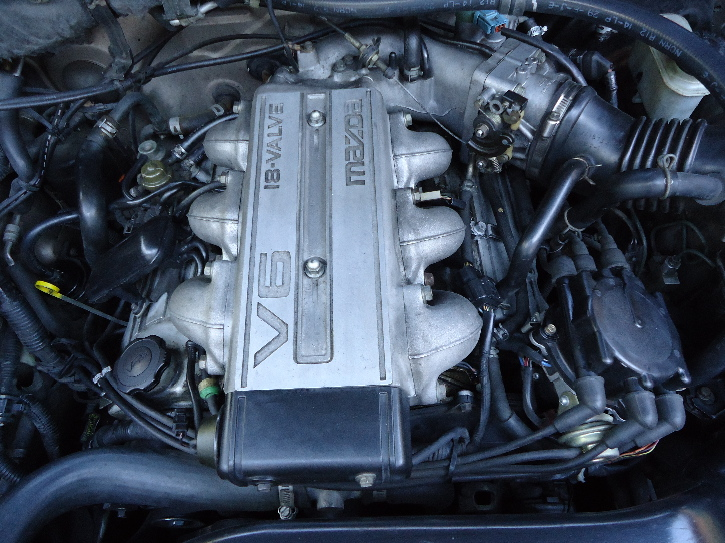
- Mazda 18 Valve V6 3.0 L Engine

Overview
- Manufacturer: Mazda

Layout
- Configuration: 60° V6
- Displacement: 2.0 L (1,997 cc); 3.0 L (2,954 cc); 3.6 L (3,605 cc)
- Cylinder block material: Cast-iron
- Cylinder head material: Aluminum Alloy
- Valvetrain: DOHC or SOHC 18- or 24-valve

Combustion
- Turbocharger: Only in JFT
- Fuel type: Gasoline
- Cooling system: Water cooled

Output
- Power output: 108–227 hp (81–169 kW; 109–230 PS)
- Torque output: 165–232 lb⋅ft (224–315 N⋅m)

The Mazda J-family are a range of 60-degree V6 engines featuring a cast-iron cylinder block and alloy heads with belt-driven DOHC or SOHC. It is Mazda's only cast-iron gasoline V6. These engines are found in the Mazda H platform-based Mazda 929, Efini MS-9, and Mazda Luce; as well as the L platform Mazda MPV and S platform Mazda Bongo. It was built at the Miyoshi Plant in Miyoshi, Hiroshima, Japan.

== JF ==
The 2.0 L JF is a SOHC 12-valve longitudinally mounted V6. It has a bore of 74.0 mm and a stroke of 77.4 mm, and produces 110 PS (81 kW; 108 hp) at 5000 rpm.

Applications:

- 1986-1989 Mazda 929
- 1986-1989 Mazda Luce (Japan)

== JF-T ==
The 2.0 L JF-T is a turbocharged variant of the JF engine. It has the same bore and stroke as the naturally aspirated JF, and produces 145 PS (107 kW; 143 hp) at 5000 rpm.

Applications:

- 1986-1991 Mazda Luce

== JE ==
The JE is a 3.0 L (2,954 cc) SOHC 18 valve V6 used in the 1989-1998 Mazda MPV and 1988-1991 Mazda 929. It produces 150 hp (112 kW; 152 PS) at 5500 rpm and 165 lb⋅ft (224 N⋅m) of torque at 4000 rpm. A JE-ZE DOHC variant was in the 1990-1991 Mazda 929 S, as well as the 1992-1995 Mazda 929, producing 190–203 hp (142–151 kW; 193–206 PS) at 6000 rpm. Both variants have a bore of 90.0 mm, and a stroke of 77.4 mm. In the US market, the DOHC engine saw a drop in power in the 1994-1995 Mazda 929 as a result of improved emissions equipment.

Applications:

- 1989-1998 Mazda MPV
- 1986-1989 Mazda 929
- 1987-1989 Mazda Luce (Japan)
- 1990-1995 Mazda 929
- 1991-1993 Efini MS-9
- 1992-1997 Kia Potentia (South Korea)

== J5 ==
The 2.5 L J5-DE is a DOHC motor with a bore of 82.7 mm and a stroke of 77.4 mm. It produces 160 PS (118 kW; 158 hp) at 6000 rpm. When used by Kia in South Korea, the J5 engine claimed 175 PS (129 kW; 173 hp) at 6,000 rpm.

Applications:

- 1990-1994 Mazda 929
- 1991-1993 Efini MS-9
- Mazda Bongo
- 1997-2002 Kia New Potentia (South Korea)
- 1997-2002 Kia Enterprise (South Korea)

== J6 ==
The 3.6 L J6-DE is a DOHC motor with a bore of 96.0 mm and a stroke of 83.0 mm, producing 230 PS (169 kW; 227 hp) at 5,500 rpm. Its sole application was in the Kia Enterprise, and was discontinued after the 2001 model year. It was not available in any models marketed by Mazda. It was the largest displacement engine offered in the Korean market when introduced.

Applications:

- 1997-2001 Kia Enterprise (South Korea)

== See also ==
- Mazda engines
