= Ɛ̃fini =

Luxury vehicle division of Mazda in Japan

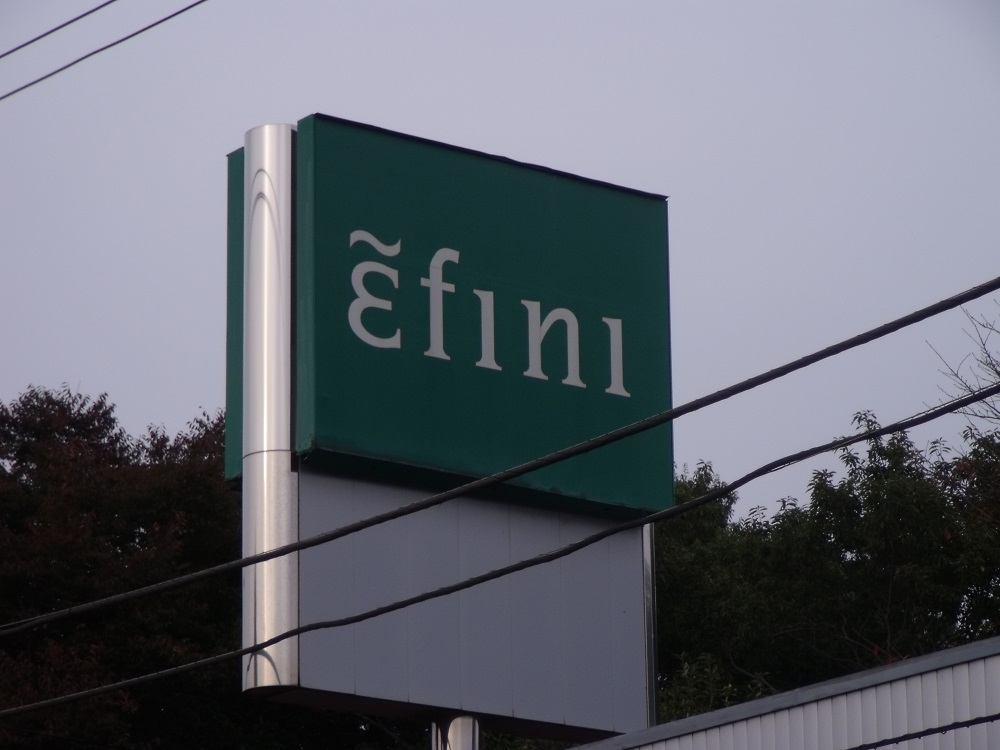
- Type: Division
- Industry: Automotive
- Founded: 1991
- Defunct: 1997
- Fate: Defunct
- Headquarters: Hiroshima, Japan
- Area served: Japan
- Products: Automobiles
- Parent: Mazda

ɛ̃fini (アンフィニ (Anfini)) was a luxury vehicle division of Japanese automaker Mazda that operated between 1991 and 1997 in Japan only. Its inception as a brand emerged in the late 1980s when Mazda diversified its sales channels in the Japanese market with the launch of three new marques. The company created Autozam, Eunos, and ɛ̃fini, in addition to the Mazda and Ford brands already marketed there. This selective marketing experiment ended in the mid-1990s due to economic conditions, largely attributed to the collapse of the Japanese asset price bubble in 1991.

As a brand, ɛ̃fini encompassed most, if not all dealers formerly under the "Mazda Auto Store" dealership network established in 1959 when the Mazda R360 was introduced. Pronounced like the French word infini, the name is written with a tilde over the lowercase Greek ε (as in ɛ̃), and can therefore be assumed to be IPA, the pronunciation symbols taught in Japan, and sometimes used in product naming.

== History ==
The three sedans offered started with the letters "MS", which represented the Greek phrase "Megáles Sképseis" (μεγάλες σκέψεις) which translated into English means "great thoughts" according to the Japanese Wikipedia translated article. The ɛ̃fini marque was a luxury-oriented brand, as opposed to the more mainstream, fun to drive Eunos brand, traditional Mazda, and entry level Autozam. The vehicles sold did not comply with Japanese government exterior and engine displacement regulations which classed all vehicles sold as ɛ̃fini as exclusive luxury products. The length of the MS-6 was the same as the MS-8 at 4,695 mm (184.8 in). Both shared the V6 2.0 L, while the MS-6 offered the convenience of a hatchback bodystyle, and the MS-8 offered space efficiency of bench seats for both front and rear passengers and the open-air feeling of a hardtop sedan bodystyle. The luxury approach was also cultivated as a proposed international marque called Amati Cars, which was canceled due to multiple challenges.

The ɛ̃fini name and logo are not to be confused with several, late 1980s limited-edition versions of the second generation (FC) RX-7s: These were called "Infini", and received infinity ("∞") badging. From 1991 until 1997, when the ɛ̃fini dealership was integrated into Mazda locations, Citroën products were sold to Japanese buyers through this dealership chain, as well as via Mazda's Eunos locations. There are a few Japanese Mazda dealerships that still maintain the sales channels but sell Mazda-branded products.

== Models ==
- ɛ̃fini MS-6 hatchback — 1991–1994 (based on Mazda Cronos sedan; Mazda 626 hatchback for export)
- ɛ̃fini MS-8 sedan — 1992–1997 (only unique model to the brand)
- ɛ̃fini MS-9 sedan — 1991–1993 (rebadged Mazda Sentia)
- ɛ̃fini RX-7 coupe — 1991–1997 (rebadged Mazda RX-7)
- ɛ̃fini MPV minivan — 1991–1997 (rebadged Mazda MPV)
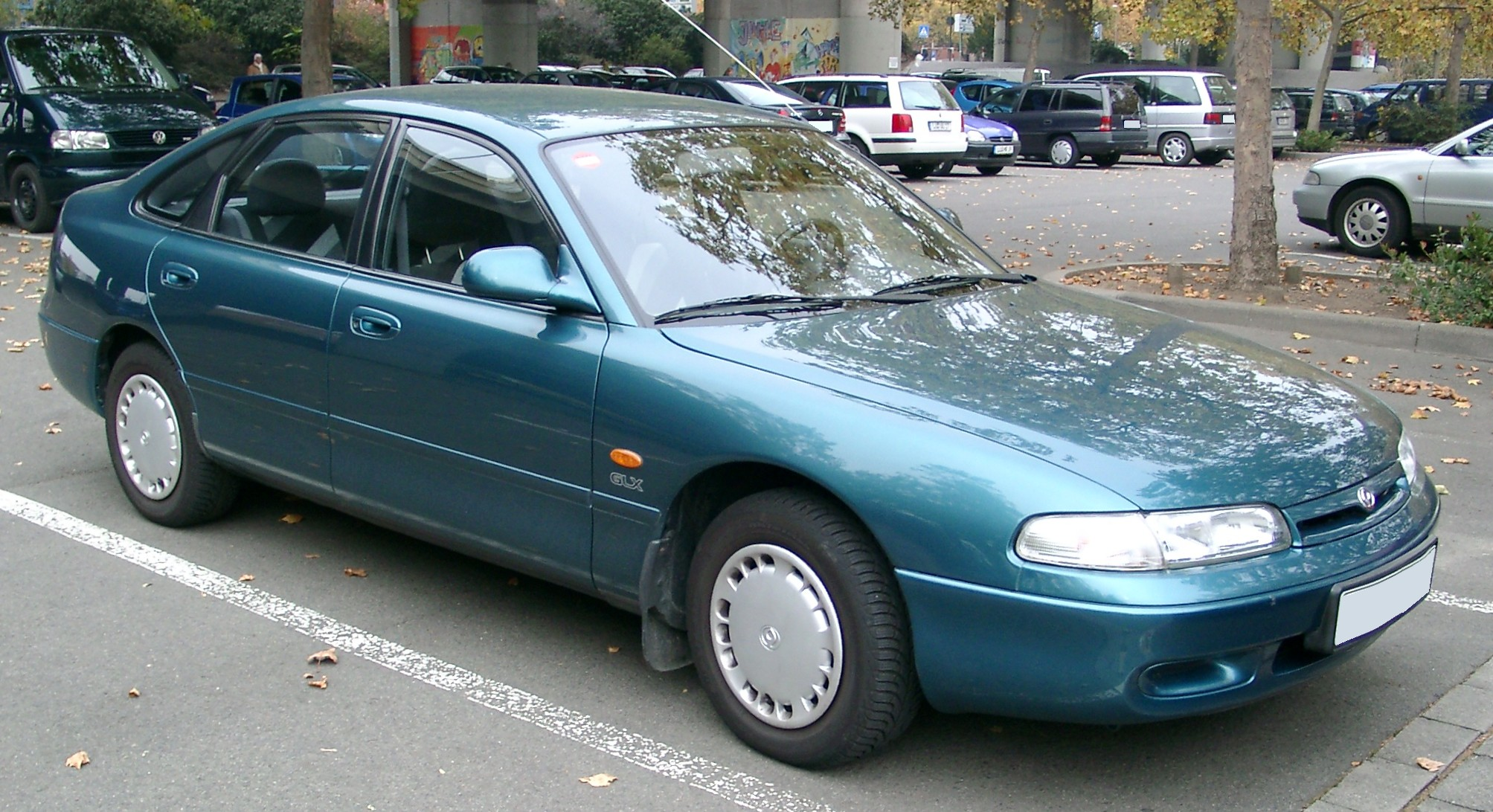
ɛ̃fini MS-6

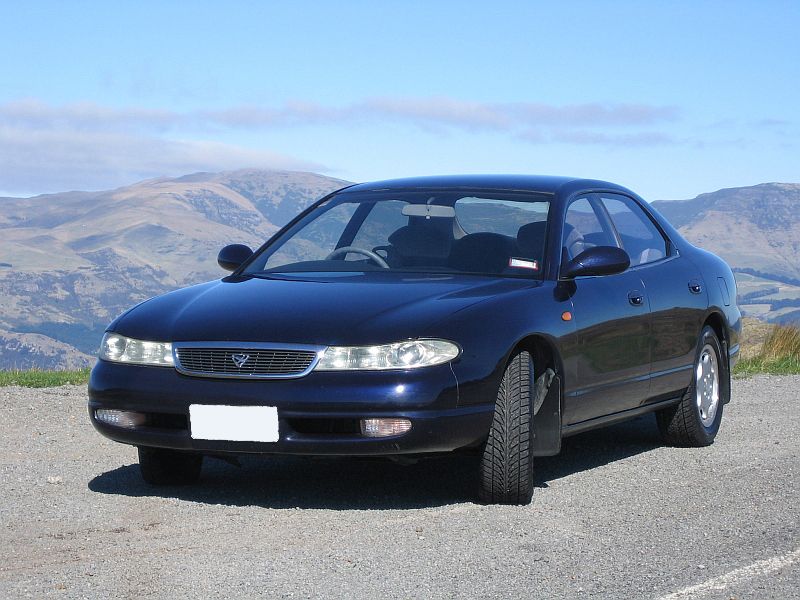
ɛ̃fini MS-8

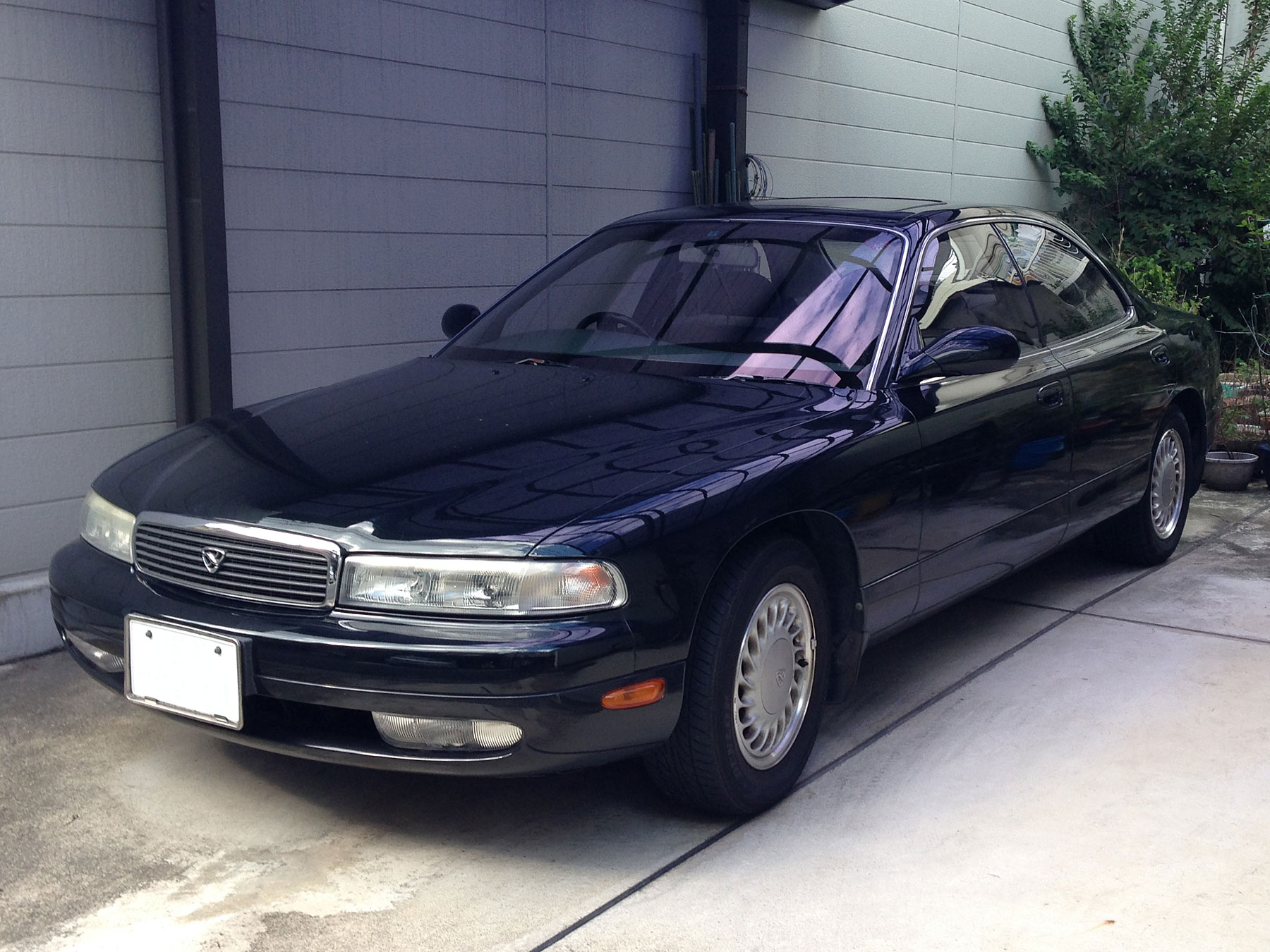
ɛ̃fini MS-9

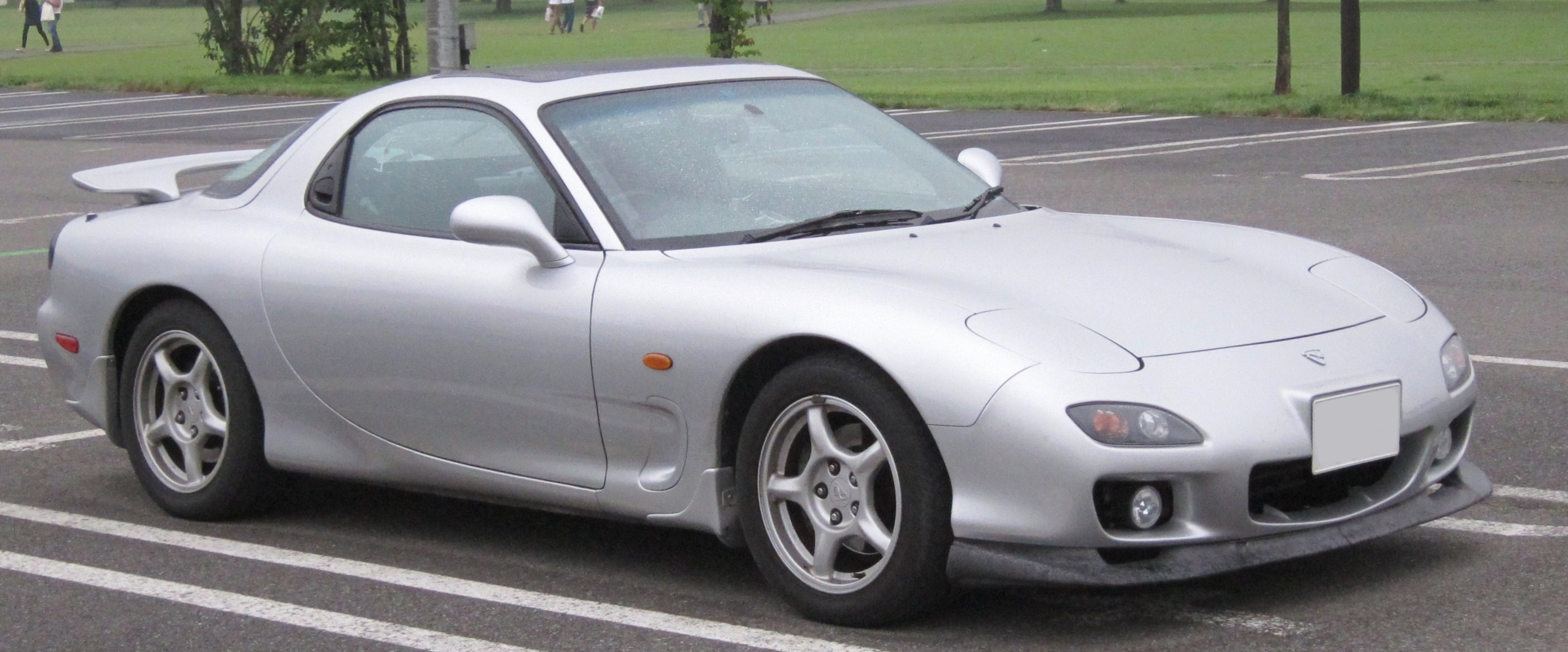
ɛ̃fini RX-7

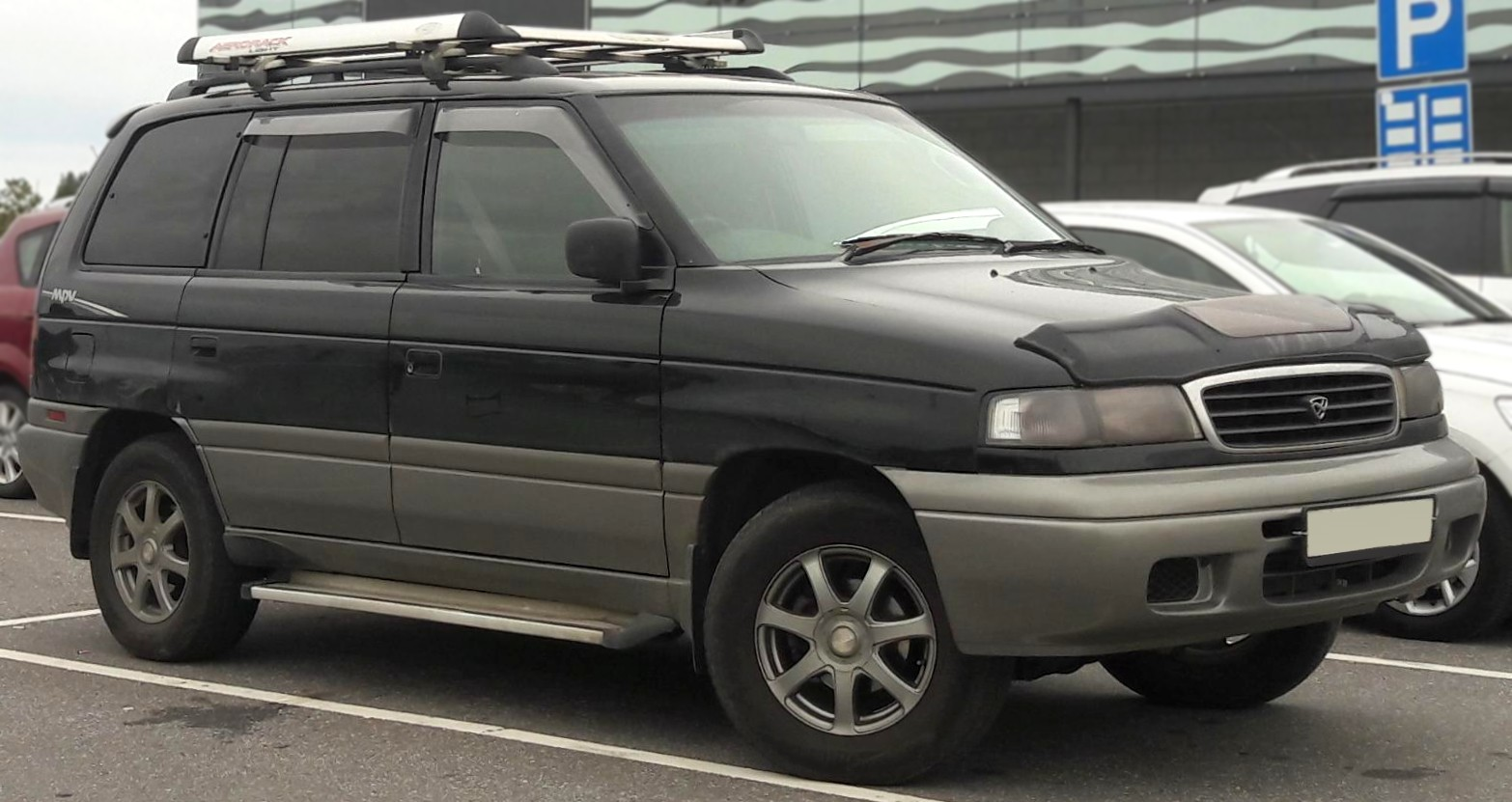
ɛ̃fini MPV
