= Mazda Persona =

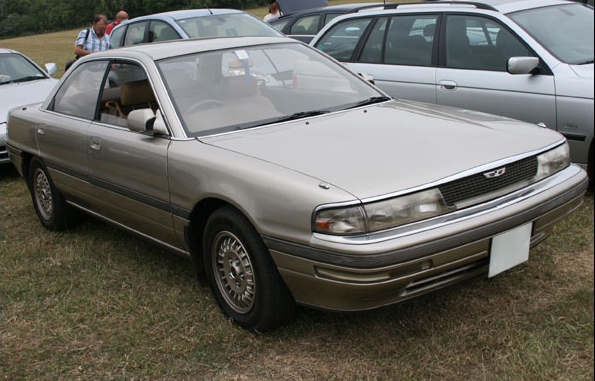

Overview
- Manufacturer: Mazda
- Also called: Eunos 300
- Production: 1988–1992
- Assembly: Japan: Hiroshima (Hiroshima Assembly)

Body and chassis
- Class: Mid-size
- Body style: 4-door hardtop sedan
- Layout: Front-engine, front-wheel-drive
- Platform: Mazda MA platform

Powertrain
- Engine: 1789 cc F8 12v I4 (MA8P); 1789 cc F8-DE 16v DOHC I4 (MA8P facelift); 1998 cc FE 16v DOHC I4 (MAEP); 1998 cc FE-ZE 16v DOHC I4 (MAEP, Eunos)
- Transmission: 5-speed manual; 4-speed automatic

Dimensions
- Wheelbase: 2,575 mm (101.4 in)
- Length: 4,550 mm (179.1 in)
- Width: 1,695 mm (66.7 in)
- Height: 1,335 mm (52.6 in)
- Curb weight: 1,220–1,280 kg (2,689.6–2,821.9 lb)

Chronology
- Successor: ɛ̃fini MS-8 (Persona); Eunos 500 (Eunos 300)

The Mazda Persona is a mid-sized, front-wheel drive, four-door hardtop sedan produced by Mazda in Japan from November 1988 to December 1991, and sold both within its main range and under its upscale Eunos brand, as the Eunos 300. It is a rebodied Capella/626 with more luxurious equipment. The Persona was Mazda's answer to the Toyota Carina ED, Nissan Presea, and Mitsubishi Emeraude — Japanese sedans that attempted to capture the pillarless hardtop look and proportion of large American sedans. Transposed onto a smaller Japanese sedan, this proportion often led to a small, low cabin in context of longer front and rear ends. It was replaced by the ɛ̃fini MS-8 in March 1992, after Persona stocks had run out. The car was only offered new in the domestic Japanese market.

The 1.8-liter engine option had a single camshaft and three valves per cylinder, producing 97 PS (71 kW), while the two-litre option had twin camshafts and four valves per cylinder, with a max output of 140 PS (103 kW). Both engines could also be found in the Capella/626 range and other MA platform cars, although the two-litre was tuned for more torque in this application, and both were fuel injected.

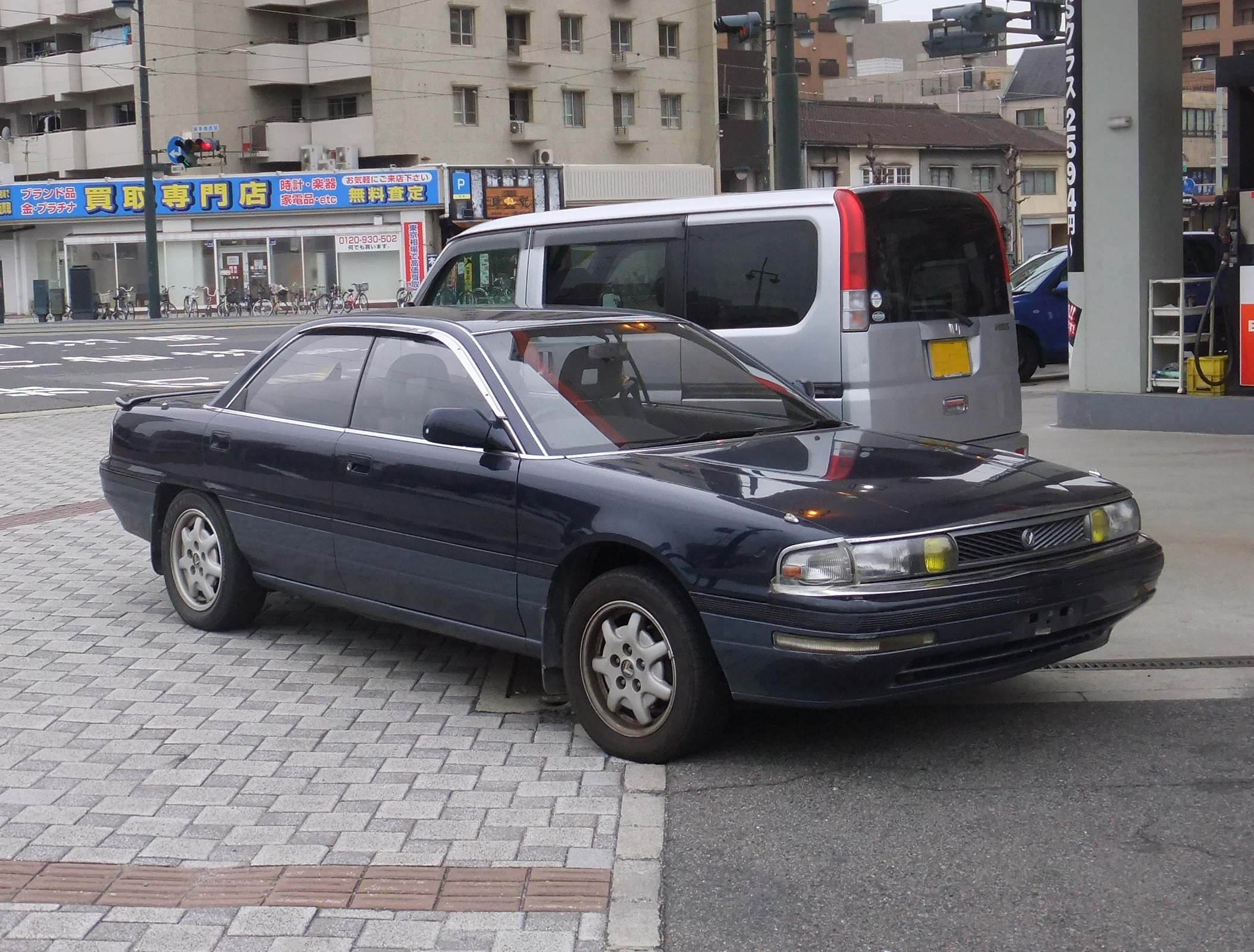
Eunos 300

In February 1990 a limited edition "Persona Couture" arrived, only available in Silver Stone Metallic paint. It was fully equipped, with air condition and ABS brakes over the Type B, and only available with the larger engine in combination with the automatic transmission. It sold for ten percent more than a 2000 Type B. The Persona underwent a minor change in March 1990, with new body colors and more equipment, such as a power seat and optional ABS brakes. The 12-valve 1.8 was replaced by a twin-cam 16-valve unit which had already been seen in the Eunos 300, producing 115 PS (85 kW). Unlike the case of the Eunos, however, the 2-liter FE DOHC engine remained unchanged. Production came to a halt in December 1991, although the car remained on sale for another three months.

Mazda placed much emphasis on the Persona's interior, marketing the car under the tagline "Interiorism" (インテリアイズム, Interiaizumu). It featured lounge-style door trims that appears completely integrated into the rear seats when the doors are closed, while the front seat belts were mounted in the rear doors to be as discreet as possible. It won a prize for "Best Car Interior" in 1988. Other unusual details were the absence of ashtrays as well as a cigarette lighter - they were available as a cost option. A pull-out drawer located underneath the passenger seat replaced a traditional glove compartment. There were two equipment levels, Type A and Type B. Both were well equipped, but the Type B added extras such as leather interior.

== Eunos 300 ==
When Mazda launched the Eunos dealership channel in Japan for 1990, launched on 1 November 1989, the Persona became available with Eunos 300 badging. Unlike the Persona, the ostensibly sportier Eunos version came with an ashtray and a lighter, as well as a different grille with a "V"-pattern rather than the fine mesh of the Persona. It received the more powerful upgraded 1.8-liter engine from the beginning, a few months earlier than the Persona did. The 2-liter option was the more powerful FE-ZE DOHC engine, producing 150 PS (110 kW) with a manual transmission and 145 PS (107 kW) with the automatic. To further its sporting pretensions it also came equipped with a front strut bar and a lower tie bar at the rear. Along with the Eunos Roadster (Mazda MX-5 Miata). the Eunos 100 (Mazda Familia Astina), and the 1990 Eunos Cosmo, these formed the initial Eunos brand lineup. The Eunos 300 was a stop-gap solution until the January 1992 launch of the Eunos 500, also known as the Mazda Xedos 6. It underwent no changes during its two-year production run, aside from the addition of the limited production Type X which received BBS cross-spoke alloy wheels.
