= Mazda Sentia =

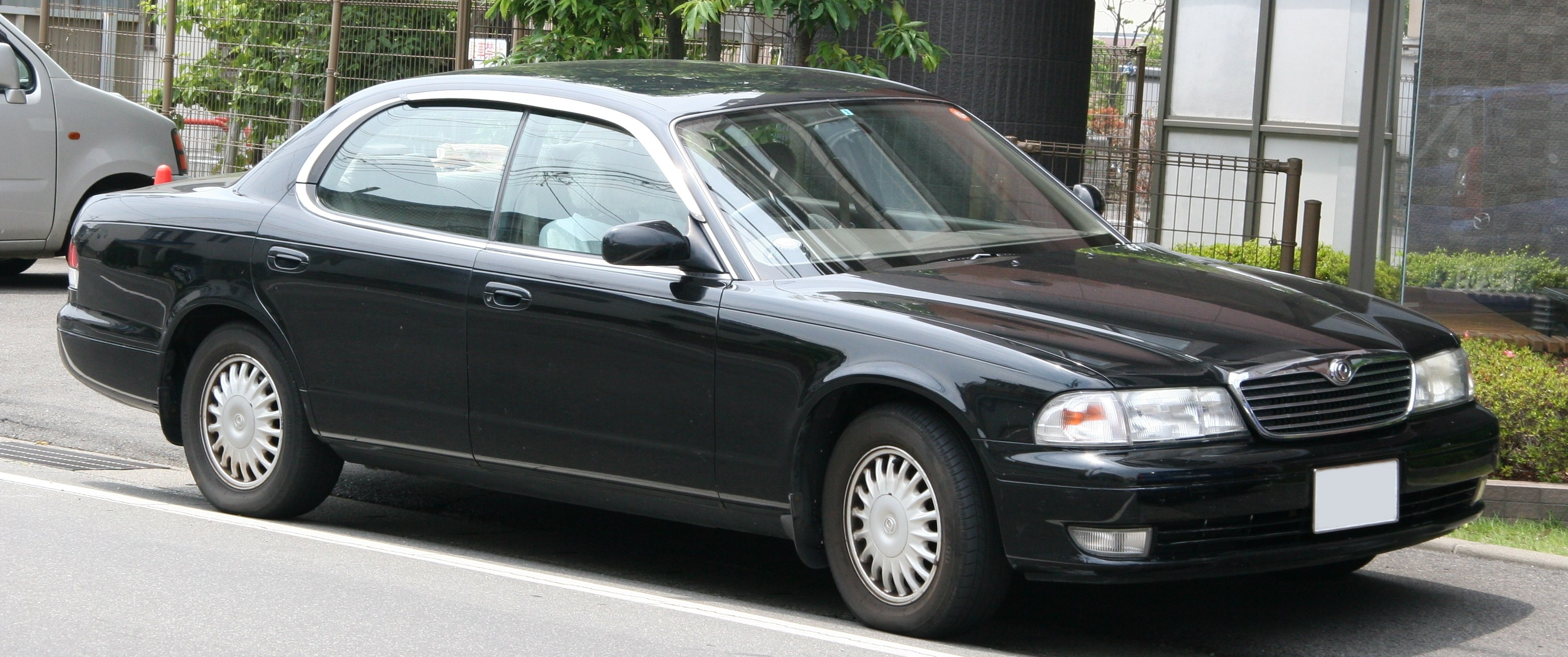

Overview
- Manufacturer: Mazda; Kia
- Also called: Mazda 929; Kia Enterprise
- Production: 1991–1999; 1998–2002 (Kia)
- Assembly: Japan: Hiroshima (Mazda); South Korea: Hwaseong (Kia)

Body and chassis
- Class: Executive car
- Layout: FR layout

Chronology
- Predecessor: Mazda Luce; Kia Potentia
- Successor: Kia Opirus (for Kia Enterprise)

The Mazda Sentia (Japanese: マツダ・センティア, Hepburn: Matsuda Sentia) is a mid-size rear wheel drive luxury car that was sold by Mazda in Japan from 1991 to 1999 over two generations. It replaced the Mazda Luce nameplate on the Mazda H platform, and continued the tradition of being Mazda's largest flagship sedan, which had been in production since the late 1960s.

The Sentia was also built under license in South Korea until October 2002 by Kia, at the Hwaseong Plant (formerly Asan Bay) where it was sold as the Kia Enterprise.

== Etymology ==
The name "Sentia" is derived from the Latin word "sentio", meaning to sense, feel or hear.

== First generation (HD; 1991–1996) ==
First generation (HD)
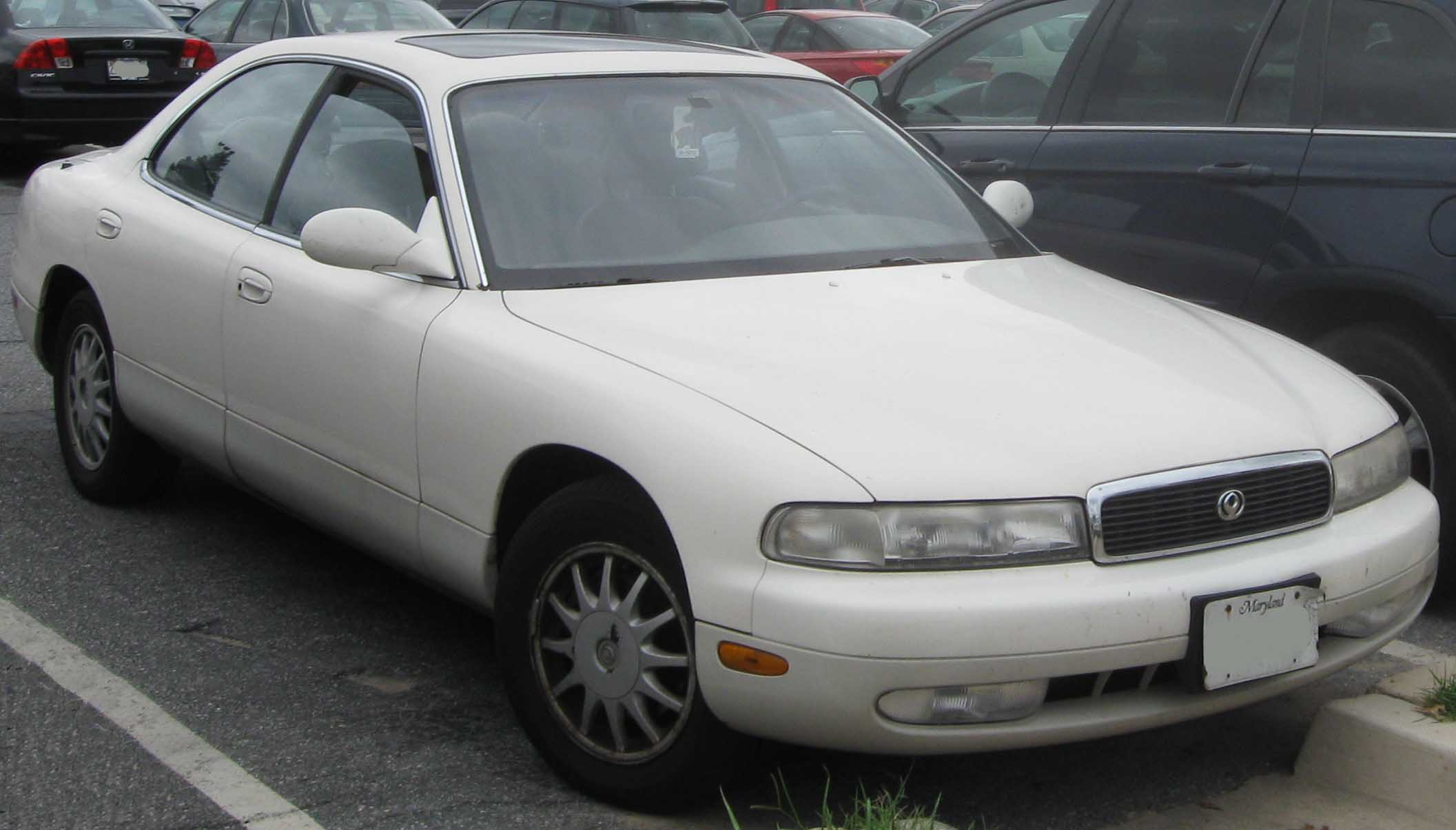

Overview
- Model code: HD
- Also called: ɛ̃fini MS-9; Mazda 929 Serenia; Mazda 929; Mazda 929 Sentia
- Production: March 1991 – January 1996
- Designer: Dori Regev, Shunji Tanaka (1988)

Body and chassis
- Body style: 4-door sedan

Powertrain
- Engine: 2.5 L J5-DE DOHC 24v V6; 3.0 L JE-E 18v V6; 3.0 L JE-ZE DOHC 24v V6
- Transmission: 4-speed automatic

Dimensions
- Wheelbase: 2,850 mm (112.2 in)
- Length: 4,925 mm (193.9 in)
- Width: 1,795 mm (70.7 in)
- Height: 1,380 mm (54.3 in)
- Curb weight: 1,590–1,640 kg (3,505–3,616 lb)

Shortly after the release of the fourth-generation Mazda Luce HC in 1986 (1987 in some markets), development began on a successor. Design work took place under chief designer Shunji Tanaka, who began to consider a more unconventional approach in early 1988. After struggling with development of a theme known as "Prince's Coach" (after the Japanese Crown Prince, later Emperor, Akihito), leading to an unusually large number of rejected full-size models, a young American designer named Peter Montero was tasked with developing a theme with 1/5 scale model. During development of this theme, Montero proposed that, as a non-luxury brand targeting luxury models, a proper rear-wheel drive proportion should be emphasized. After presentation of the theme to and review of the 1/5 scale model with management, a previous full-scale model was modified by pulling the front wheels forward, lengthening its dash-to-axle distance and shortening its front overhang. Another young designer in Mazda's Hiroshima studio, Dori Regev, then developed the final feasibility-proven design, which was approved later that year and frozen on 24 December 1988 for 1991 production, with prototype testing commencing in 1989.

When the Sentia was introduced in Japan, it was also sold at Mazda's short-lived exclusive luxury channel as the ɛ̃fini MS-9 as a higher content luxury sedan, with optional items on the Sentia as standard on the MS-9. The Sentia was the largest Mazda sold during this era, and came with a 3.0-liter V6 engine, setting the Sentia as the top level flagship of Mazda. The width dimension has particular significance in Japan, due to dimension regulations, where Japanese consumers pay an additional annual tax for larger vehicles.

The Sentia was marketed by Mazda as having a "front midship" layout: the V6 engine sits behind the front axle, while the fuel tank rests above the rear axle. The implementation of the engine installation behind the front axle showed technology earlier used by Mazda in its rotary-engine powered products, primarily the Mazda RX-7 and the Mazda Cosmo.

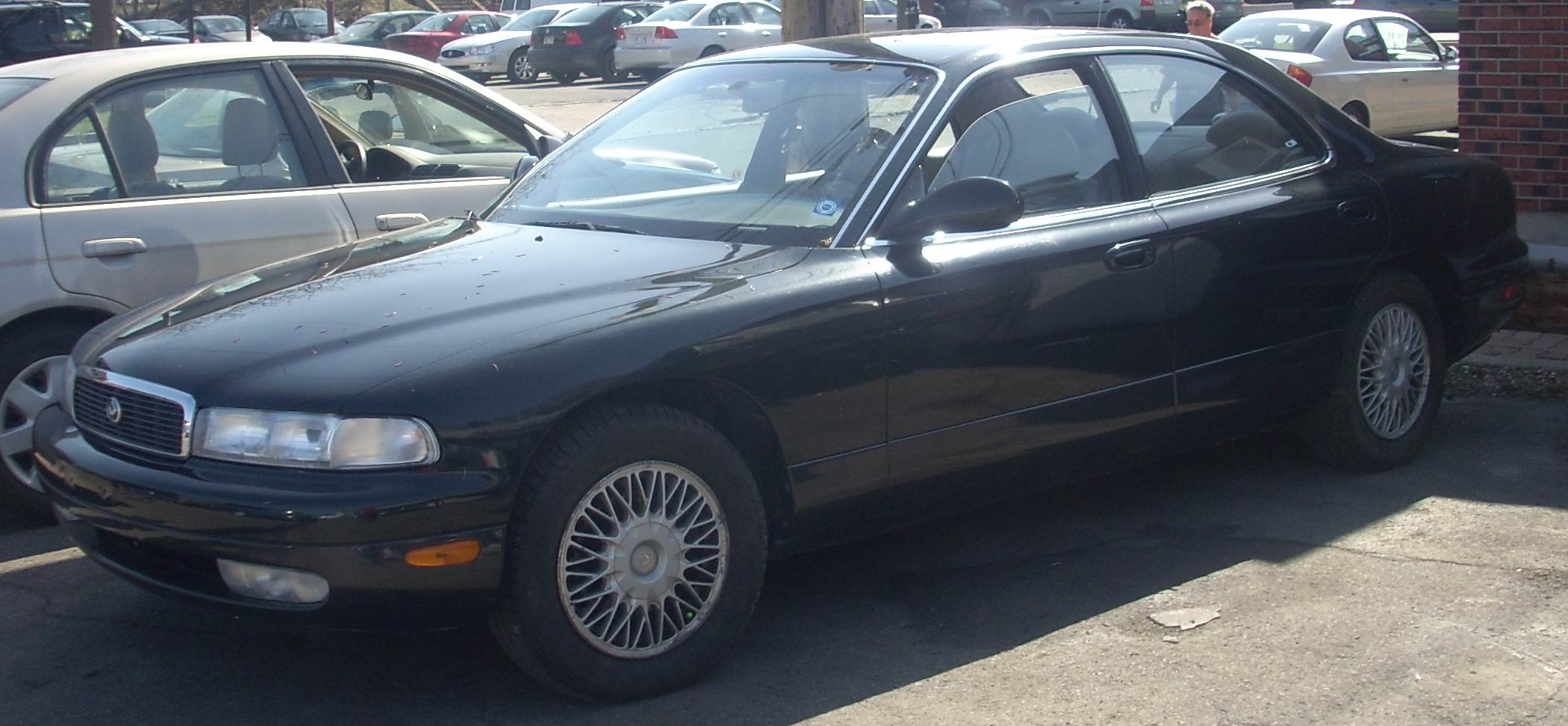
1992 model year Mazda 929 Serenia (Canada)

To showcase Mazda's advanced technology prowess, this iteration of the Sentia also debuted Mazda's speed-sensitive four-wheel steering system. At speeds of lower than 35 km/h (22 mph), the rear wheels steer in an opposite (toe out) direction from the front wheels, in order to reduce the turn radius. At higher speeds they steer in the toe in direction to improve stability.

Solar ventilation system is a setup where amorphous solar cells in the sunroof panel power small ventilation fans located in the trunk area, in order to cool the cabin while the car is parked in the sun. This setup would later be found on the Eunos800/Millenia.

Two engines were available. Both having their roots in prior Mazda V6s, and have no relation to the aluminum KL series found in the Capella-platformed Mazdas. The 3.0-liter JE-ZE received a new variable-length intake manifold to boost its power rating to 200 PS (147 kW; 197 hp). The 2.5-liter J5-DE was also available, rated at 160 PS (118 kW; 158 hp). Two different engine displacements were offered in Japan so as to give buyers a choice between which annual road tax obligation they were willing to pay. The bigger engine was substantially better equipped with luxury features and conveniences for choosing the larger engine.

=== 929 ===
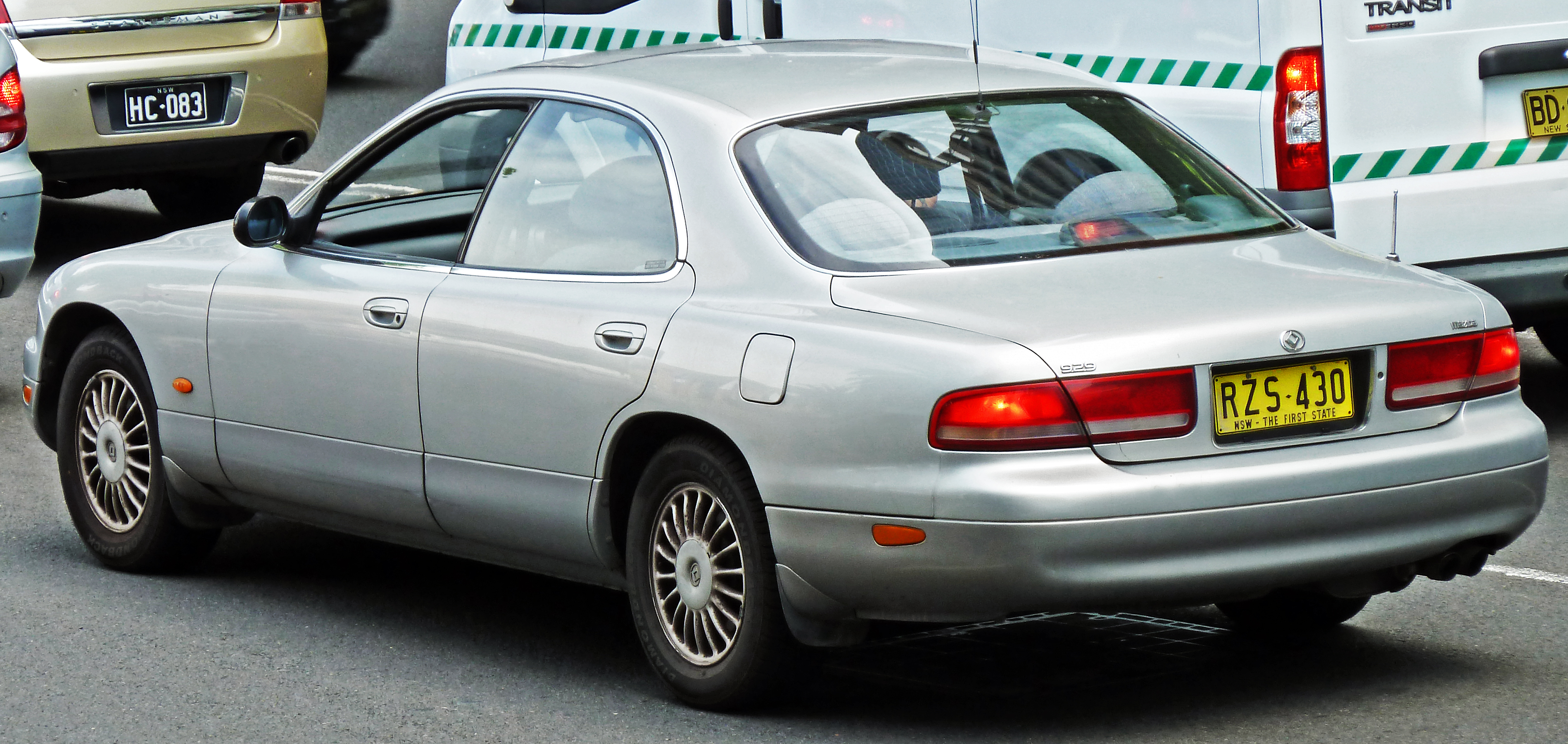
1991–1992 Mazda 929 (Australia)

The HD generation of the 929 appeared in 1991, with the smaller four-cylinder engines dropped in favour of V6 engines only. It was sold as the ɛ̃fini MS-9 under Mazda's ill-fated diversification plan. There was no longer a Luce rotary version, and the Cosmo got a new platform as well. A new model, the Sentia, appeared on the same platform. In Canada, the car was known as the 929 Serenia. This was the only year to carry the Mazda "diamond" badge from 1992, and the updated "diamond" badge (a smoother version) to appear on all 1993 models.

The Mazda 929 was available with ABS, full electrics, cruise, 4WS, 4WD (in some markets), as well as a 'solar vent' that vented the heat from the car.

The Sentia continued for one more generation, but export of the 929 to North America stopped in 1995 with the front-wheel drive Mazda Millenia remaining at the top of the company's lineup. The 929 was withdrawn from North America due to a lack of interest in non-luxury brand Japanese imports of this size, evidenced by the withdrawal of the Toyota Cressida in 1992.

During the early 1990s Mazda had considered introducing its own luxury brand, Amati, to compete with Lexus, Infiniti and Acura but later withdrew their plans. The 929 was replaced by the Mazda Millenia as the flagship sedan, but the Millenia is front-wheel drive. 929 Serenia sales ended in Canada after the 1994 model year, and the United States followed suit with the 1995 model year. It was also sold in South Korea as the badge engineered Kia Enterprise, using Mazda-sourced engines.

Engines:

- 2.5 L (2494 cc) J5-DE V6, DOHC, 160 PS (118 kW; 158 hp)
- 3.0 L (2954 cc) JE-E V6, SOHC, 160 PS (118 kW; 158 hp)/180 lb·ft (245 N·m)
- 3.0 L (2954 cc) JE-ZE V6, DOHC, 205 PS (151 kW; 202 hp)/200 lb·ft (272 N·m)

== Second generation (HE; 1995–1999) ==
Second generation (HE)
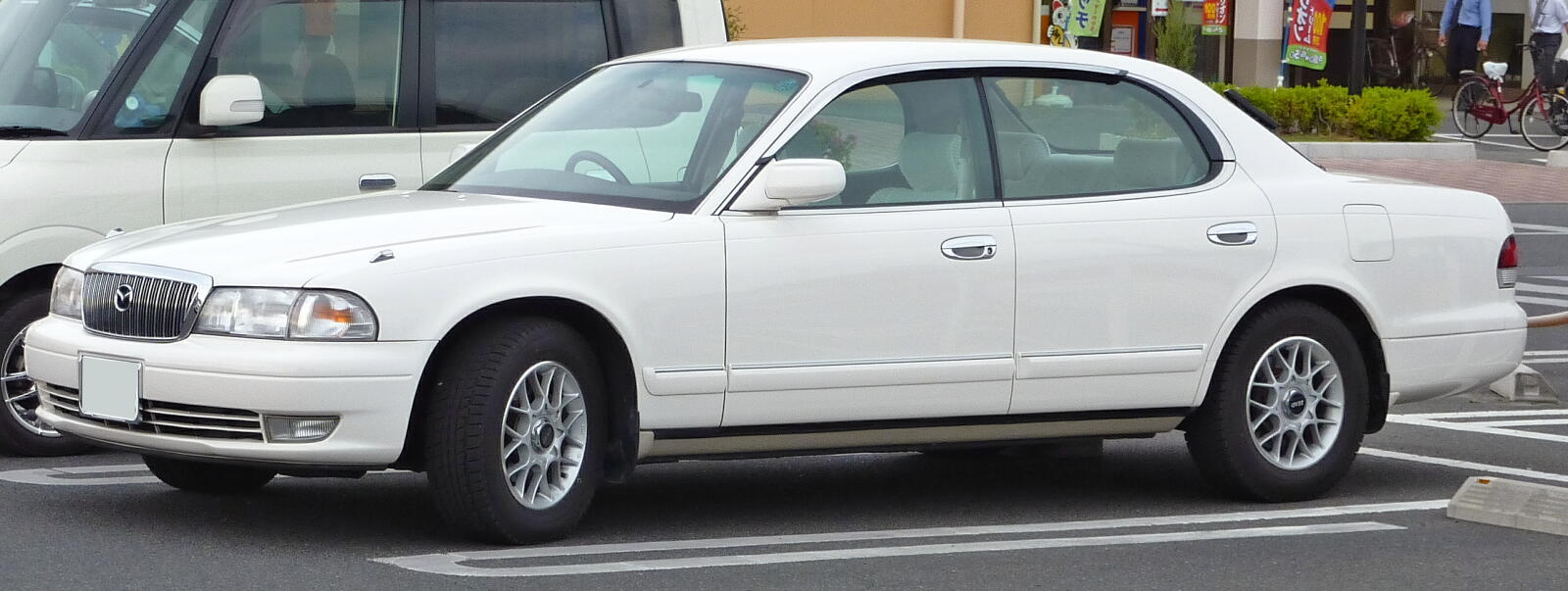

Overview
- Model code: HE
- Also called: Mazda 929; Kia Enterprise
- Production: October 1995 – 1999 (Mazda); 1998–2002 (Kia)

Body and chassis
- Body style: 4-door sedan

Powertrain
- Engine: 3.0 L JE-E 18v V6; 3.0 L JE-ZE DOHC 24v V6
- Transmission: 4-speed automatic

Dimensions
- Wheelbase: 2,850 mm (112.2 in)
- Length: 4,895 mm (192.7 in)
- Width: 1,795 mm (70.7 in)
- Height: 1,420 mm (55.9 in)
- Curb weight: 1,530–1,620 kg (3,373–3,571 lb)

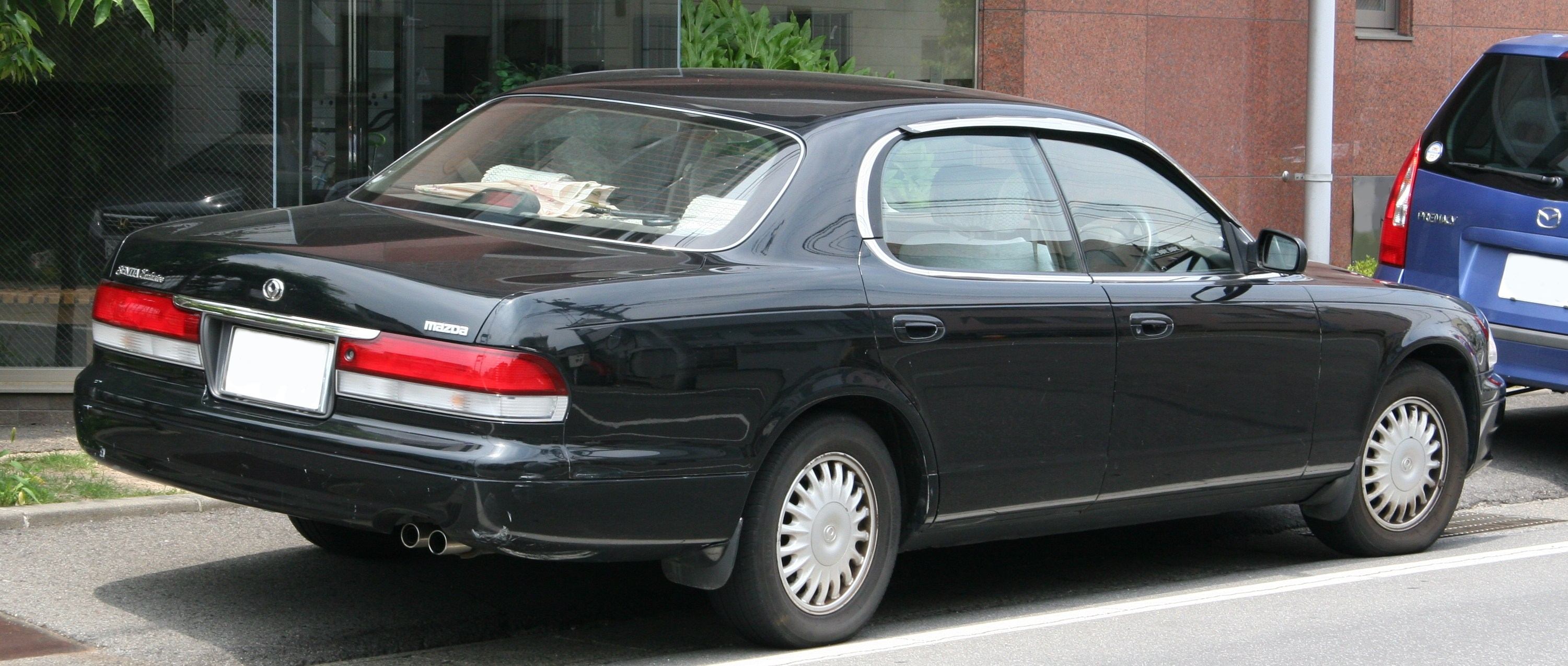
Rear view

The final HE generation of the Sentia appeared in late 1995 in Asia and in Australia in April 1996 as the 929. The engine remained a carry-over, and the dimensions of the vehicle were reduced from the previous model. Production remained short; exports were halted to Australia in 1997 due to poor sales and an increasingly high price tag (in its final year the 929's price had increased to over AUD $79,300 in the Australian market—about the same price as an entry-level BMW 5 Series)

The 1995 Sentia used Mazda's updated HE platform, and was the last large RWD sedan from Mazda. Japanese automotive magazine Best Car Magazine showed that the car incorporates a number of styling cues from the stillborn Amati 1000. This generation Sentia had been developed with the proposed Mazda flagship in mind. Anticipating that it would take over the role of formal-use vehicles (i.e. chauffeur-driven transport for executives) in the product line, this Sentia is considerably geared towards private owners in its focus. The mechanical underpinnings are largely carried over from the previous Sentia. The exterior and interior received a mild redesign to make the car more stately, and suitable for formal corporate use. This includes a larger grille, taller roofline for improved rear headroom, as well as large expanses of woodgrain panelling.

The Japanese TV advertising campaign featured Sean Connery stating "Sentia...striking!".

Engines:

- 3.0 L (2,954 cc) JE-E SOHC 18 valve V6
- 3.0 L (2,954 cc) JE-ZE DOHC 24 valve V6, 138 kW (185 hp)/270 N⋅m (199 lbf⋅ft)

The second-generation Sentia drops the 2.5-liter engine, and uses the 3-liter unit in two different tuning for 200 PS (147 kW; 197 hp) and 160 PS (118 kW; 158 hp) respectively.

=== Kia Enterprise ===
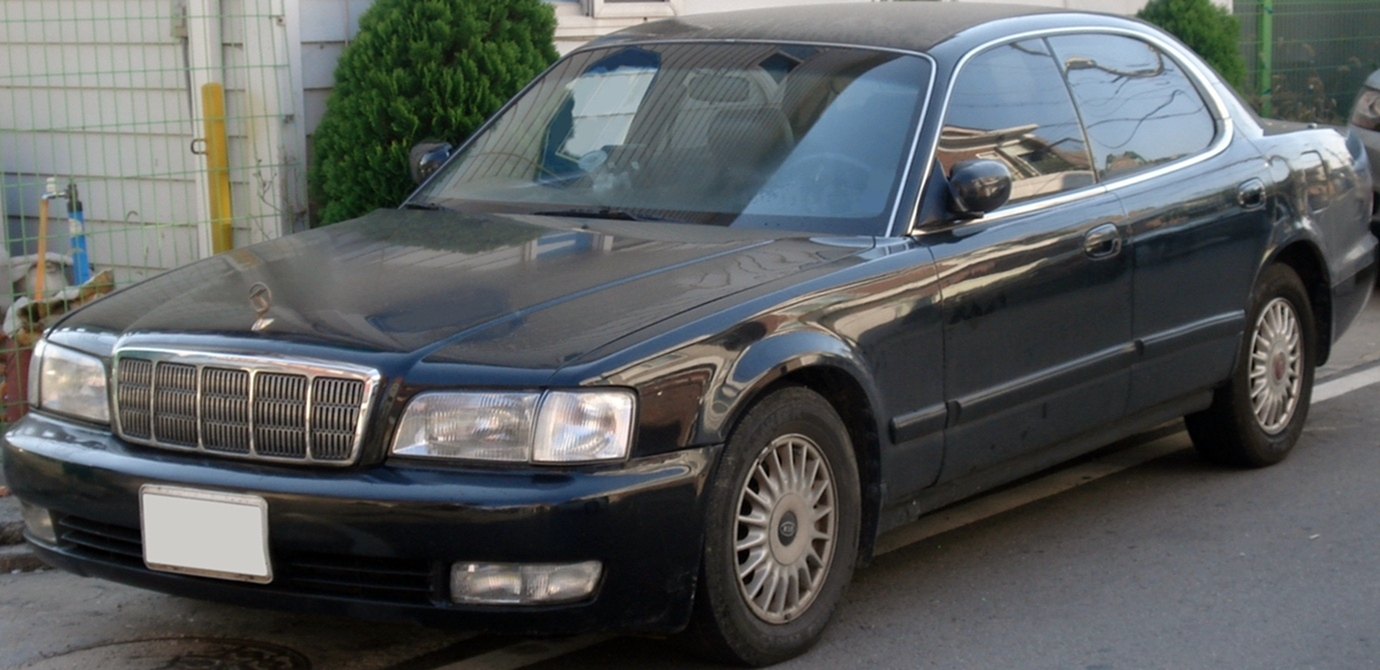
Kia Enterprise

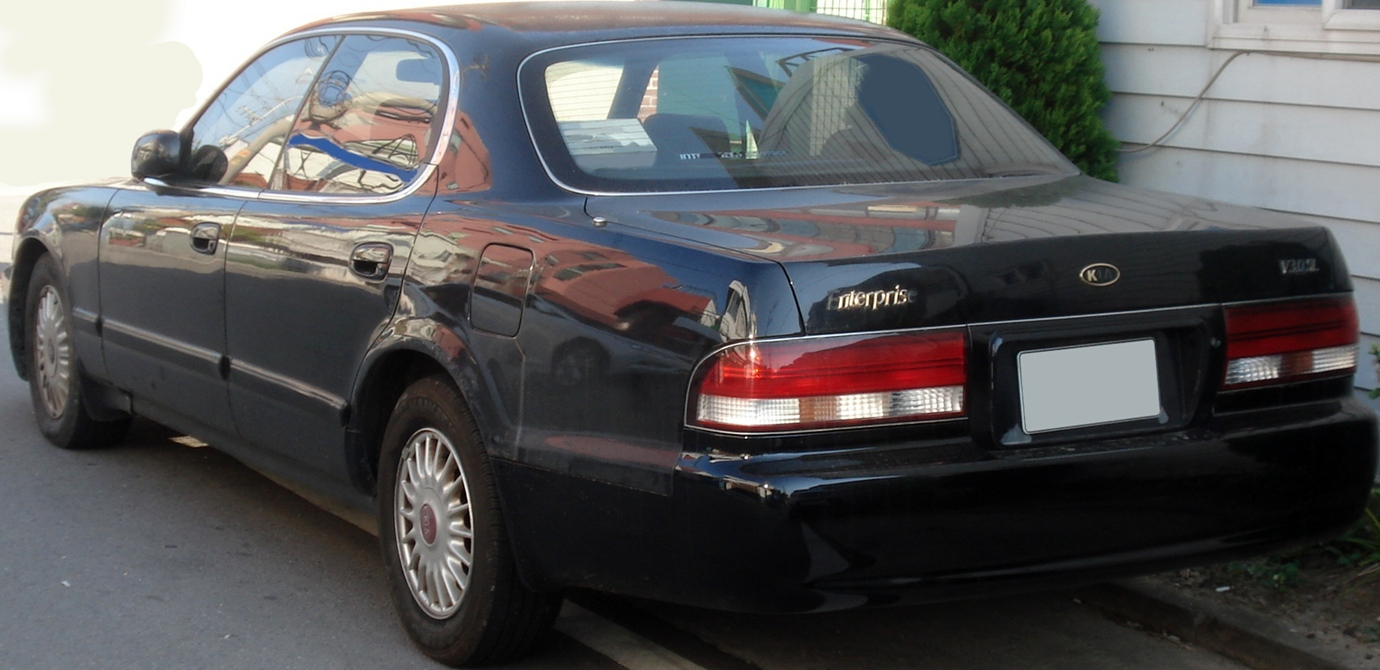
Kia Enterprise rear

The Kia Enterprise was a sedan built by Kia Motors at its Hwaseong Plant and was based on the Mazda Sentia. It was made available for sale in 1998. It was powered by one of three Mazda-sourced petrol engines of 2.5, 3.0, or 3.6 litres. As before, Kia's full-size sedan was based on a Mazda platform and its predecessor was called the Kia Potentia. The Enterprise has a FR layout with multilink front and rear suspension. In 2002, it was replaced by the Kia Opirus, a platform shared with the Hyundai Grandeur. The Enterprise was a left hand drive vehicle, while the Sentia was right hand drive. It was the last rebadged Mazda released by Kia Motors before the company merged with Hyundai Motor Company due to the Asian Financial Crisis in 1997.
