= Mazda 929 =

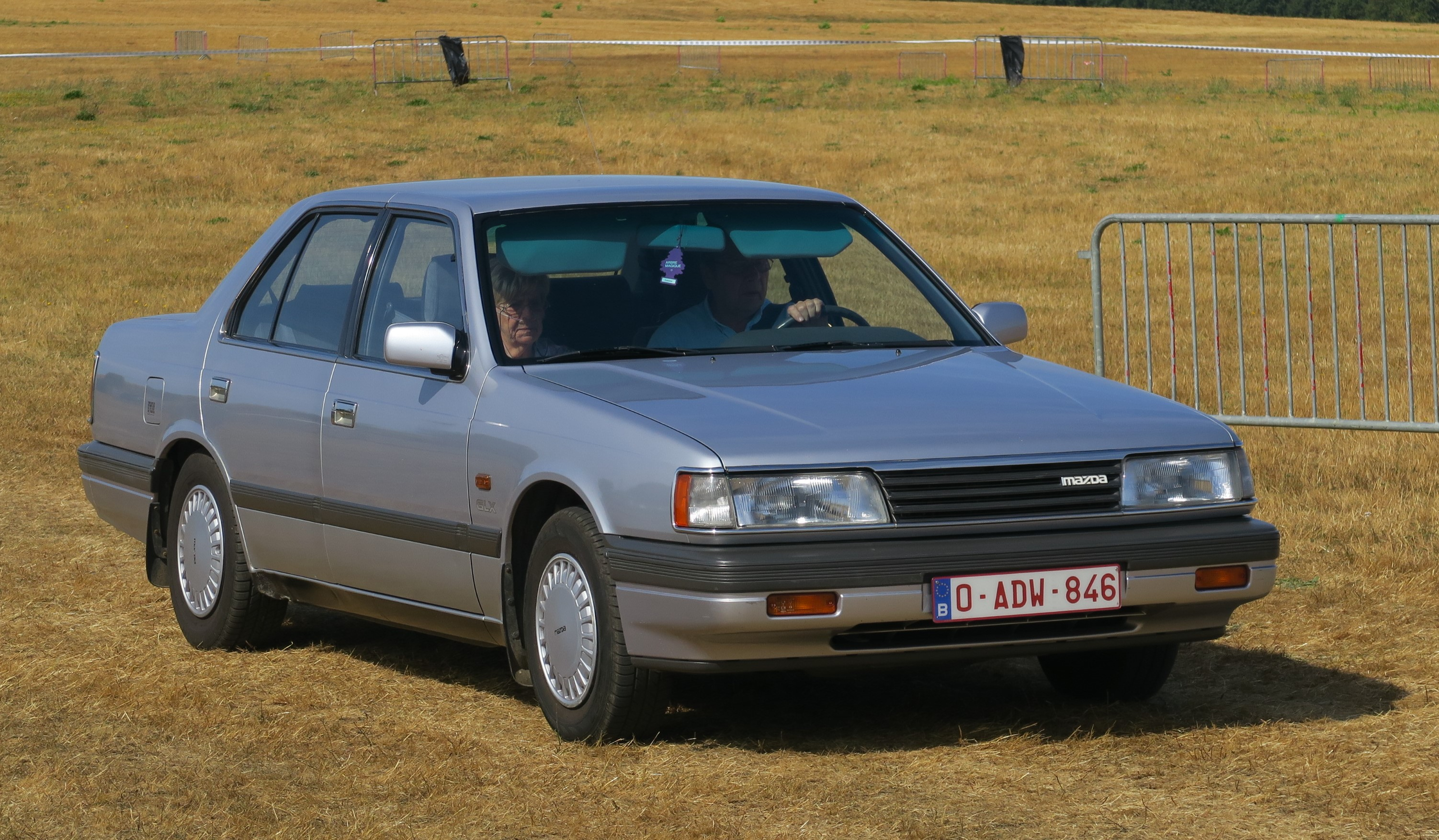
- Mazda 929 (HC)

Overview
- Manufacturer: Mazda
- Production: 1973–1997
- Assembly: Japan

The Mazda 929 is a full-size car which was sold by the Japanese automobile manufacturer Mazda between 1973 and 1997. Mazda used the 929 nameplate for export markets only, badge engineering its Luce model until 1991 and then transferring the name to export specification Sentia models. Between 1982 and 1986, Mazda also used the 929 nameplate on its Cosmo coupé in certain export markets.

== LA2 Series I (1973–1976) ==
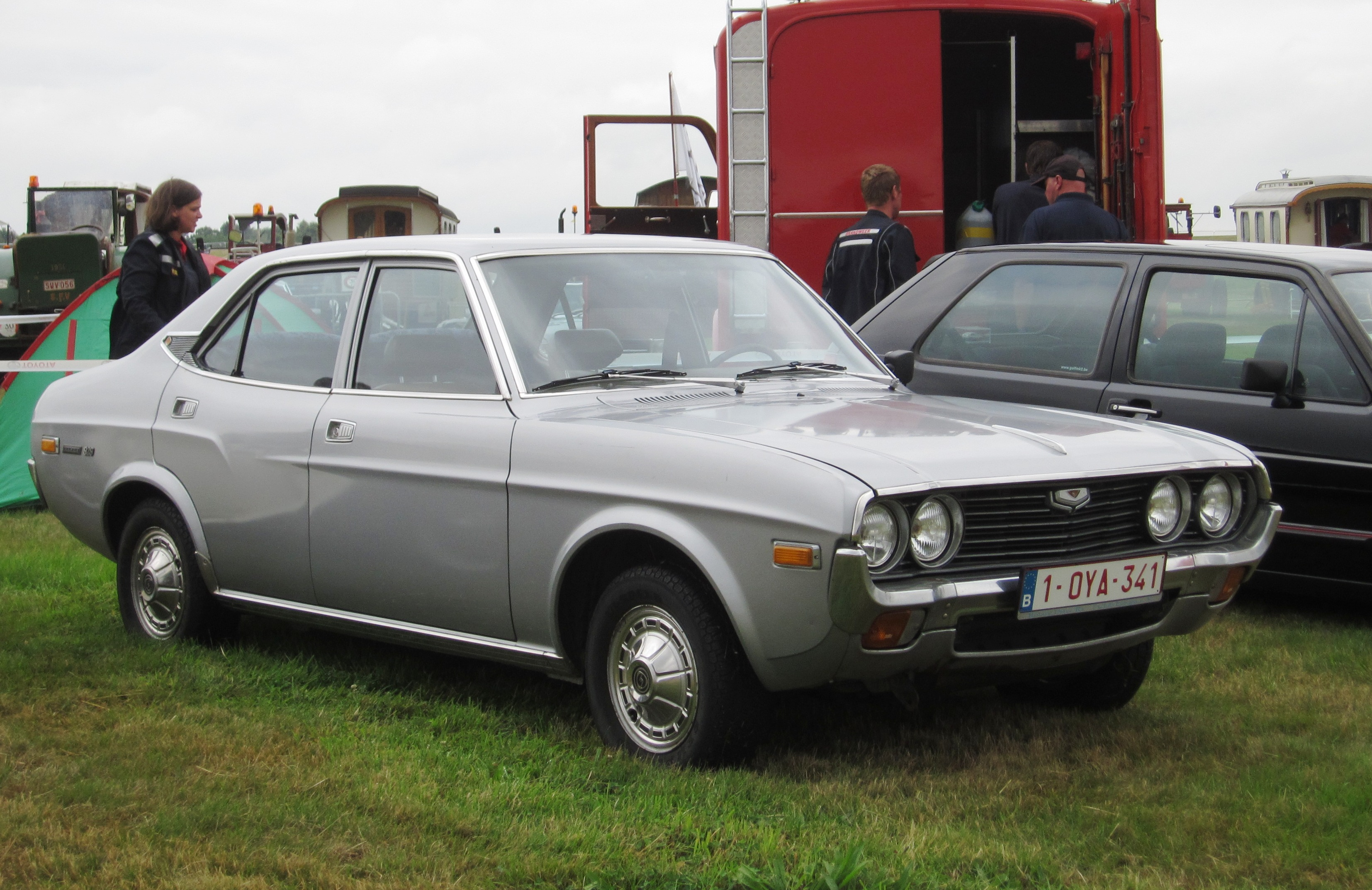
Mazda Luce sedan

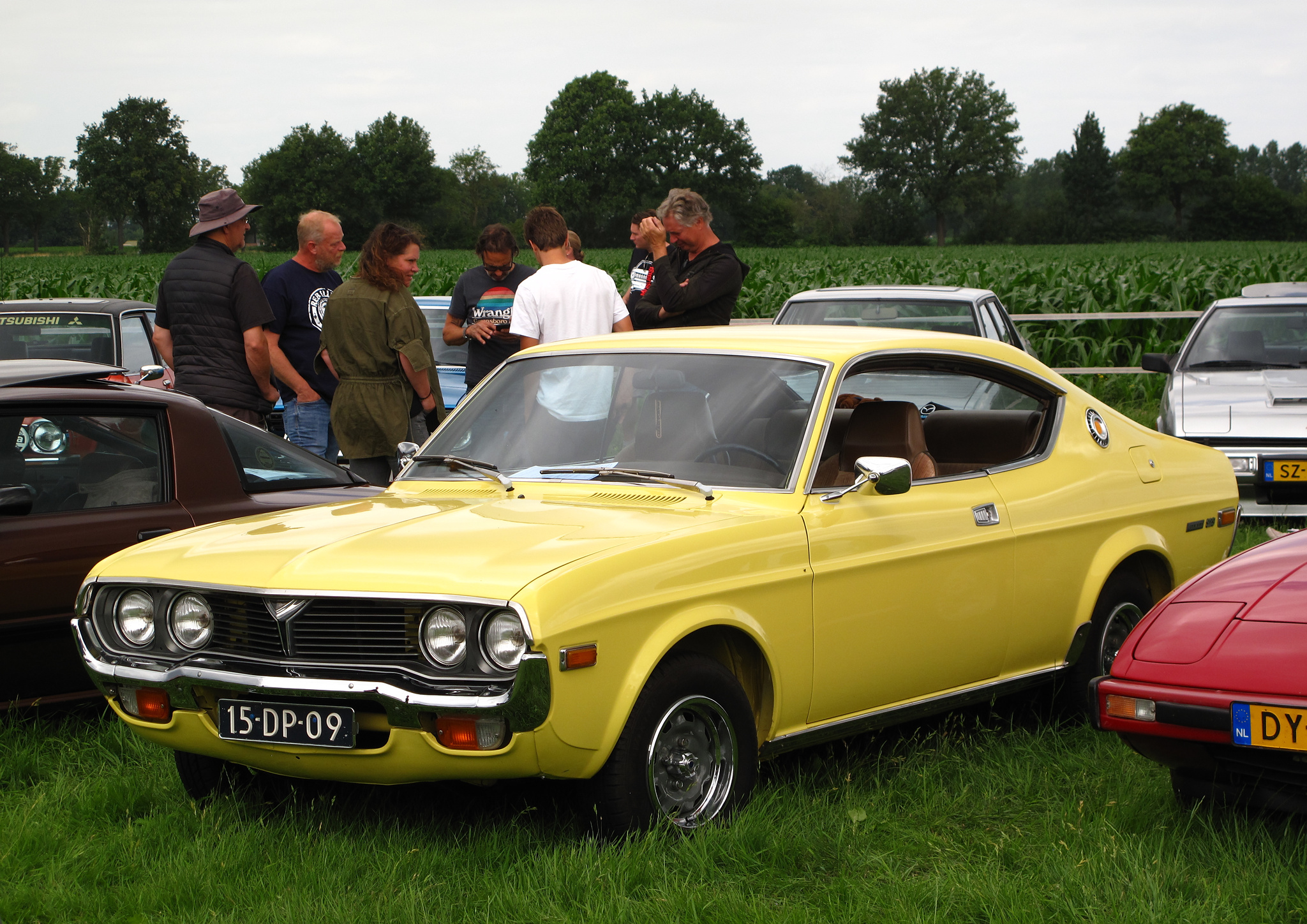
Mazda Luce coupe

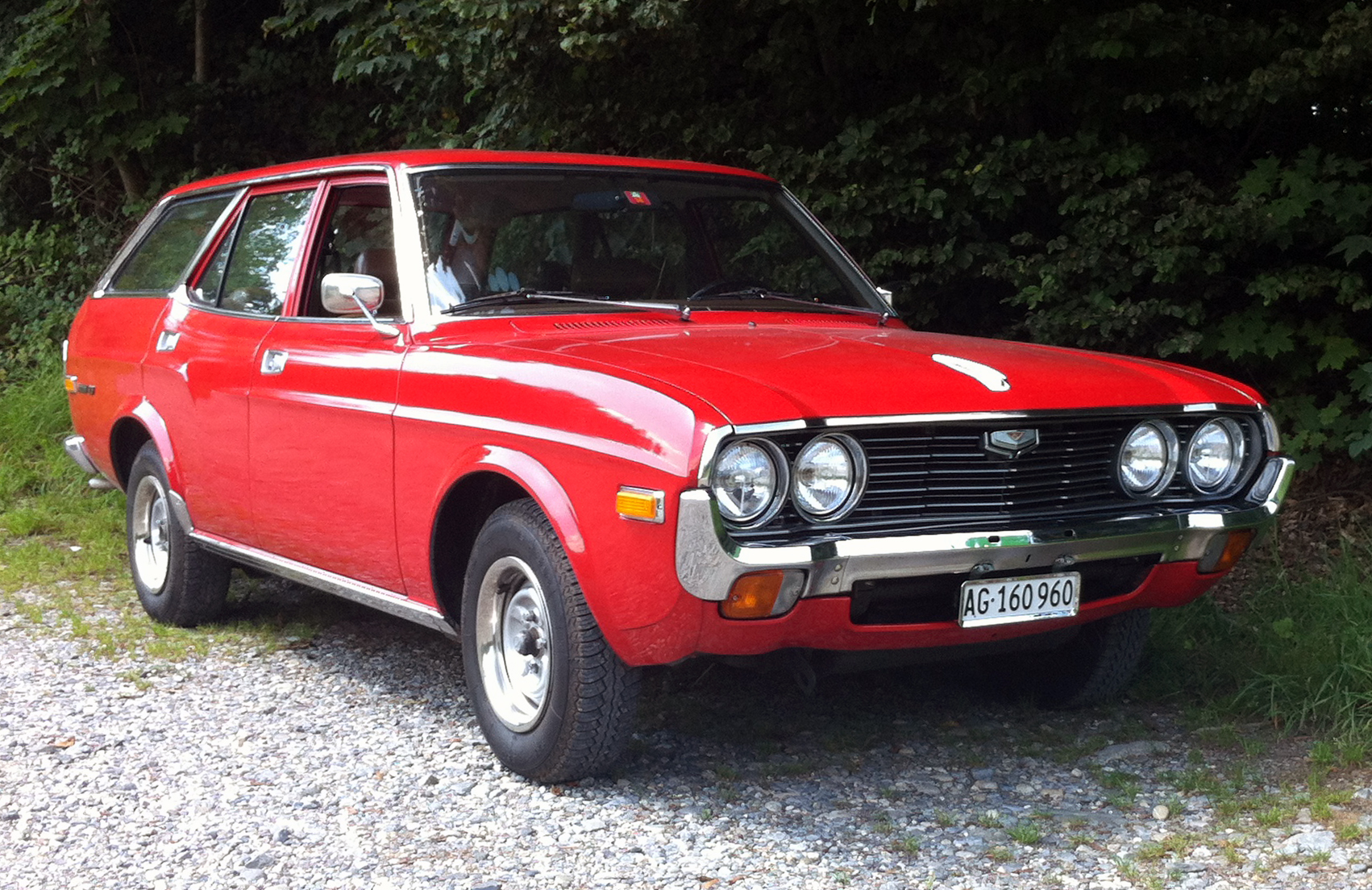
Mazda Luce station wagon (Combi)

== LA2 Series II (1976–1978) ==
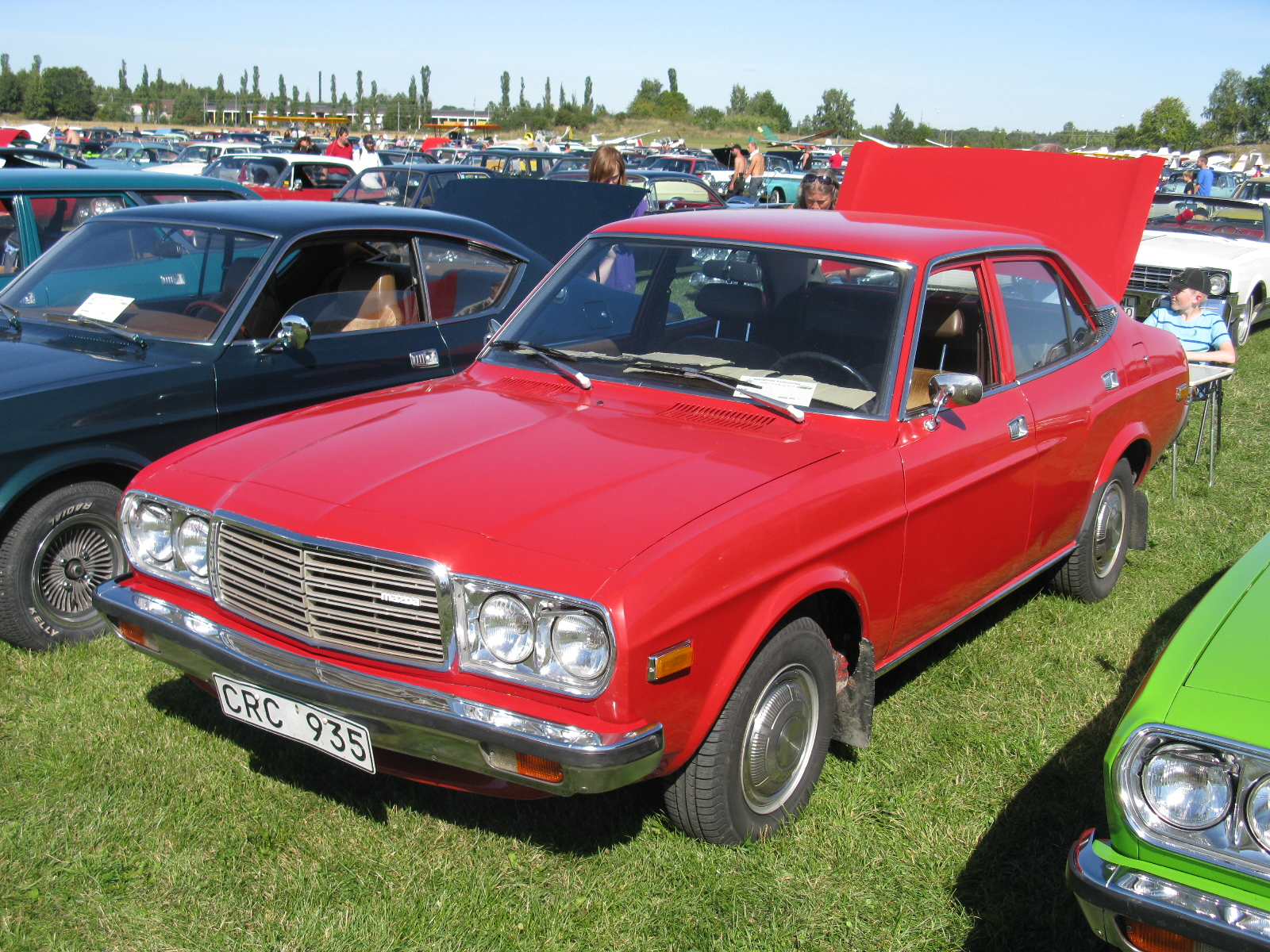
Mazda Luce sedan

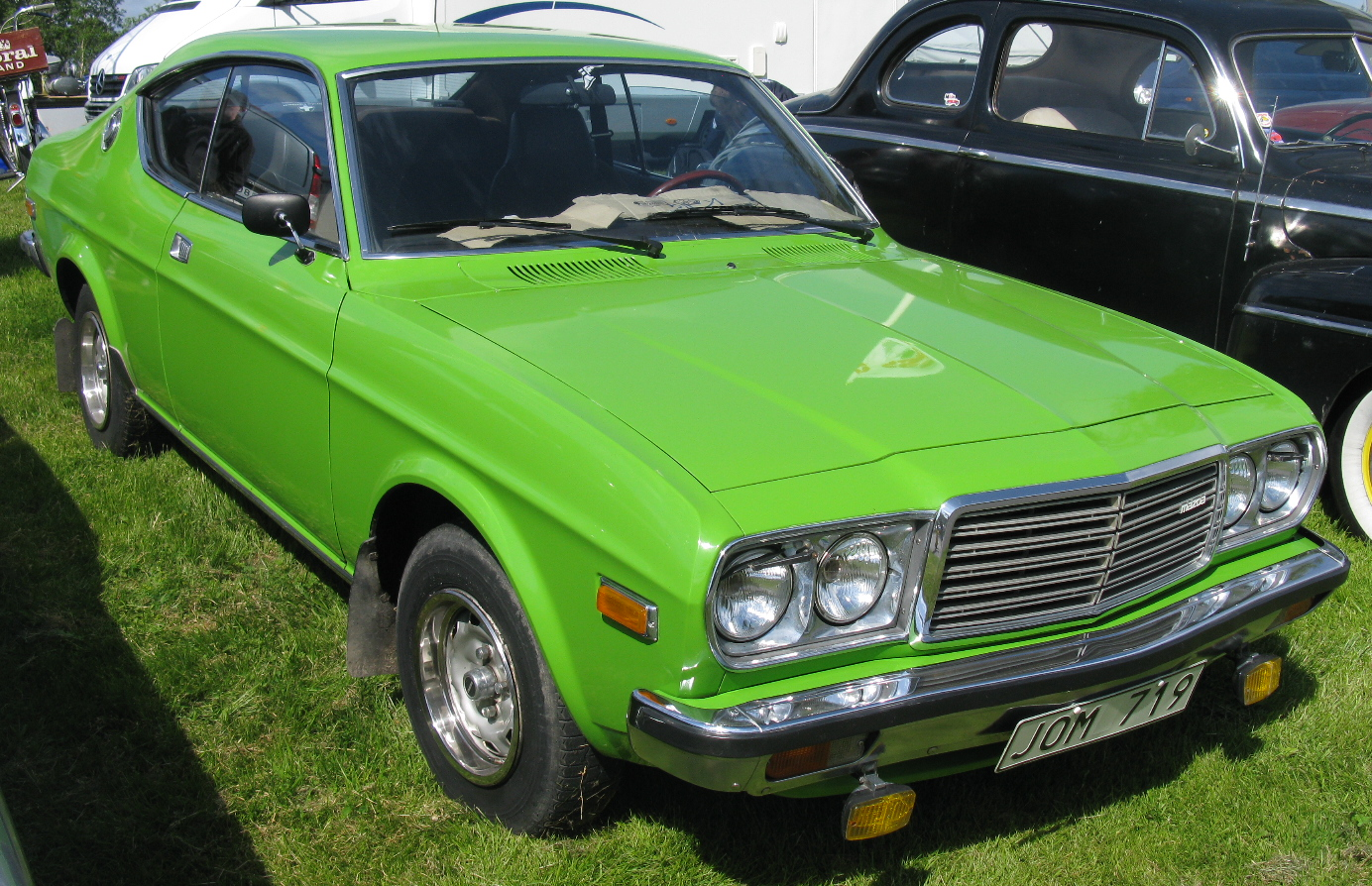
Mazda Luce coupe

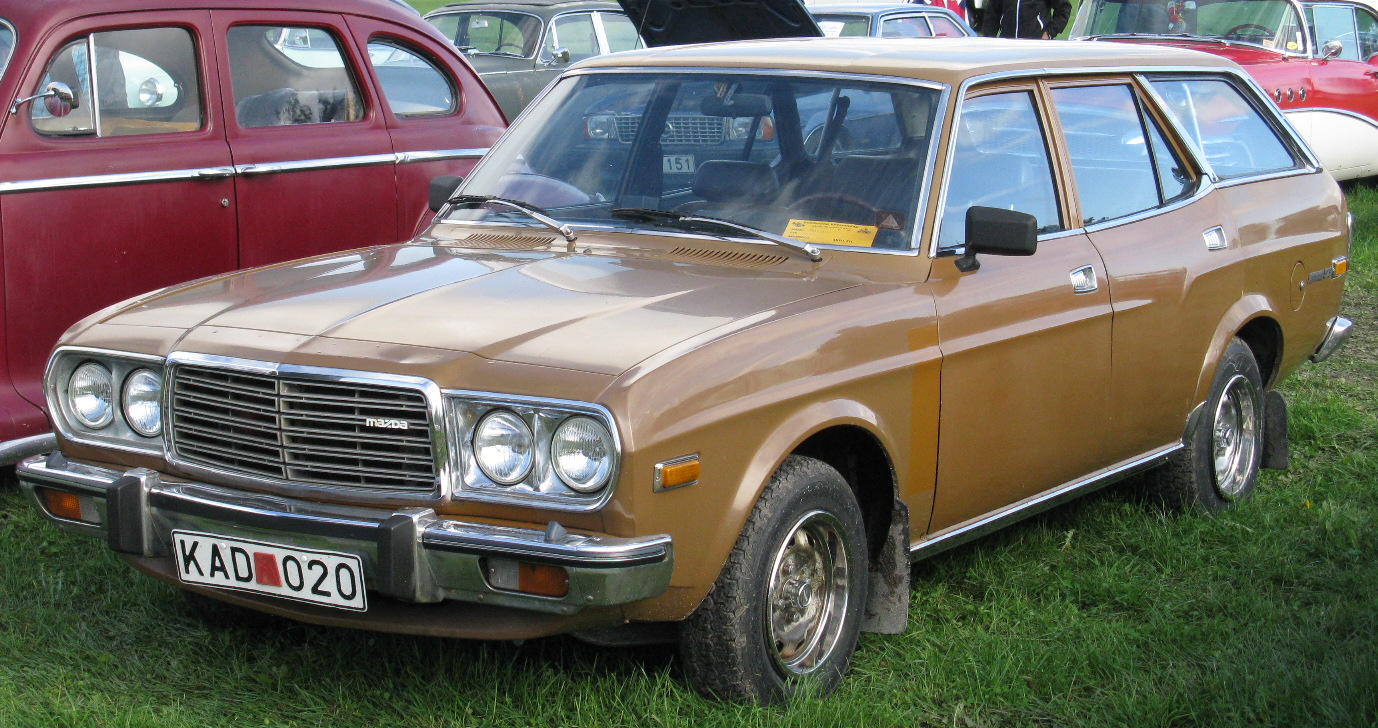
Mazda Luce wagon

== LA4 (1978–1981) ==
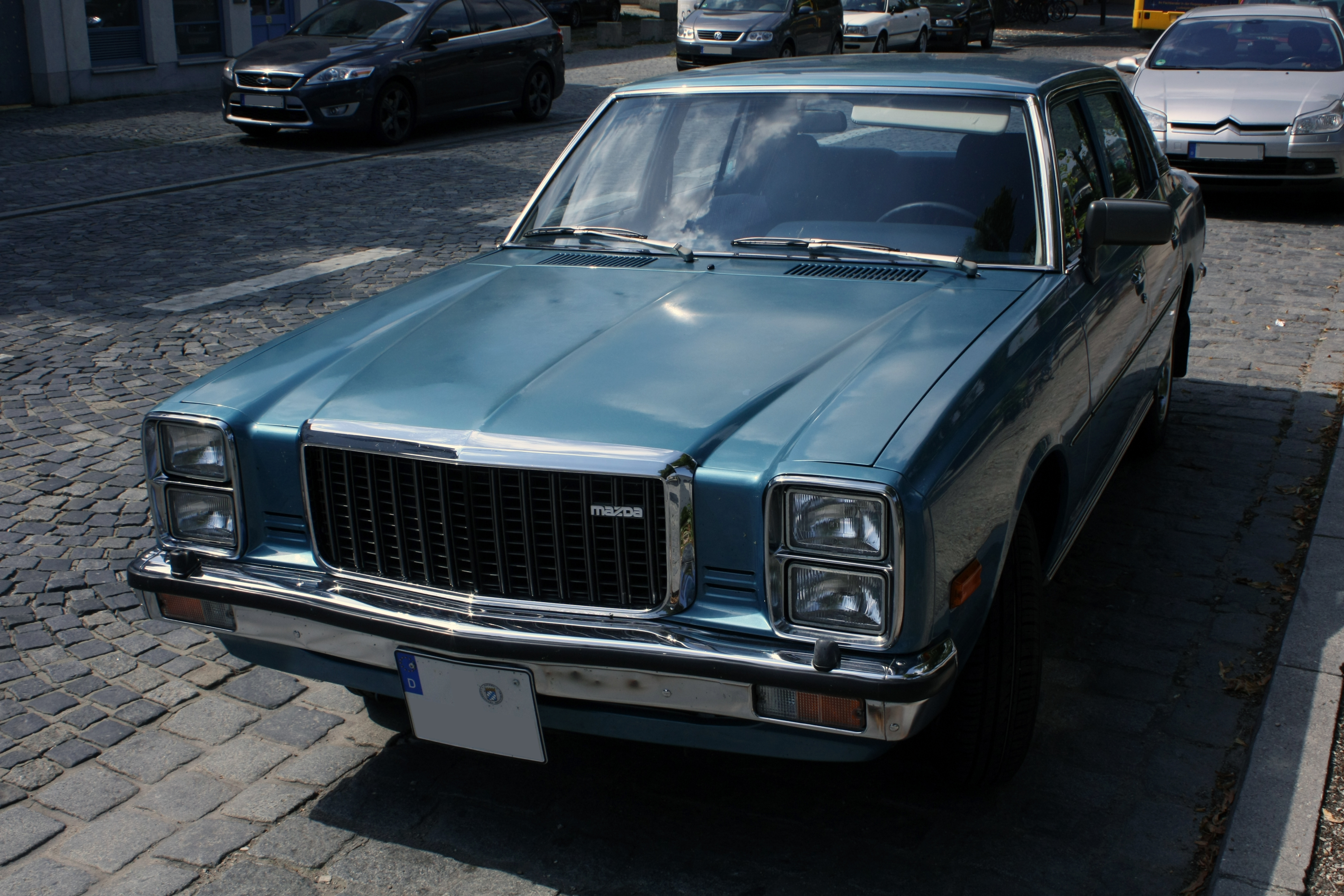
Mazda Luce sedan

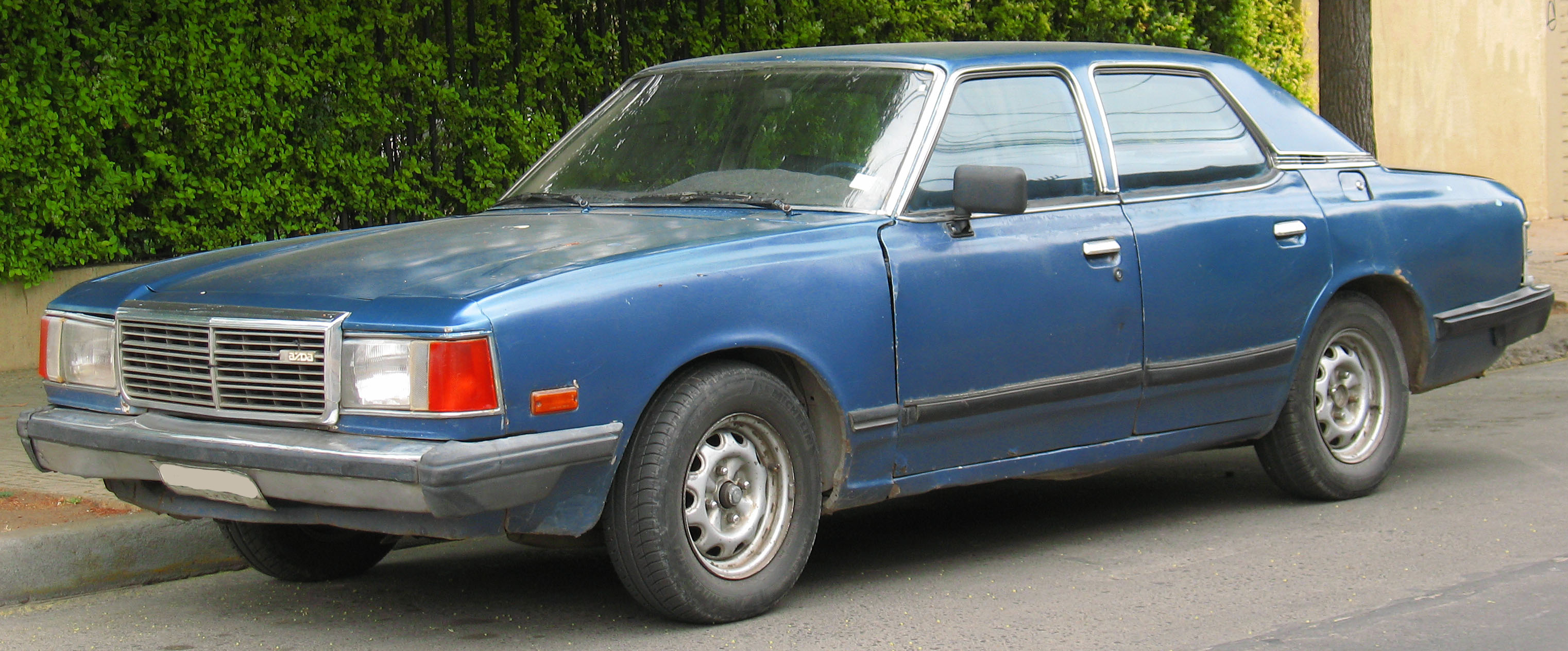
Mazda Luce hardtop sedan

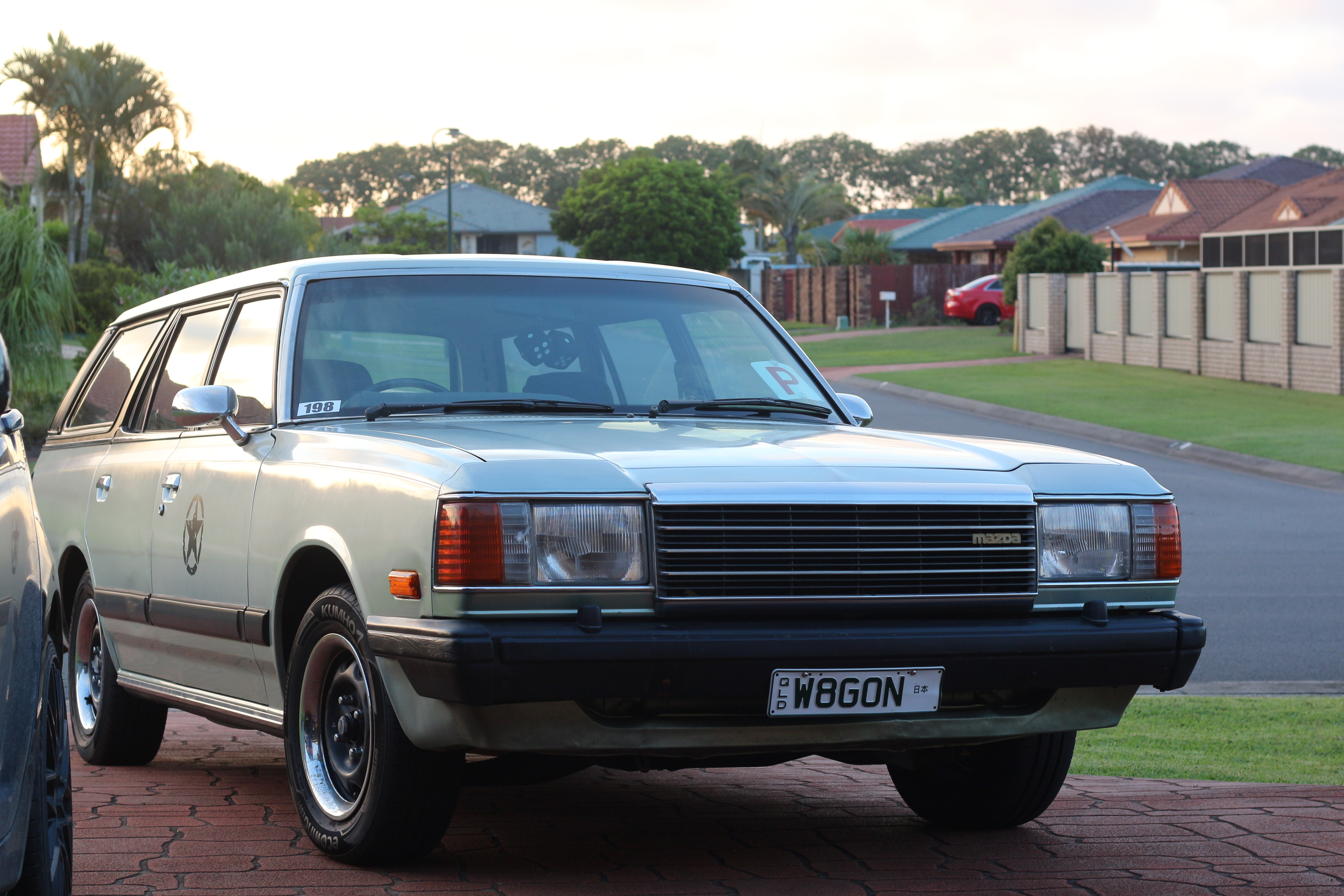
Mazda 929 Station Wagon (LA4)

== HB (1982–1987) ==
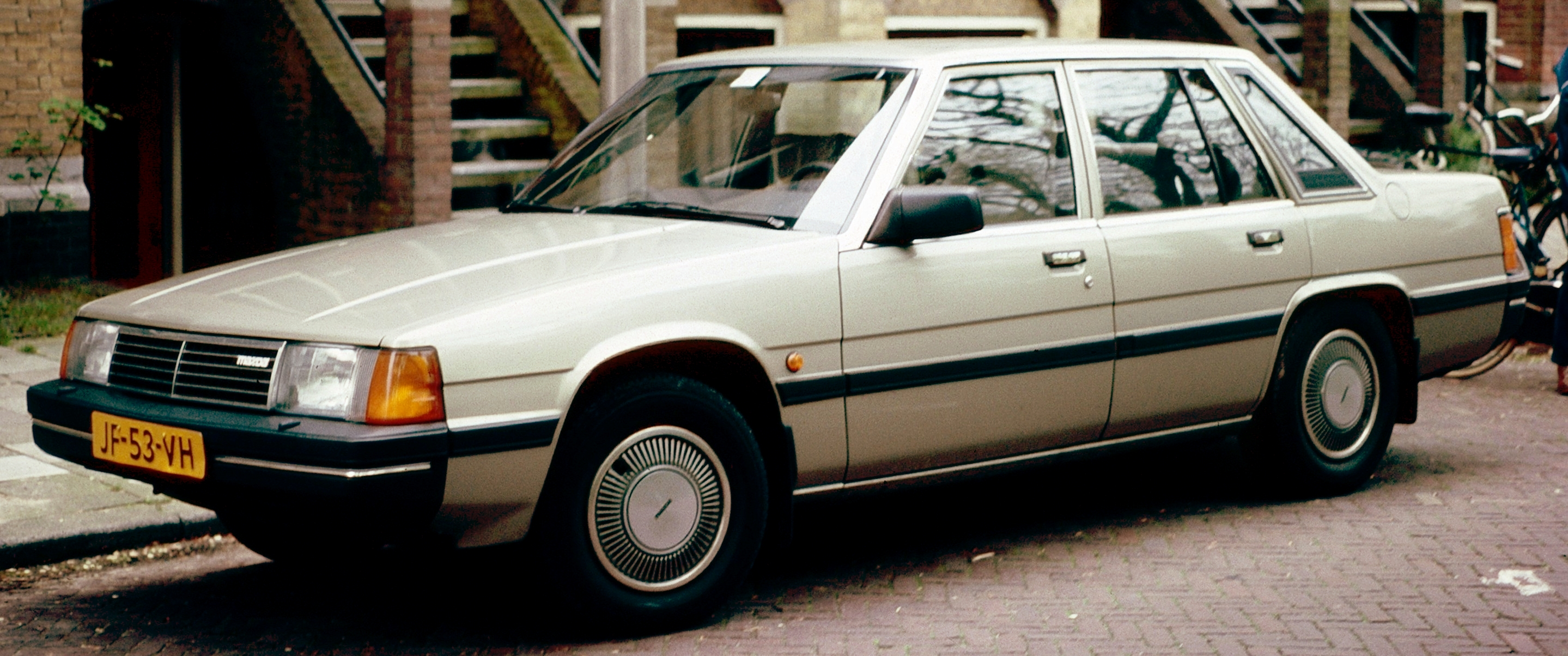
Mazda Luce hardtop sedan

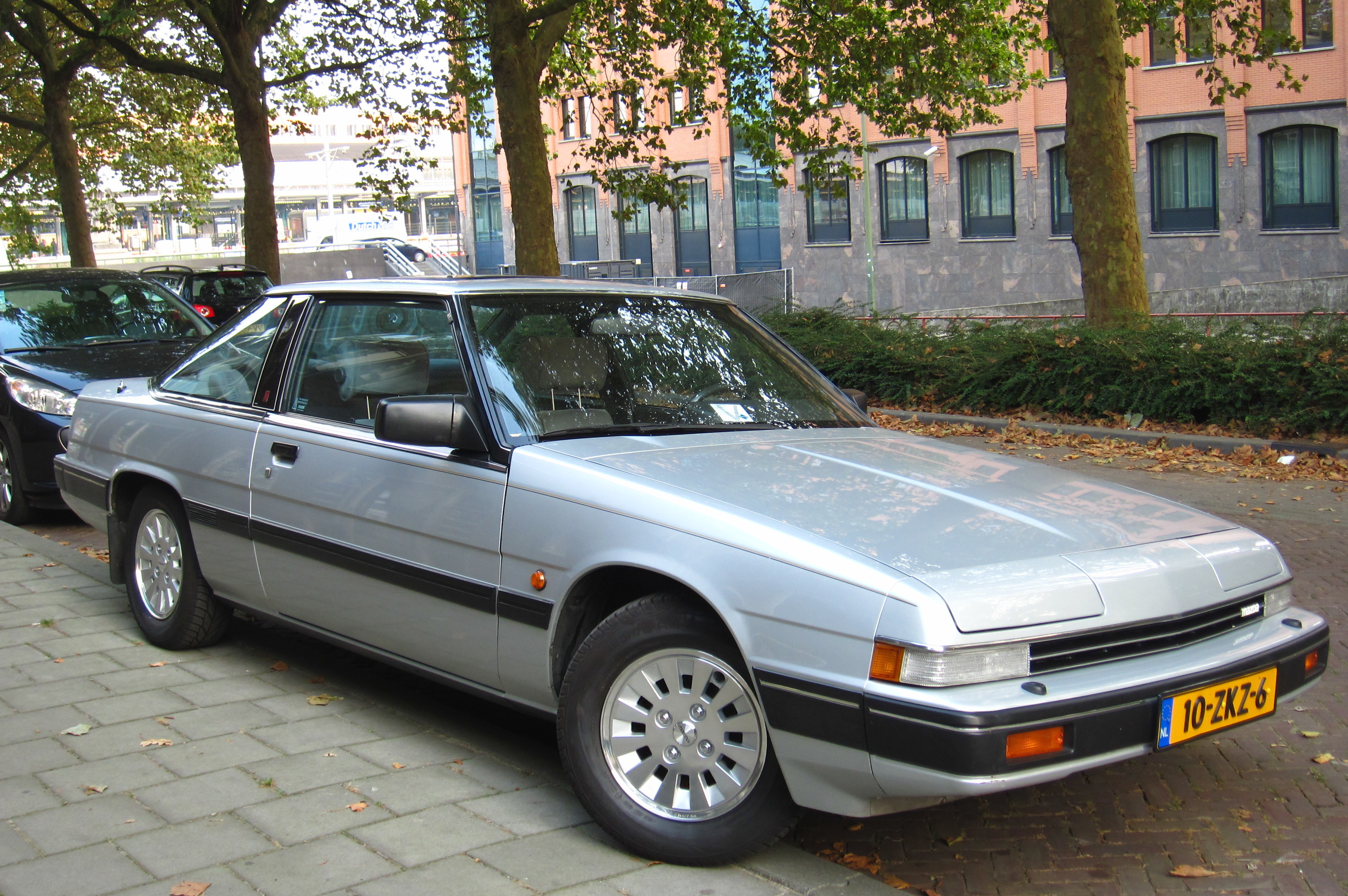
Mazda Cosmo coupe

== HC (1986–1991) ==
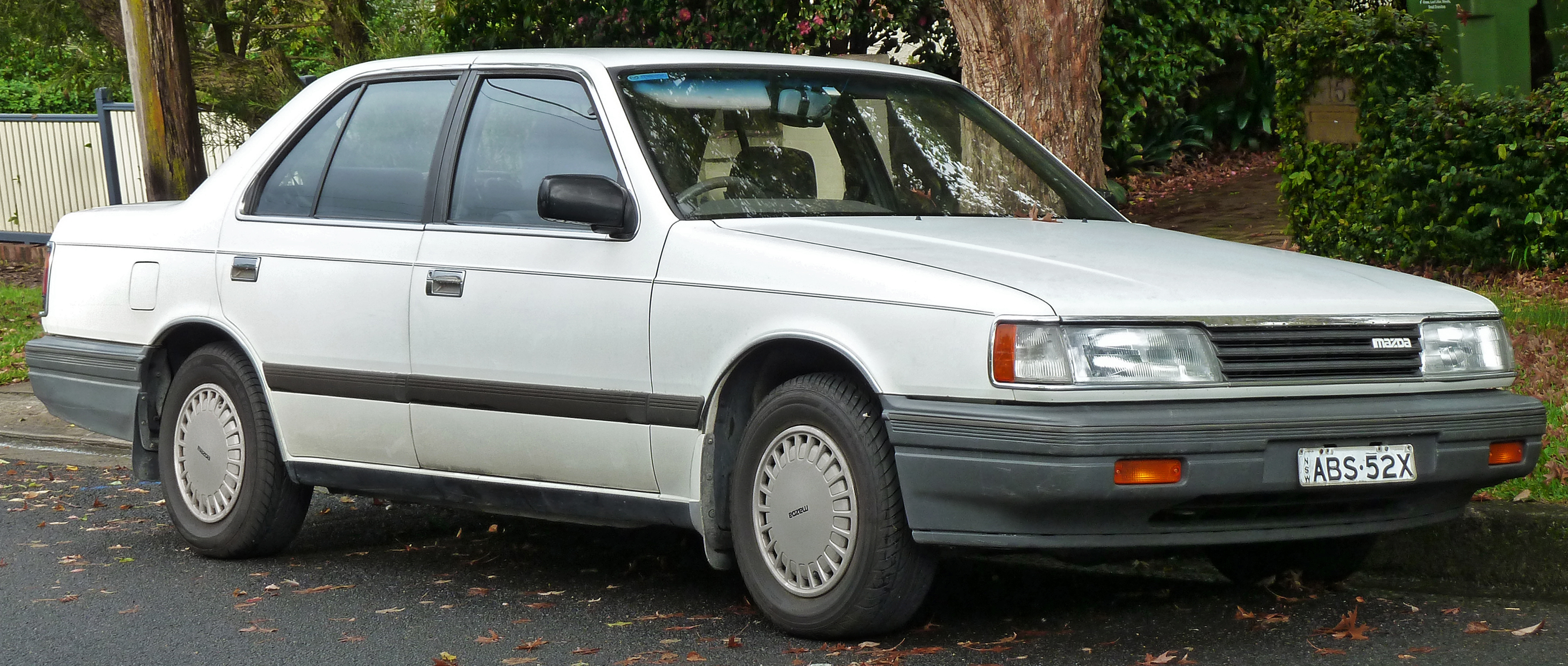
Mazda Luce sedan

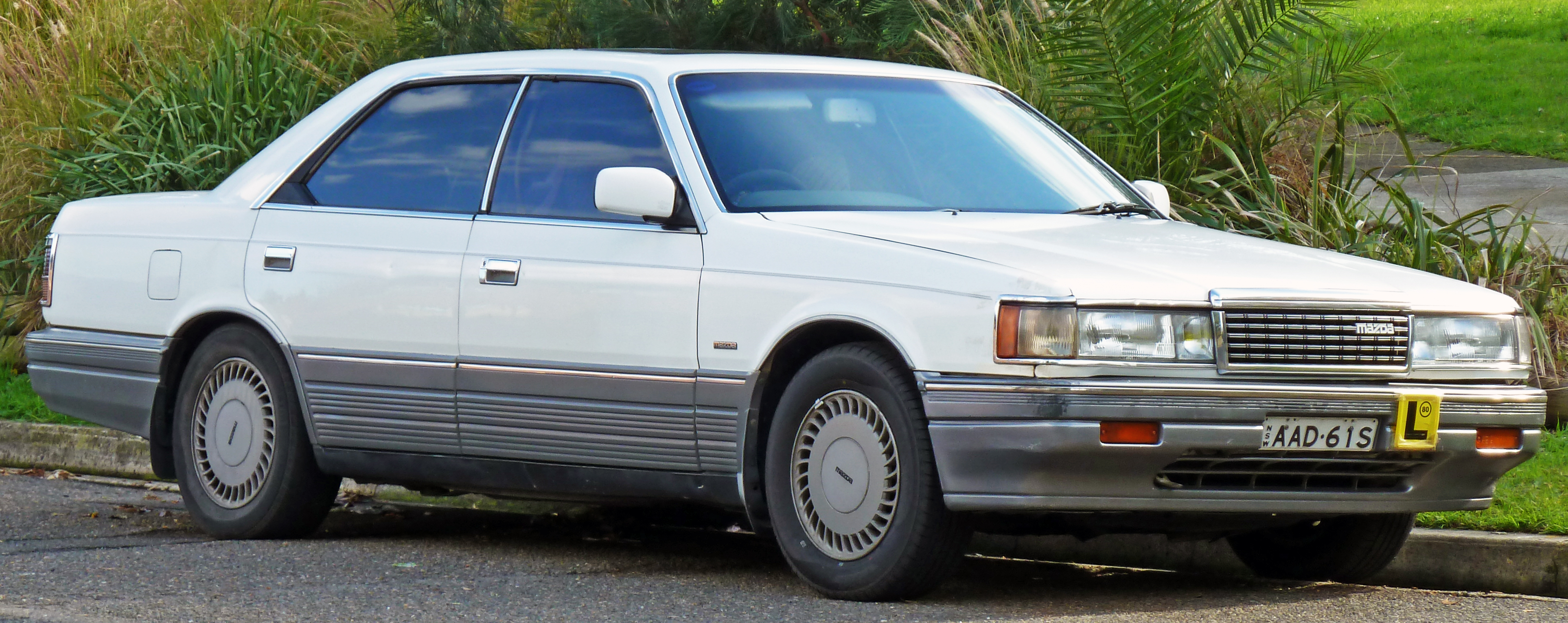
Mazda Luce hardtop sedan

== HD (1991–1995) ==
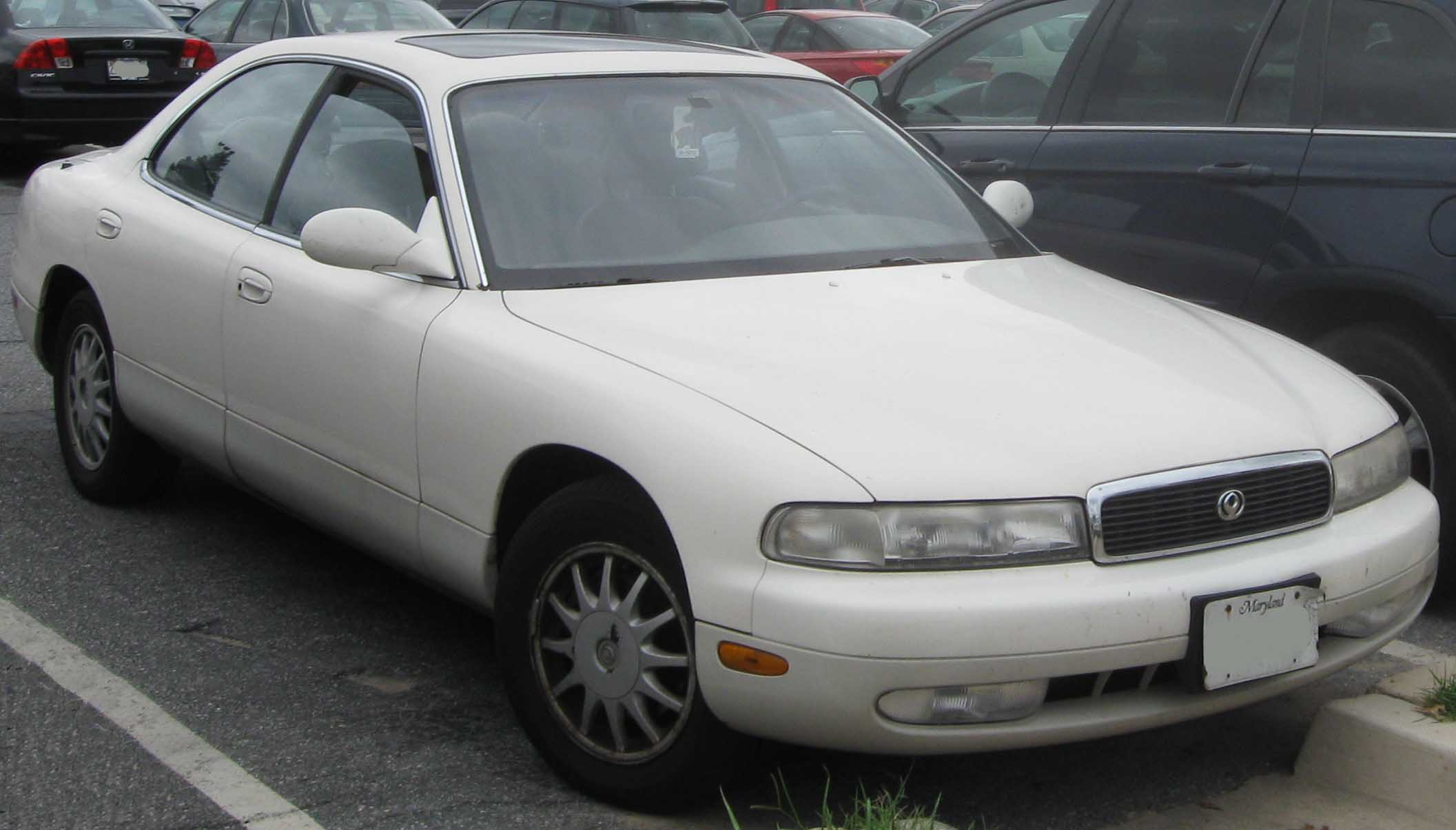
Mazda Sentia sedan

== HE (1996–1997) ==
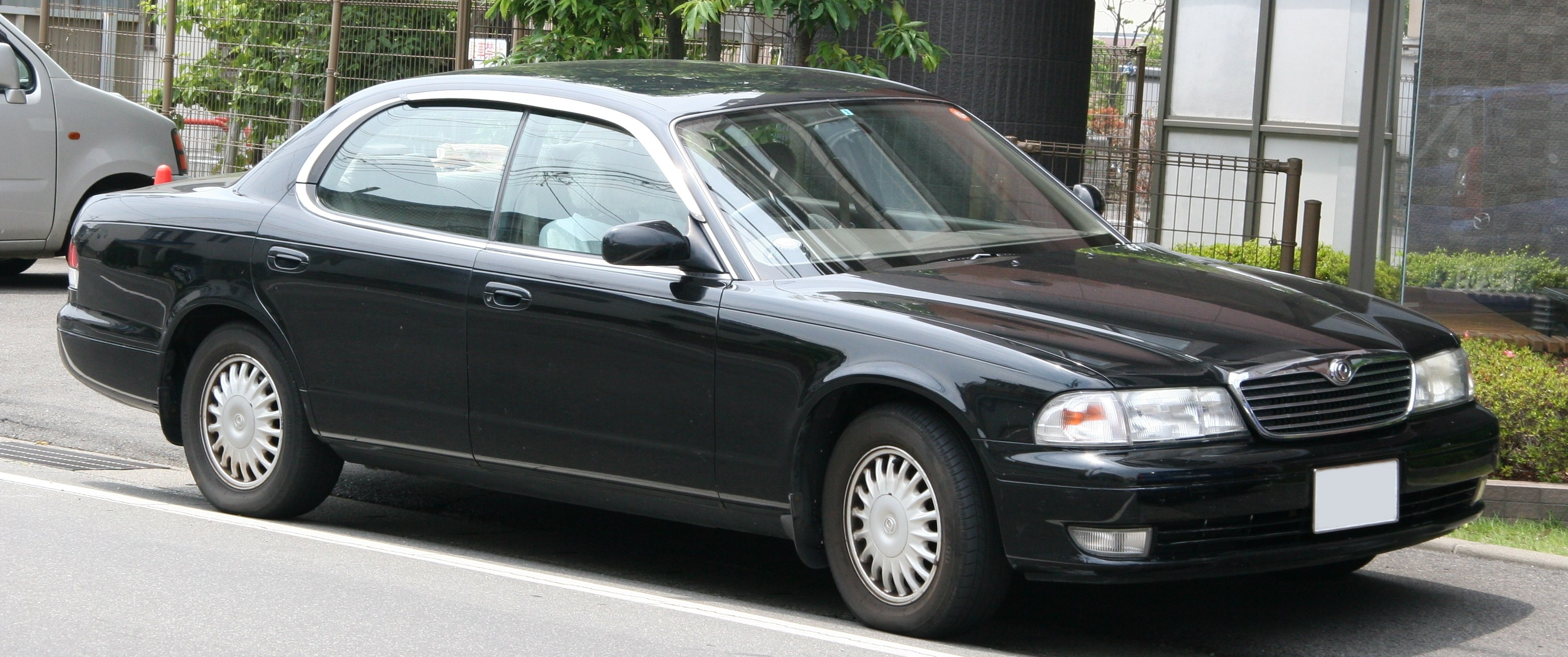
Mazda Sentia sedan
