= Mazda Kazamai =

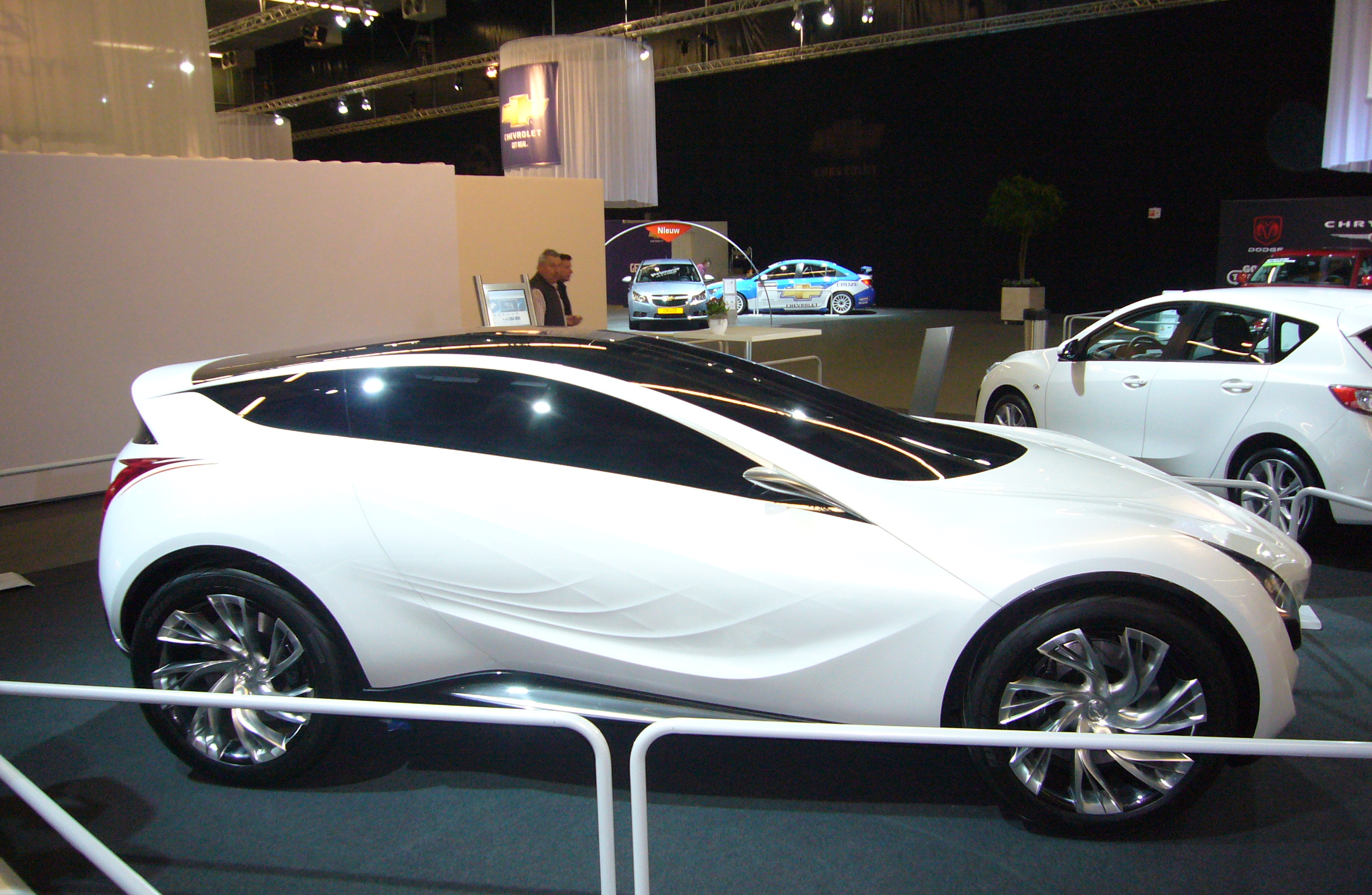

Overview
- Manufacturer: Mazda
- Production: 2008 concept car
- Designer: Laurens van den Acker

Body and chassis
- Class: Crossover
- Body style: 2-door compact crossover
- Layout: F4 layout
- Related: Mazda Nagare; Mazda Ryuga; Mazda Hakaze; Mazda Taiki; Mazda Furai; Mazda Kiyora

Powertrain
- Engine: MZR 2.0 L DISI
- Transmission: six-speed automatic

Dimensions
- Wheelbase: 2780 mm (109.4 in)
- Length: 4520 mm (178.0 in)
- Width: 1930 mm (76.0 in)
- Height: 1500 mm (59.1 in)

The Mazda Kazamai was a concept car made by the Japanese car manufacturer Mazda. It was first introduced at the 2008 Moscow International Motor Show in August.

== Styling ==
The Mazda Kazamai was number six in a series of concept cars with the Nagare flow design language. The design featured panel lines inspired by crosswinds in nature which evoke visual lightness. The car also had a bold five-point grille, accentuated front wheel arches and sleek roof line, which were combined with large 22-inch wheels.

== Technology ==
Thanks to its aerodynamic design, evolved lightweight body structure and use of aluminium, 2.0 L DISI direct injection engine and lightweight 6-speed automatic transmission, the Kazamai had a 30% better performance and fuel economy and CO_{2} emissions compared to the foregoing 2.0 L gasoline engine.

=== Specifications ===
- Engine: MZR 2.0 L DISI gasoline
- Transmission: 6-speed automatic
- Suspension
  - Front: MacPherson Strut
  - Rear: Multi-link
- Drive: four-wheel drive
- Tires (Front/Rear) 265/45 R22 Bridgestone
- Seating capacity: 4 people

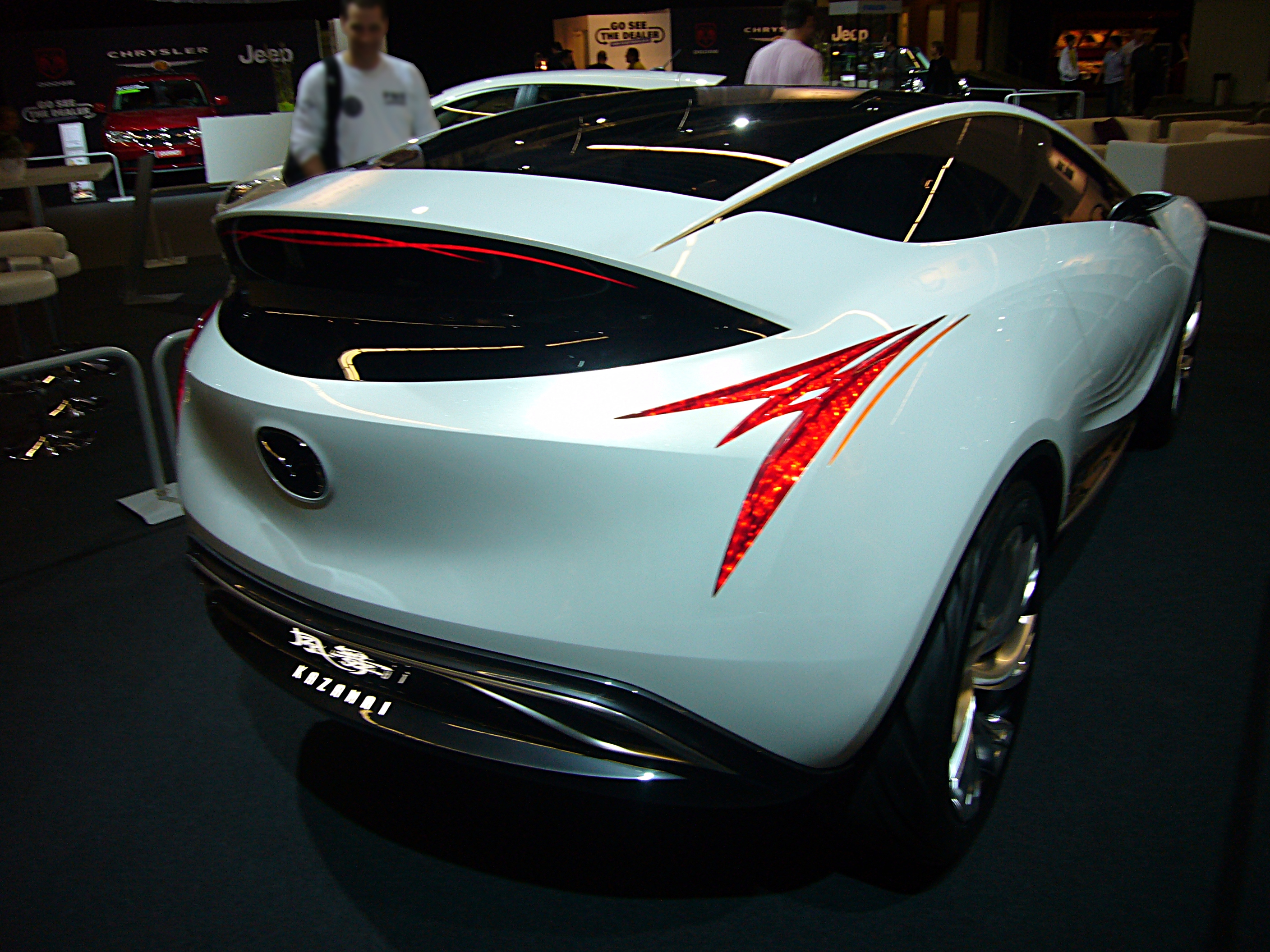
Rear view
