= Mazda Nagare (car design) =

Nagare

Overview
- Manufacturer: Mazda
- Production: 2006–2007
- Designer: Franz von Holzhausen; Laurens van den Acker

Body and chassis
- Class: Concept car
- Related: Mazda Nagare; Mazda Ryuga; Mazda Hakaze; Mazda Taiki; Mazda Furai

Powertrain
- Engine: Mazda MZR engine Mazda Wankel engine

Chronology
- Successor: Kodo design language

Nagare (流; flow) is an automotive design language created by Franz von Holzhausen and Laurens van den Acker for Mazda. Incorporated into a number of concept cars, starting with the car of the same name, the Nagare design lineup was intended as a showcase of what Mazda's cars may have looked like in 2020.

It was abandoned by Mazda in 2011 in favour of the Kodo design series, starting with their Shinari concept car.

== Motif and examples ==
The influence of the designs are wind and flow. These can be seen in the cars' design, where areas of the cars contain flowing lines.

Production cars in Mazda's late-2000s lineup, such as the second-generation Mazda3 and Mazda6, could easily be identified by swooping leaf-shaped headlamps, while the third-generation Mazda Premacy had flowing lines sculpted into the bodywork.

=== Nomenclature ===
All concept vehicles have names in which represent Nagare's "wind and flow" theme in one way or another.

== Concept cars ==
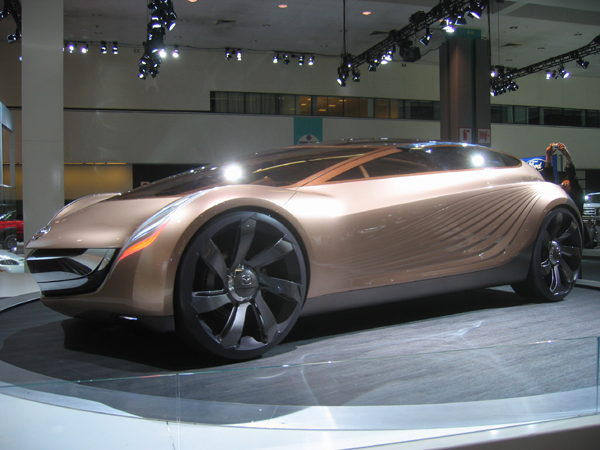
The Mazda Nagare, the first in the design series

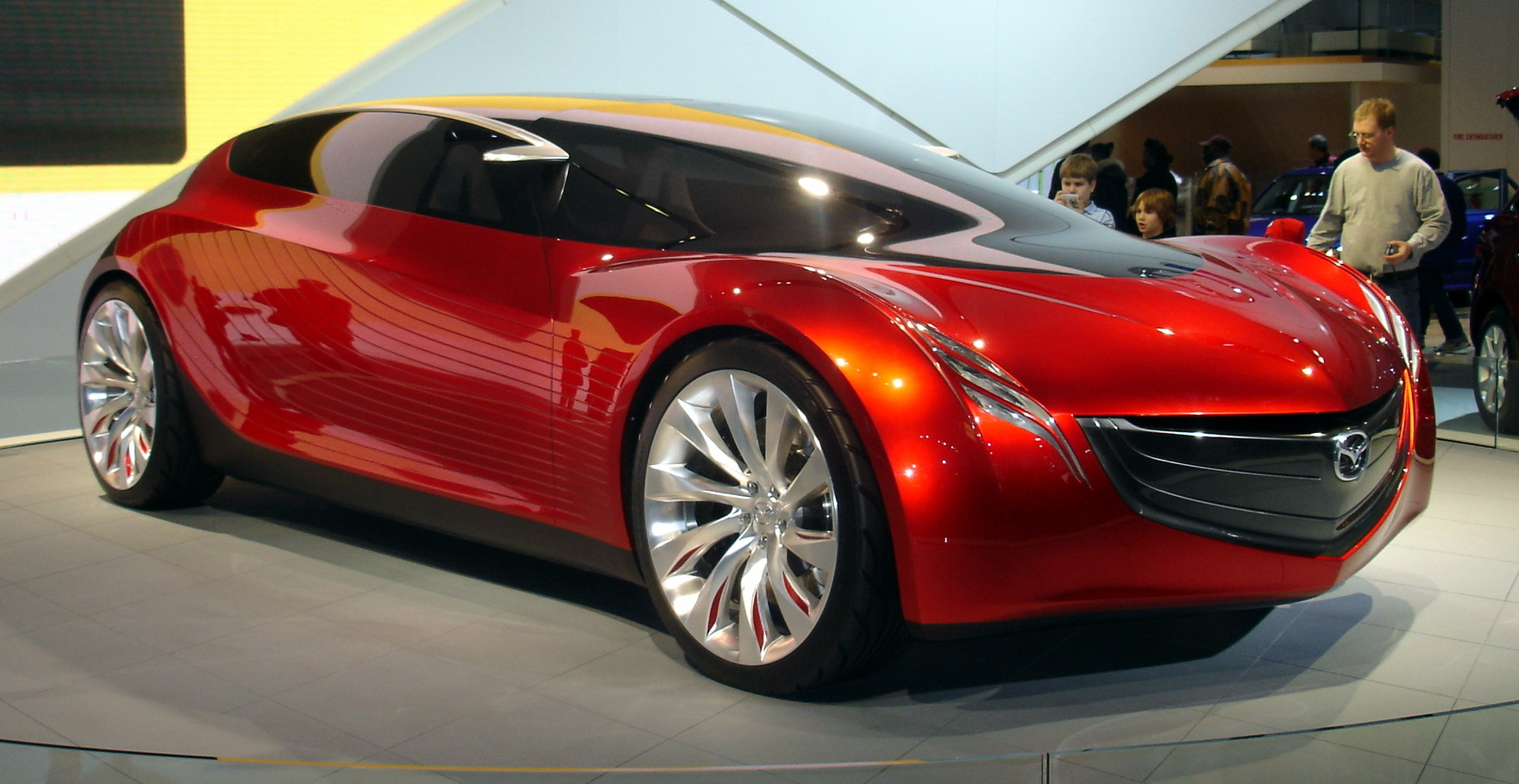
The Mazda Ryuga, the second in the design series

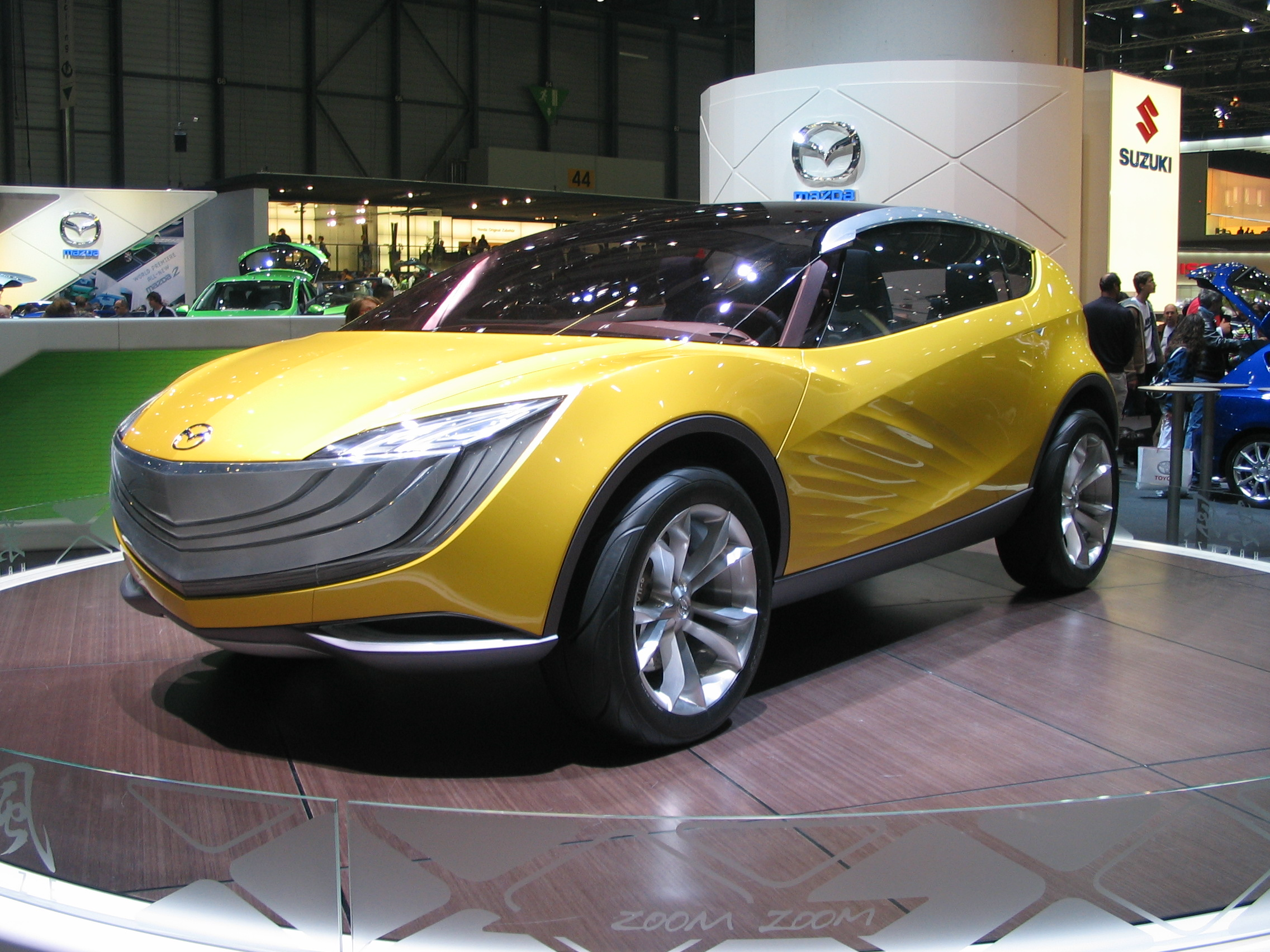
The Mazda Hakaze, the third in the design series

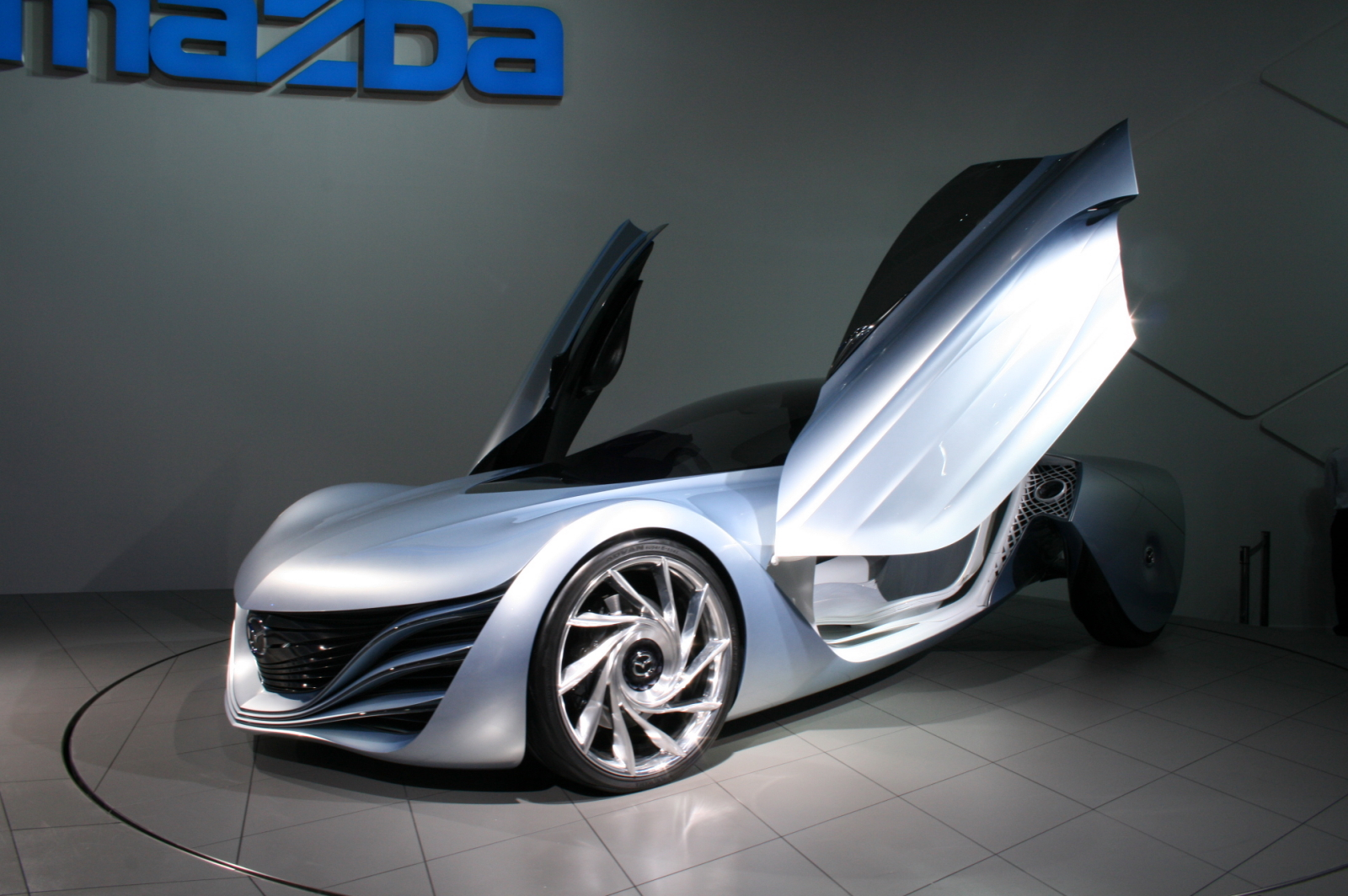
The Mazda Taiki, the fourth in the design series

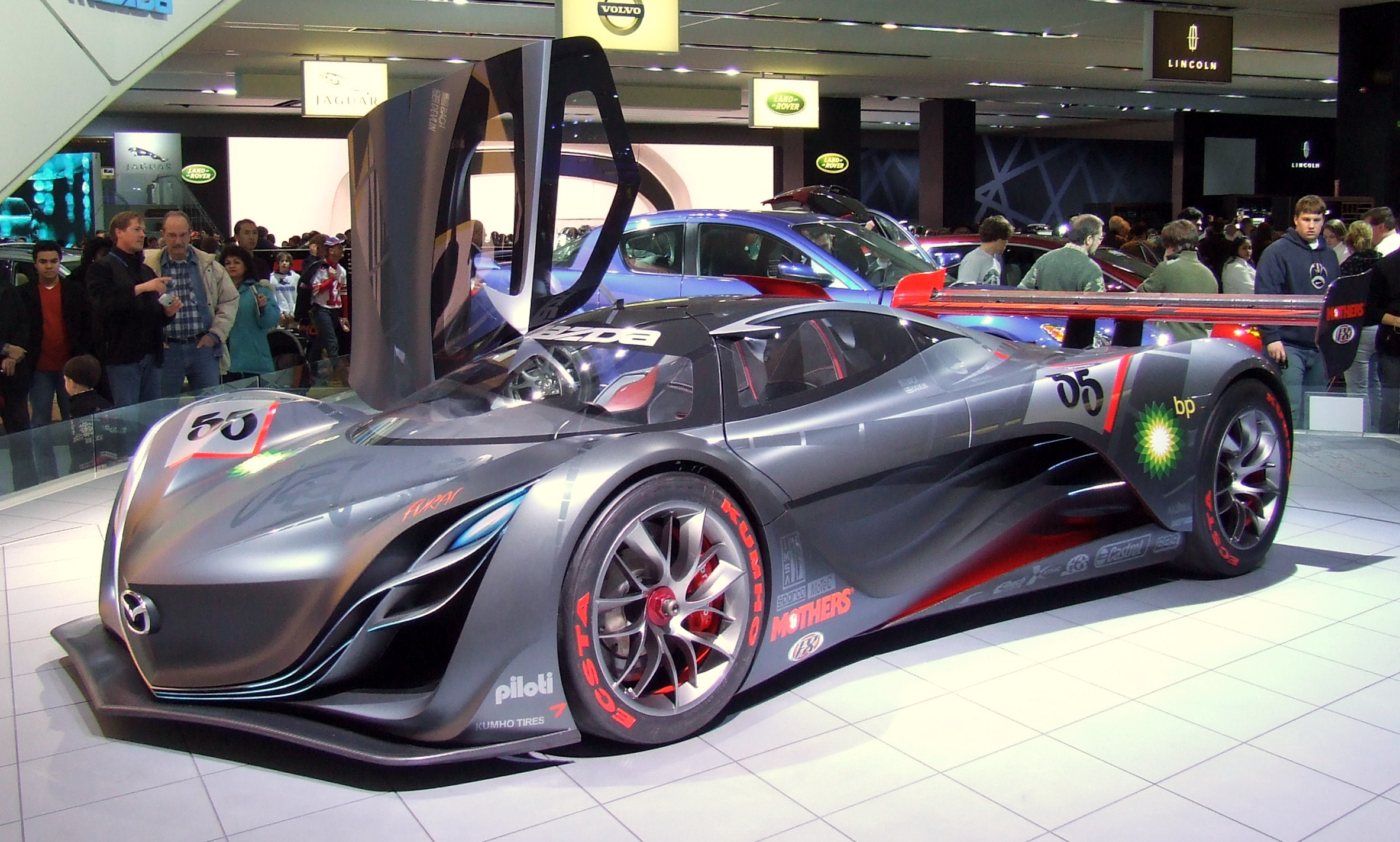
The Mazda Furai, the fifth in the series, and the most storied and most popular Nagare car

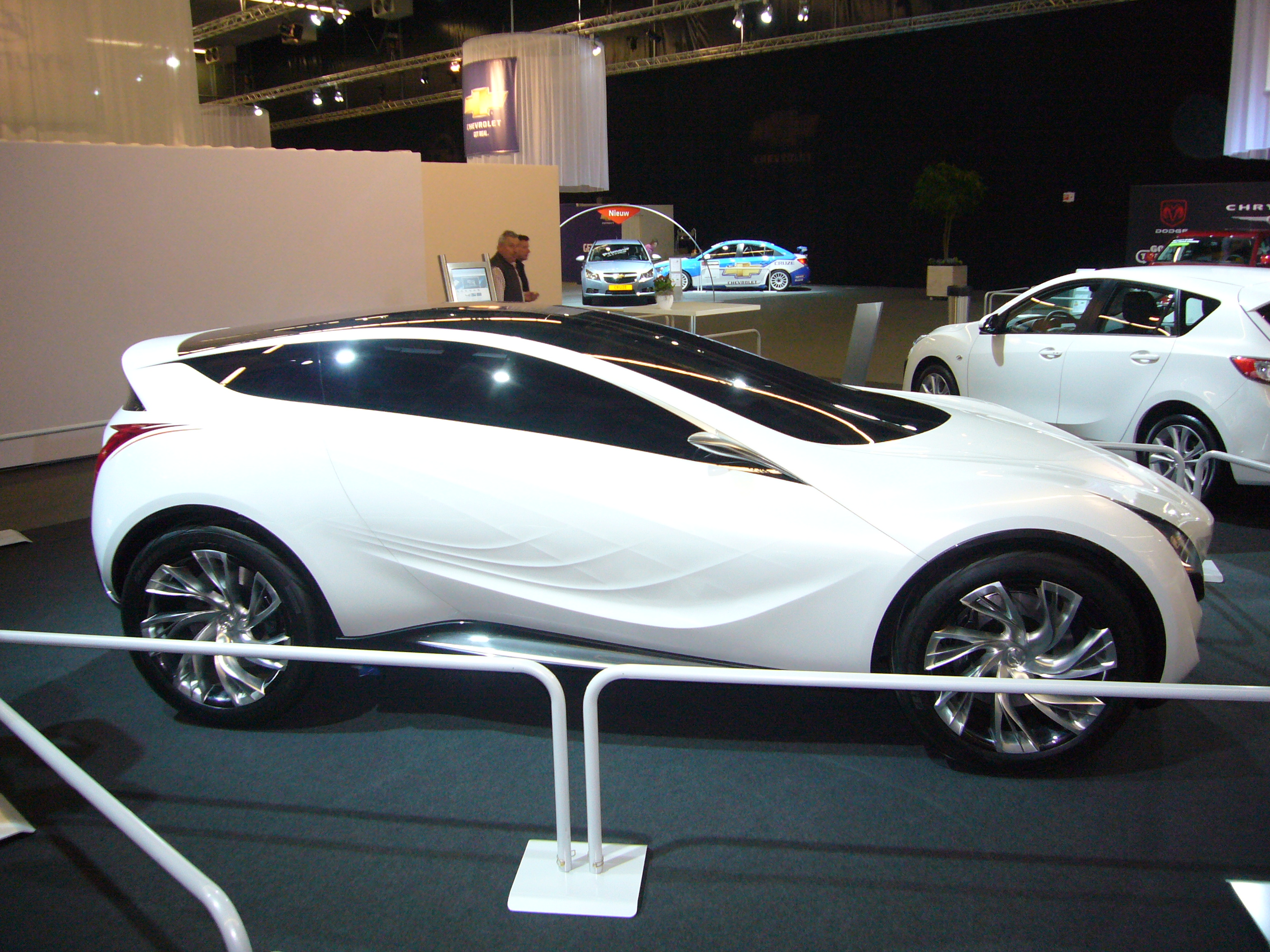
The Mazda Kazamai, the sixth in the design series

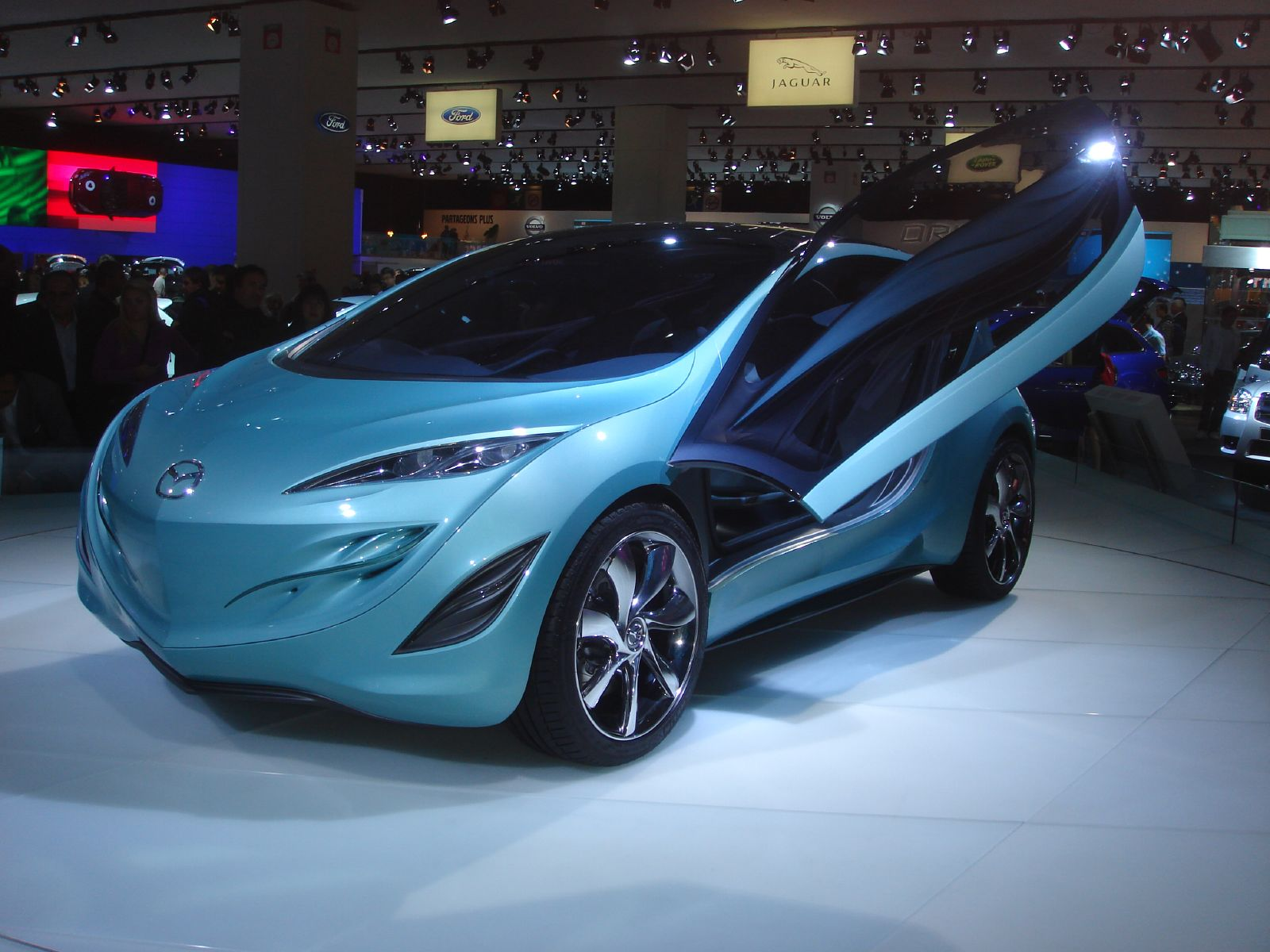
The Mazda Kiyora, the seventh in the design series

=== Nagare ===
The Mazda Nagare is the first car built under the Nagare design language, and shares its name with the language itself. The car debuted at the 2006 LA Auto Show.

The Nagare takes the form of a long-wheelbase Kammback sports car. The futuristic interior is very irregular, with the driver placed front and center under the roof's highest point, and three additional passengers seated behind in a "wrap-around lounge". The Nagare also has butterfly doors that span nearly the entire wheelbase. The Nagare's engine is non-existent, as it is not a running prototype.

Designer Franz von Holzhausen mentioned during an interview at Autoblog that he took inspiration from nature and applied it to the Nagare concept. Some of von Holzhausen's words are typed below:

"We began by studying motion and the effect it has on natural surroundings: how wind shapes sand in the desert, how water moves across the ocean floor, and the look of lava flowing down a mountainside. Natural motion registers an impression in your brain and that's what we hoped to capture with the new Nagare surface language. Once we started sketching our ideas, we weren't surprised to find similar quests underway in other product design disciplines. We found examples of motion influencing the shape and surface of furniture, architecture, apparel, and artwork. Nagare undoubtedly proves our confidence in identifying a new and exciting visual language for Mazda as we lead the way in defining the interaction of motion and flow in automobile surfacing."

=== Ryuga ===
The Mazda Ryuga is the second vehicle built under the Nagare series. The name Ryuga (流雅; gracious flow) references the purpose of the design. The car features gull-wing doors and a futuristic interior, hinting at Mazda's planned future in design. It is powered by a 2.5-litre Mazda MZR inline-four engine.

=== Hakaze ===
The Mazda Hakaze (葉風; leaf wind) is the third car to be featured in the series. The car has a crossover body style with scissor doors. According to Mazda, the car was more production-ready than the Ryuga and Nagare. It is powered by a 2.3-litre MZR engine.

=== Taiki ===
The Mazda Taiki is the fourth vehicle featured in the series. The name Taiki (大気; large atmosphere) is intended to complement the car's atmospheric canopy surrounding the driver and passenger; its interior continues the flowing design theme. The rear wheels appear to extend out from the body. Power comes from an improved version of the 13B Renesis Wankel engine used in the RX-8.

=== Furai ===
The Mazda Furai is the fifth car in the series. It is also the most storied and most popular Nagare-styled car.

The Furai is based on the Courage C65 LMP2 prototype that Mazda used for the American Le Mans Series. The car runs on E100 ethanol, making the Furai's R20B the first rotary engine to implement ethanol fuel. The engine is a midship-mounted R20B Renesis Wankel engine producing 450 hp (336 kW; 456 PS) and coupled to a 6-speed Xtrac semi-automatic transmission. The engine was built by American company Racing Beat, who also made the rotor-shaped muffler. The name Furai (風籟; wind's sound) is also a reference to the Nagare "wind and flow" motif. The car wears the number 55 as a tribute to the Mazda 787B.

The Furai was tested on many circuits, such as Mazda Raceway Laguna Seca. In 2008, the car was destroyed after catching fire during a Top Gear photoshoot. This event was fully revealed to the public in 2013.

=== Kazamai ===
The Mazda Kazamai is the sixth Nagare car. Taking the form of a compact crossover designed for the Russian market, it is powered by a 2.0-litre engine with direct injection to increase both performance and fuel economy and decrease emissions. The name Kazamai (風舞; wind's dance; swirling wind) serves as its motif, with aerodynamic styling inspired by crosswinds, large 22-inch wheels, and the use of aluminium to reduce weight.

=== Kiyora ===
The Mazda Kiyora (清; pure) is the seventh car in the Nagare concept series. Unveiled at the 2008 Paris Motor Show, it is a water-themed, city-oriented compact car with transparent polycarbonate butterfly doors and a water filter that converts rainwater collected on the car's roof into drinking water. The Kiyora also possesses a haptic touchscreen designed to mimic the rippling of water.
