= Nagare =

Nagare may refer to:

== People ==
- Nagare Hagiwara (1953–2015), Japanese actor and TV personality
- Masayuki Nagare (1923–2018), a modernist Japanese sculptor
- Yutaka Nagare (born 1992) Japanese professional rugby union player

== Characters ==
- Nagare, a villain in the anime and manga series Naruto
- Nagare Akatsuki, a character in the manga and anime series Martian Successor Nadesico
- Nagare Namikawa, a character in the videogame series Rival Schools: United by Fate
- Ryoma Nagare, a character in the manga and anime series Getter Robo
- Nagare Tatsumi (巽 ナガレ), a characters from Tatsumi family in Kyuukyuu Sentai GoGoFive
- Suiseiken Nagare, the sword of Kamen Rider Blades, a character from the Japanese tokusatsu series Kamen Rider Saber

== Places ==
- Nagaré, is a town in the Bogandé Department
- Nagare temple ruins, (流廃寺跡) is an archaeological site

== Other uses ==
- Mazda Nagare, a concept car
- Mazda Nagare (car design), is an automotive design language
- Nagare-zukuri, is a traditional Shinto shrine architectural style
