= Mazda Kiyora =

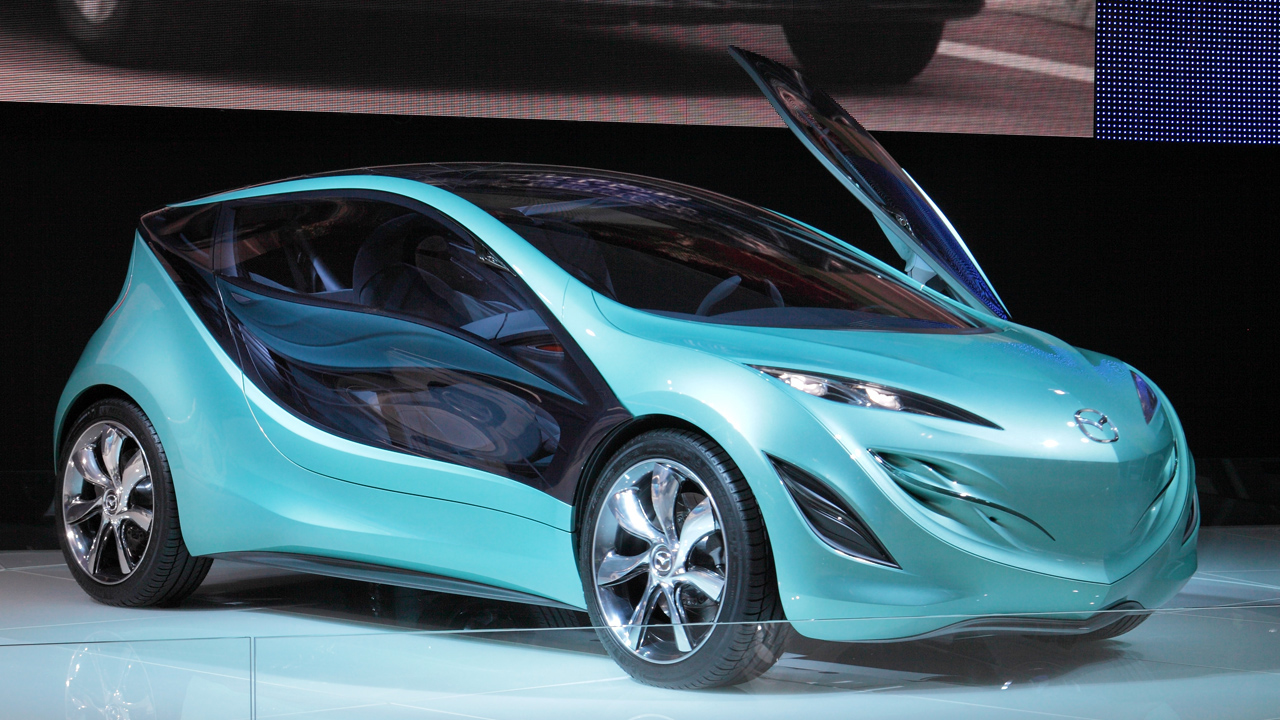

Overview
- Manufacturer: Mazda
- Designer: Laurens van den Acker

Body and chassis
- Class: Concept car
- Body style: Hatchback
- Doors: 3

Powertrain
- Engine: 1.3L SKY-G I4
- Transmission: 6-speed SKY-G Drive automatic

Dimensions
- Length: 3,770 mm (12 ft 4 in)
- Height: 1,350 mm (4 ft 5 in)

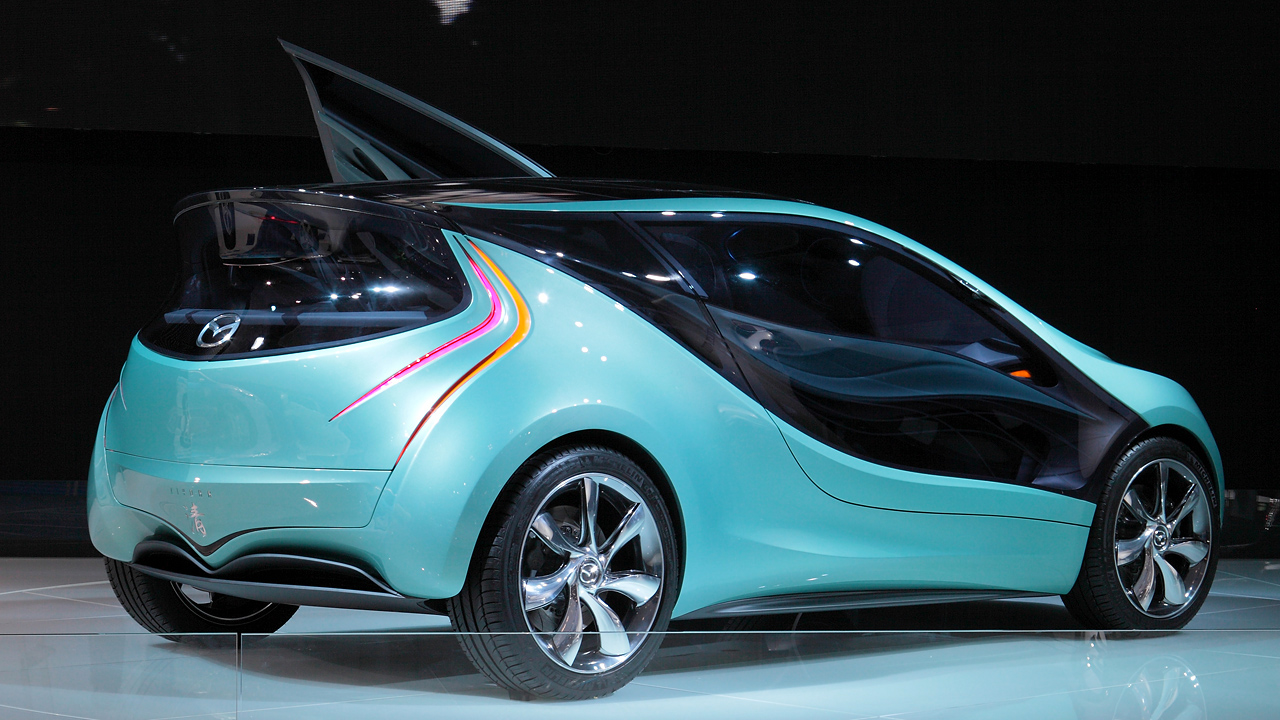
Rear view

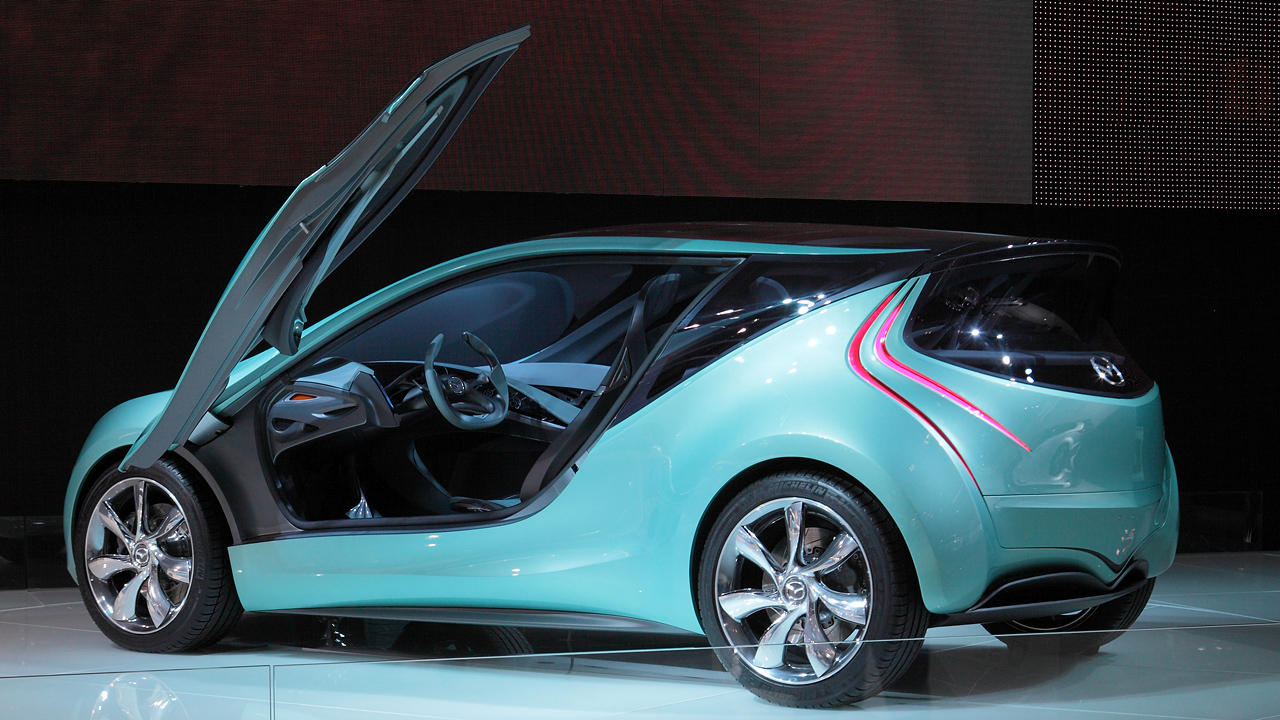
Rear view with door open

The Mazda Kiyora (Japanese: マツダ・清, Hepburn: Matsuda Kiyora) is a concept car made by Mazda and first introduced at the 2008 Paris Motor Show. It served as a design study for a next-generation urban subcompact car, one intended to replace the Mazda2, and an engineering study for a high-efficiency gasoline internal combustion engine.

== Design ==
The Kiyora, whose name roughly translates to "pure", was designed for young urban drivers. The design, utilizing water as the theme, was part of the Nagare series of concept cars and a collaborative work between Mazda's core Japanese operations and its European branch.

The Kiyora's hatchback design incorporates two transparent plastic butterfly doors and a glass roof, through which structural elements are visible. The car's droplet-like shape is supplemented by a rear spoiler and aerodynamic underbody for a drag coefficient 10% lower than the contemporaneous Mazda2. Carbon fiber is used to lower weight for efficiency and handling, making the Kiyora 100 kg (220 lb) lighter than the Mazda2. The roof is also equipped with solar cells to provide electricity for the vehicle, as well as a rainwater collection and filtration system. The water is collected into a specially designed LifeSaver bottle for passengers to drink from.

Inside, the car is a four-seater, with the two rear seats being flexible. The Kiyora's dashboard, made with activated carbon for air purification, includes a touchscreen that extends from the instrument cluster to the center console, effectively curving around the driver. This touchscreen would ripple like water when touched, with floating icons that could be re-arranged by the driver.

The Mazda Kiyora would use a 1.3-liter gasoline-powered four-cylinder direct-injection engine employing Mazda's "i-stop" start-stop system and a more efficient six-speed automatic transmission. Regenerative braking would be used to charge the battery. The combination of the Kiyora's lightweight body and efficient powertrain would have resulted in a fuel economy metric of 32 km/L and CO_{2} emissions of no more than 90g/km.
