= Ford Model U =

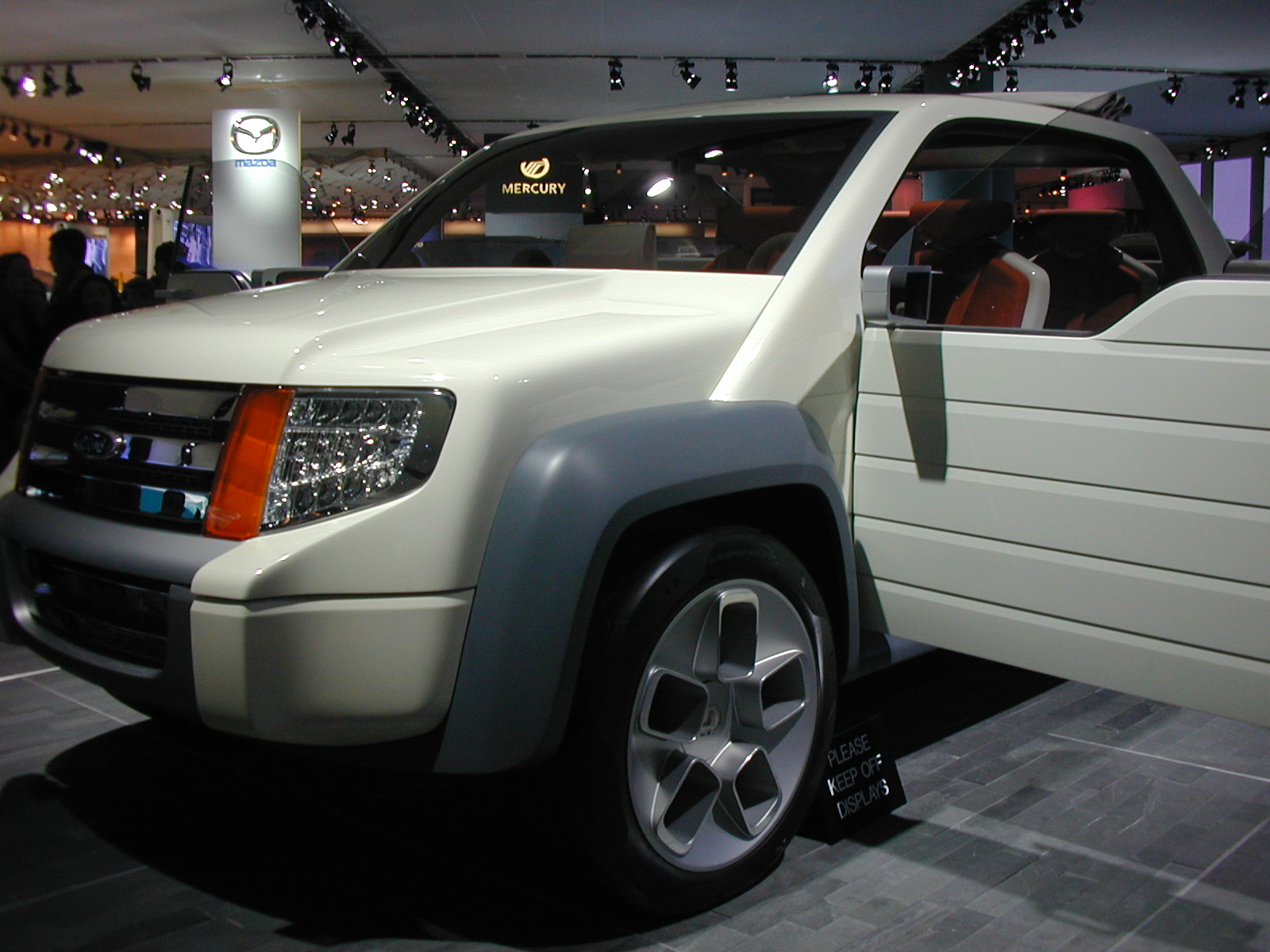

Overview
- Manufacturer: Ford
- Production: 2003

Body and chassis
- Class: Concept car
- Body style: 3-door pickup

Powertrain
- Engine: 2.3 L supercharged I4 with intercooler (hydrogen)
- Transmission: Hybrid electric

The Ford Model U was a concept pickup manufactured by Ford. It was first introduced at the 2003 North American International Auto Show. Ford designed this vehicle to be a modern 21st century interpretation to the original Ford Model T.

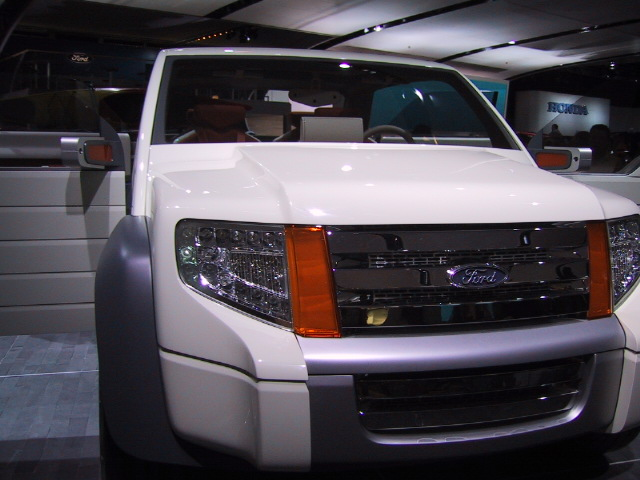
Front

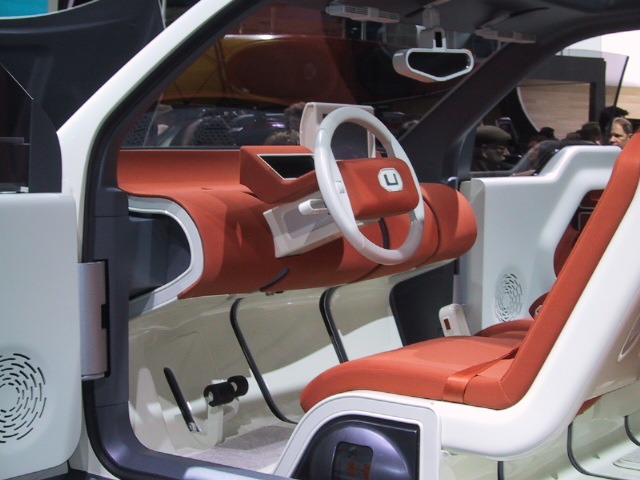
Interior

== Engine ==
The Model U used a 2.3-liter, four-cylinder supercharged, intercooled hydrogen internal combustion I4 engine which also used a hybrid electric transmission. With this type of engine and transmission, this engine lived up to PZEV standards.

== Design ==
The Model U's exterior was soy-based and the interior was highly automated. It had a power-retractable canvas roof and could go from an SUV to a pickup truck with its automatic retractable behind. The interior featured a slot system to reduce clutter. The car was ~95% recyclable and never meant for production.
