= Mazda Taiki =

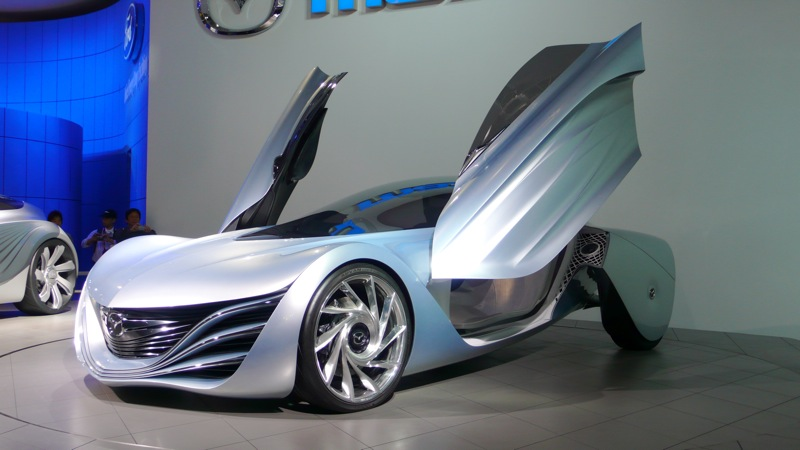

Overview
- Manufacturer: Mazda
- Production: 2007
- Designer: Laurens van den Acker, Joseph Reeve, Atsuhiko Yamada

Body and chassis
- Class: Supercar, Concept car
- Body style: 2-door coupé
- Layout: FR layout
- Doors: Butterfly
- Related: Mazda Nagare; Mazda Ryuga; Mazda Hakaze; Mazda Furai

Powertrain
- Engine: 1600cc 16X Wankel engine
- Transmission: 7-speed Dry twin clutch automatic

The Mazda Taiki (マツダ・大気, Matsuda Taiki) was a one-off concept car produced by Mazda, and was the fourth car in Mazda's 'Nagare' design series. Mazda said the Taiki "reflected one possible direction for a future generation of Mazda sports cars aimed at helping to create a sustainable society".

== The car ==
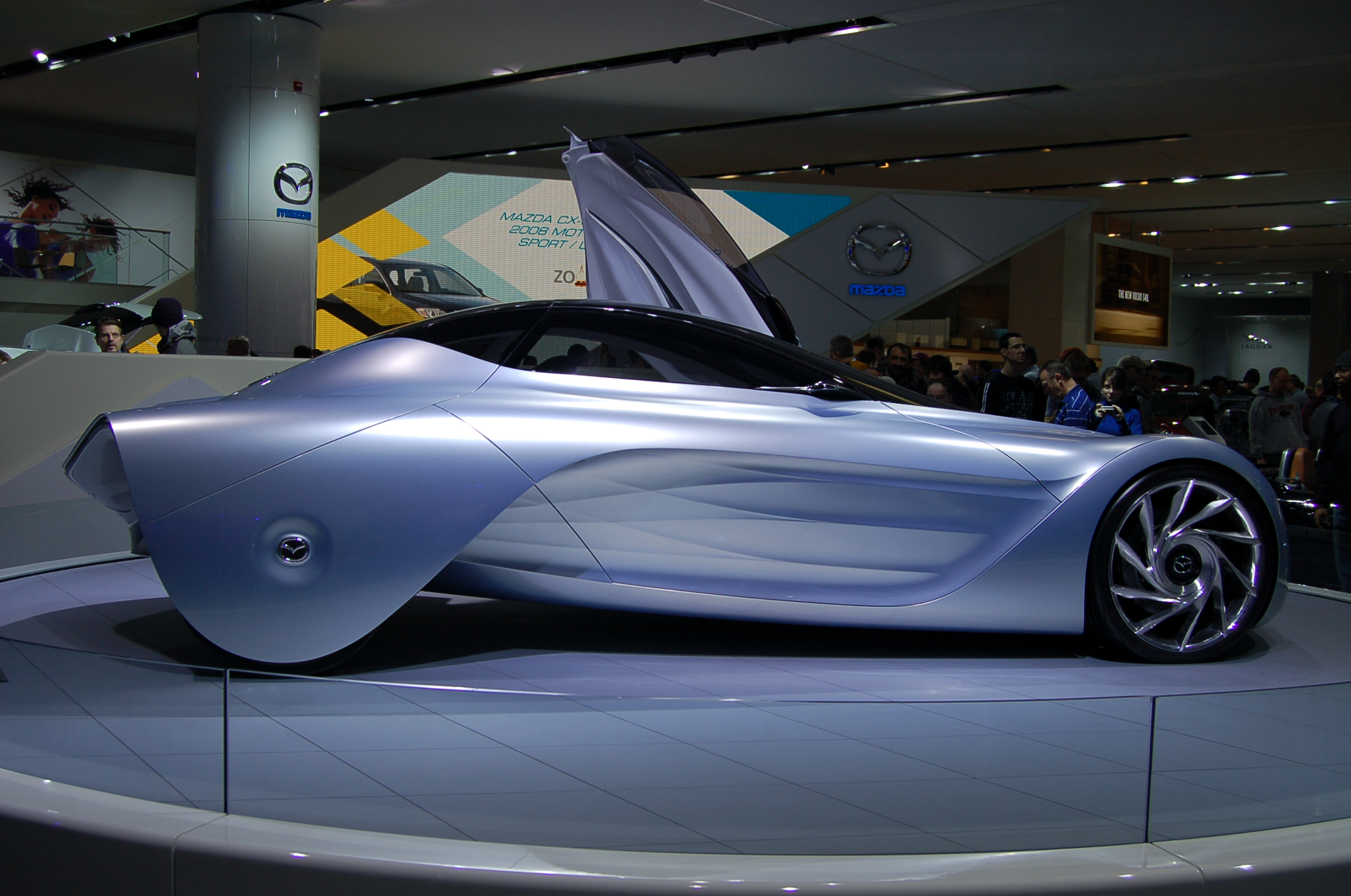
Side view

=== Drivetrain ===
The Taiki used a front engine, rear-wheel drive layout and was powered by Mazda's next generation RENESIS rotary 16X engine, which was mated to a 7-speed, double-clutch gearbox. The 16X engine was said to replace the RX-8's 13B engine. The name Taiki means 'atmosphere' in Japanese.

=== Design ===
==== Exterior ====
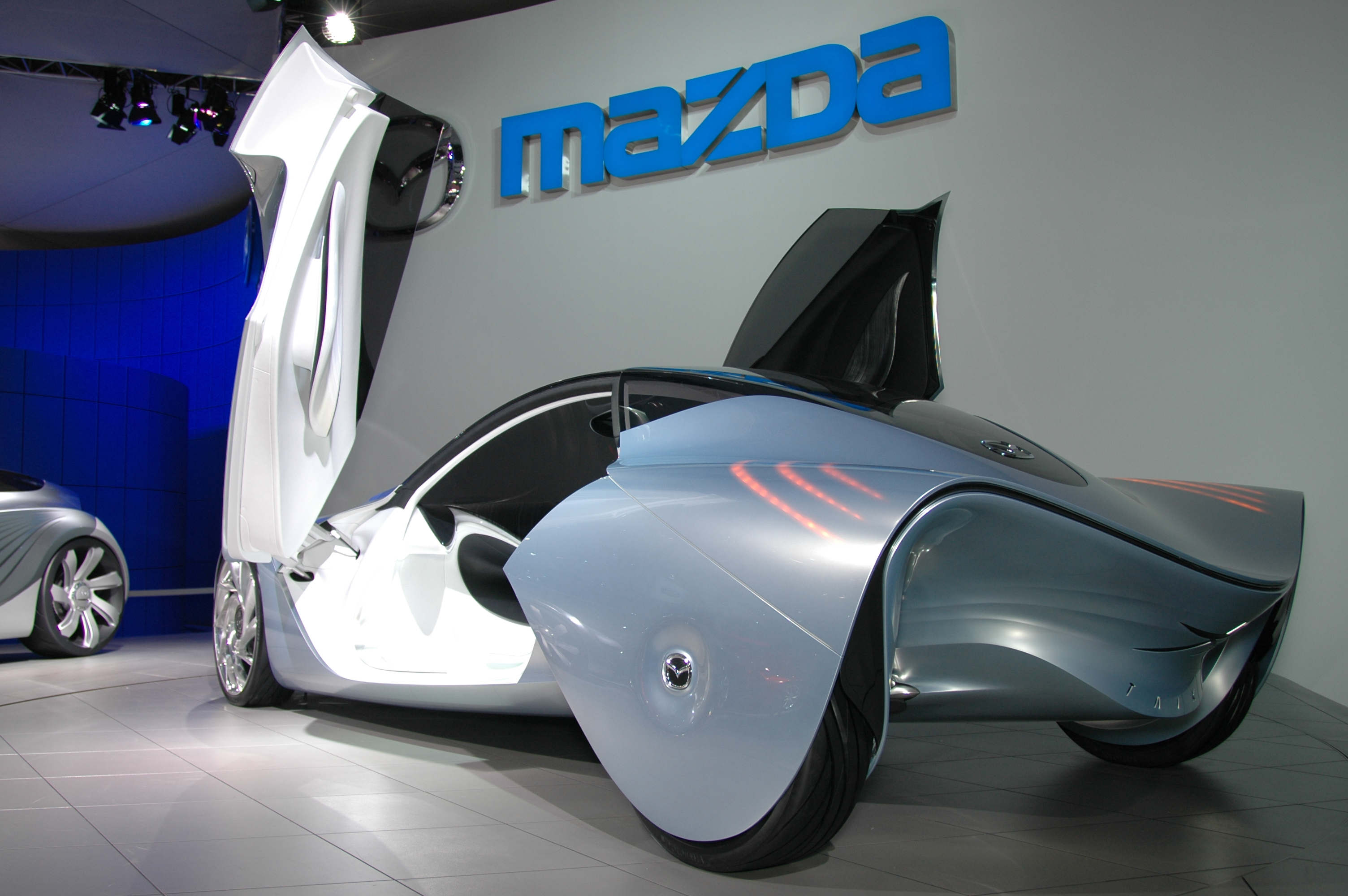
Rear view

The exterior design, created by Joseph Reeve under the direction of Atsuhiko Yamada, was inspired by flowing robes. The Taiki has butterfly doors and a very impressive drag coefficient of 0.25. Even the wheels and tires were designed with aerodynamics in mind.

==== Interior ====
The interior, designed by Troy Trinh, was influenced by 'koinobori' - Japanese carp streamers, and the black & white colour break was inspired by the symbol for Yin-Yang. The driver's side of the cabin was black, while the passenger side was white.
