= Nagaré =

Coordinates: 11°37′N 1°36′E

- Interactive map of Nagaré
- Country: Burkina Faso
- Region: Est Region
- Province: Gnagna Province
- Department: Bogandé Department

Population (2019)
  - Total: 7,773

Nagaré is a town in the Bogandé Department of Gnagna Province in eastern Burkina Faso.

Population
Year	Pop.	±%
1985	2,374	—
2006	3,711	+56.3%
2019	7,773	+109.5%
