= Mazda Hakaze =

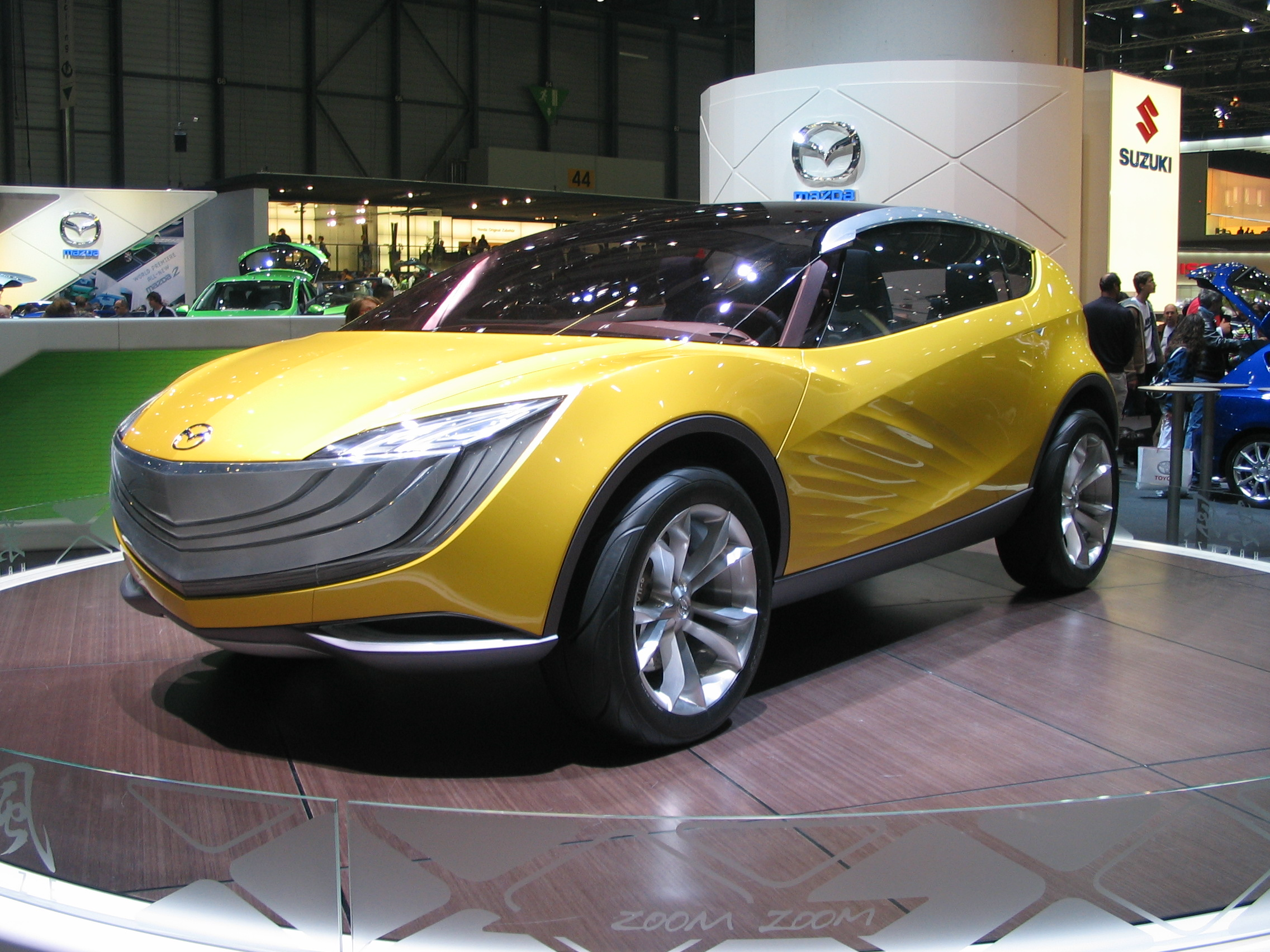

Overview
- Manufacturer: Mazda
- Production: 2007
- Designer: Laurens van den Acker; Peter Birtwhistle

Body and chassis
- Class: Crossover SUV
- Body style: 2-door coupe SUV
- Layout: All-wheel drive
- Doors: Scissor
- Related: Mazda Nagare; Mazda Ryuga; Mazda Taiki; Mazda Furai

Powertrain
- Engine: 2.3L MZR DISI turbo I4 (petrol)
- Transmission: 6-speed automatic (electronically controlled)

Dimensions
- Wheelbase: 2,650 mm (104.3 in)
- Length: 4,420 mm (174.0 in)
- Width: 1,890 mm (74.4 in)
- Height: 1,560 mm (61.4 in)

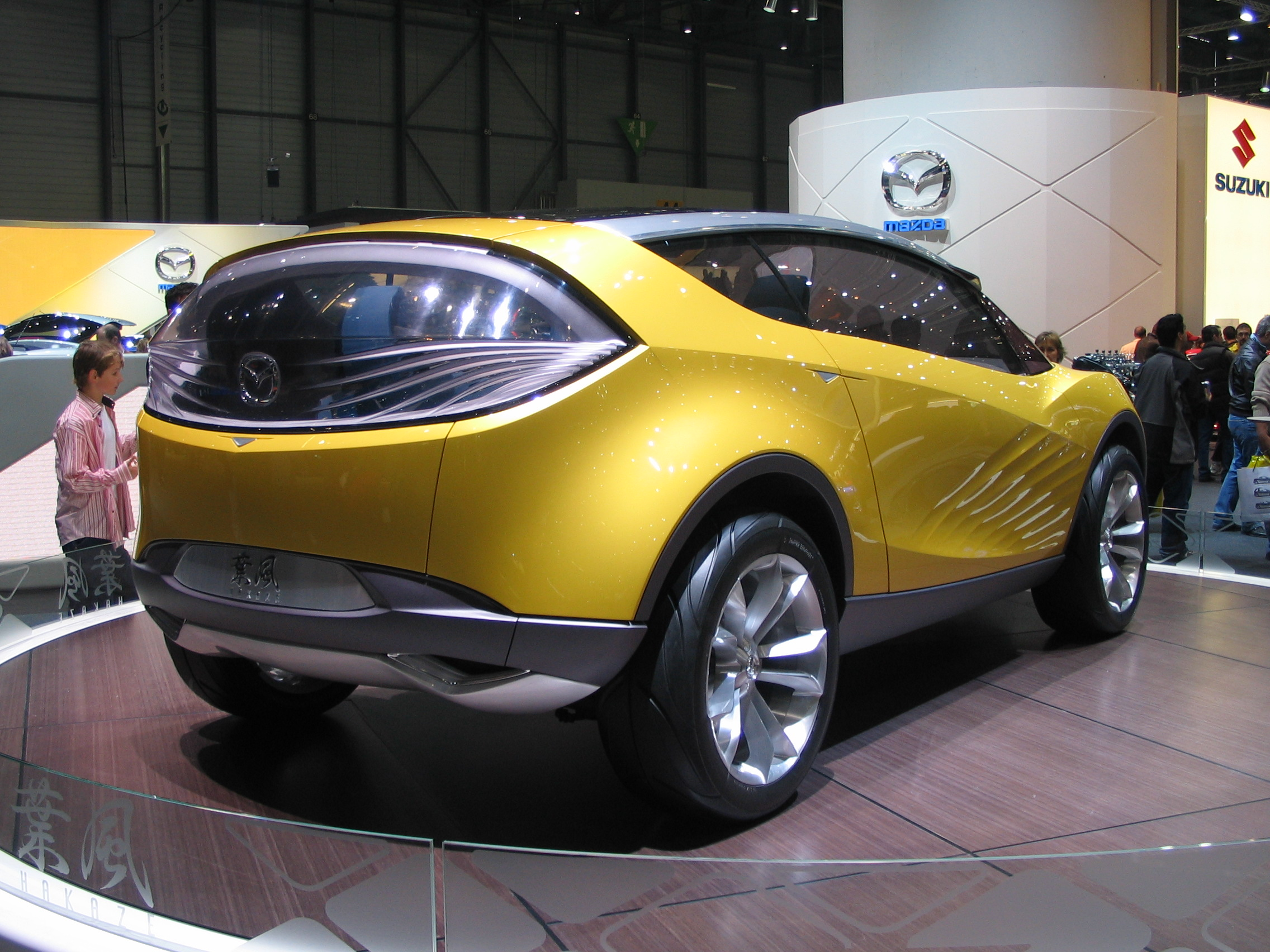
Rear view

The Mazda Hakaze (マツダ・葉風, Matsuda Hakaze) was a concept car that was revealed in early February 2007 by Japanese manufacturer Mazda. Its major design elements came from a new design language developed by Mazda called Nagare, designed by Laurens van den Acker, which also designed other Mazda concepts, and most notably the Renault Clio and Renault Captur. This element has been used on past Mazda concept cars such as: Mazda Nagare; Mazda Ryuga; Mazda Kabura.

== Niche ==
It was designed to have the looks of a coupe, the functionality of a Crossover SUV or CUV, while having the driving capabilities of a roadster.

== Features ==
The car had no door handles, cameras in place of mirrors, lighting effects, scissor doors, and a partially removable roof.

== Interior ==
Inside it had four bucket seats, making somewhat of a 2+2 format. There was a wrap-around center console. Everything inside could be adjusted to the driver's specific needs; once they were set the settings were stored in a Bluetooth card that the driver kept possession of. When the driver activated the car using the card, all of his/her personal preferences were automatically adjusted.
