= Laurens van den Acker =

Dutch automobile designer (born 1965)

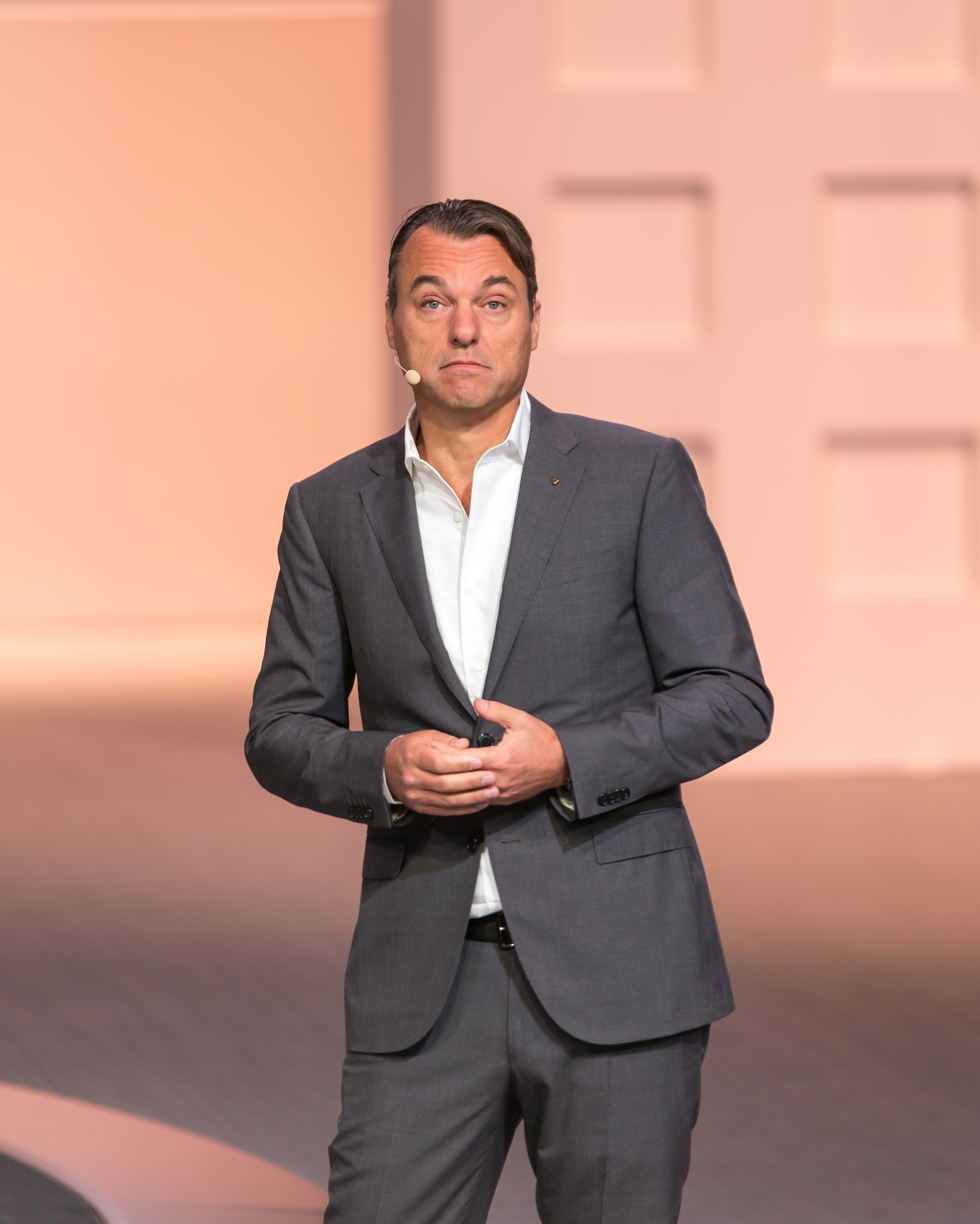
- Laurens van den Acker in 2018
- Born: 5 September 1965 (age 60); Deurne, North Brabant
- Occupation: Car designer

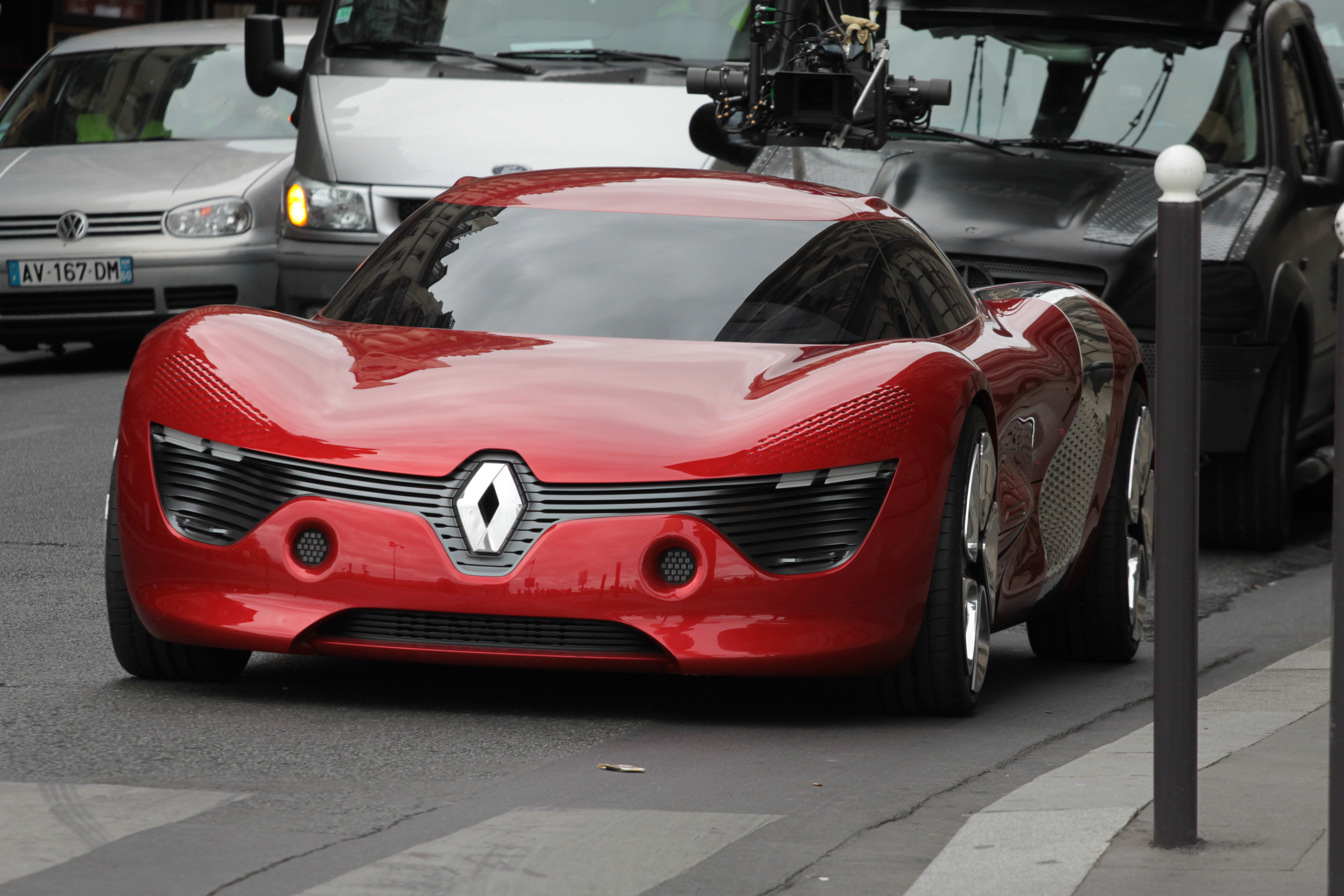
Renault Dezir Concept

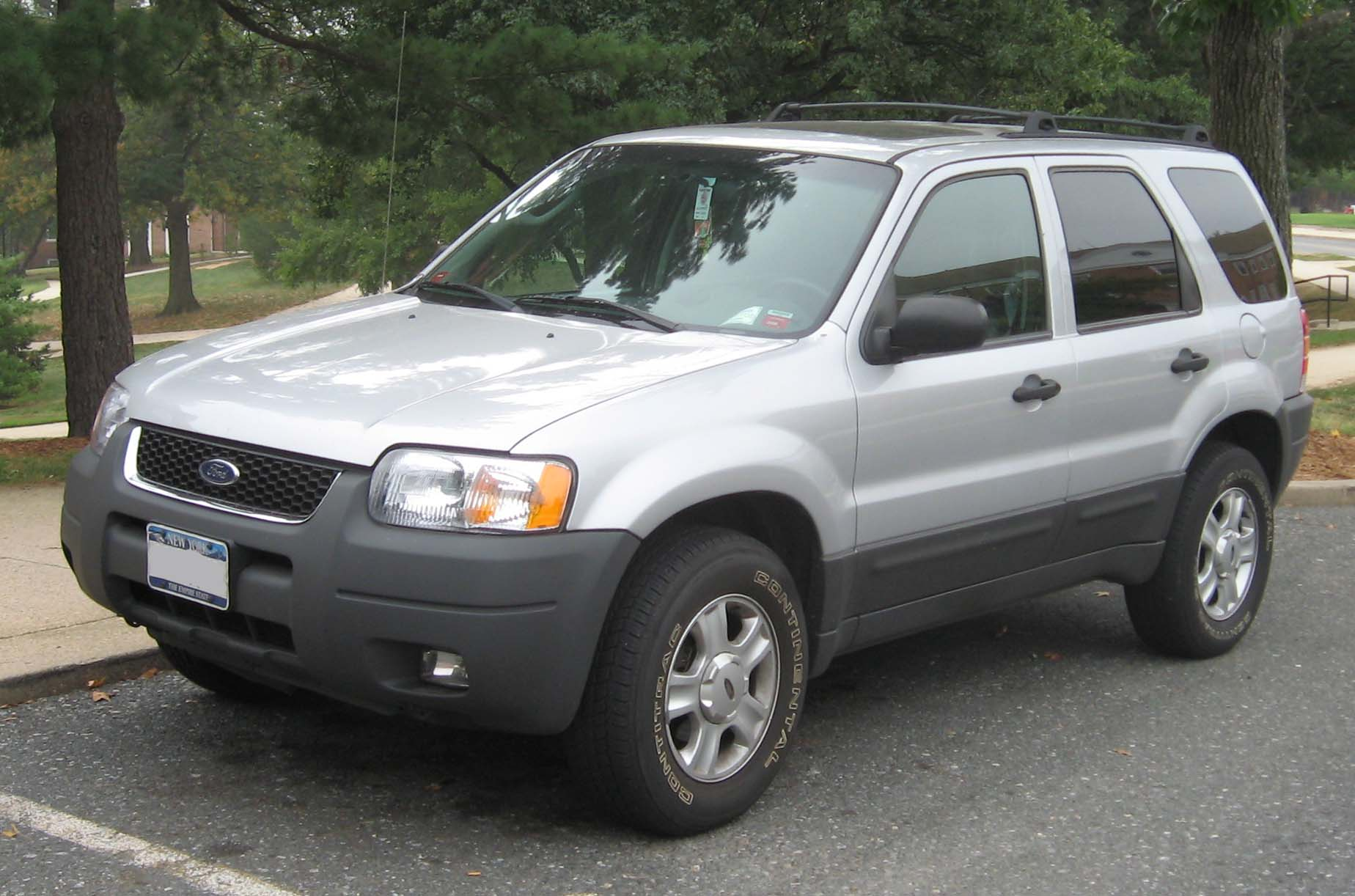
Ford Escape

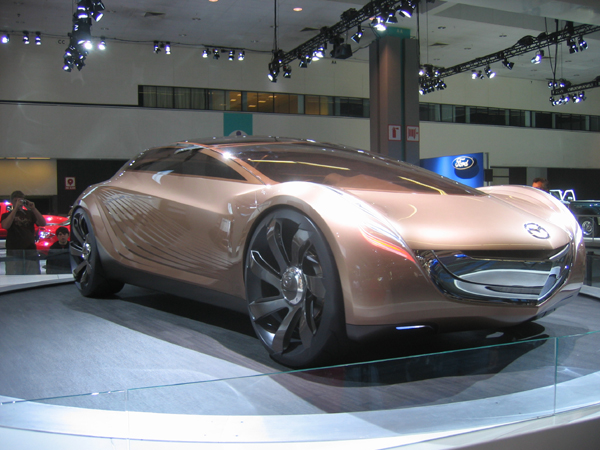
Mazda Nagare concept

Laurens van den Acker (born 5 September 1965, Deurne, North Brabant) is a Dutch automobile designer. He is the Chief Design Officer of the Renault Group.

== Biography ==
Van den Acker's father was an architect, which contributed to his passion for design.

He studied at the Delft University of Technology, where he obtained a Master of Engineering at the Faculty of Industrial Design Engineering. His internship was at Volvo Trucks in Ghent.

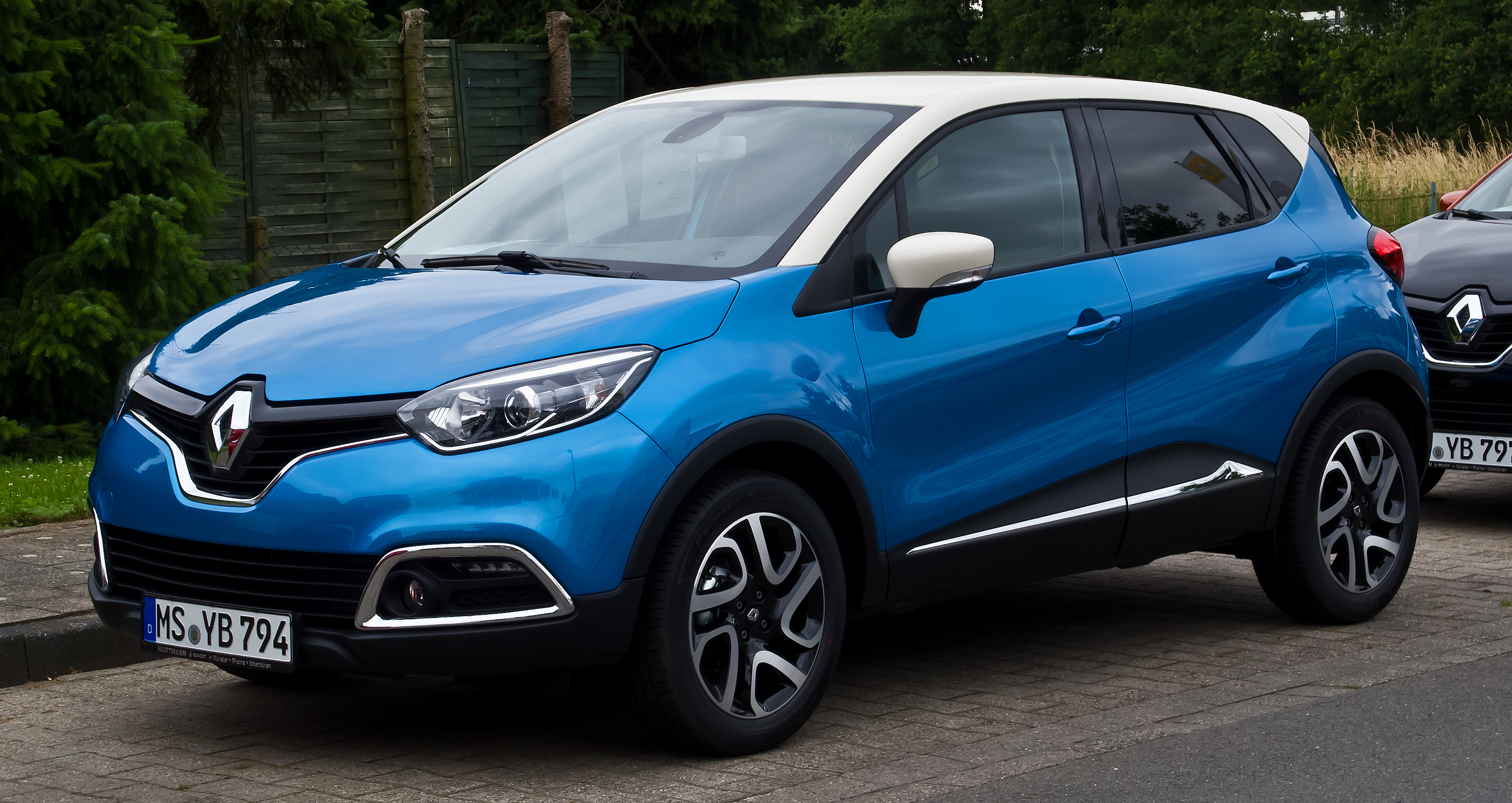
The Renault Captur is the best-selling crossover in Europe since its first commercialization month in 2013.

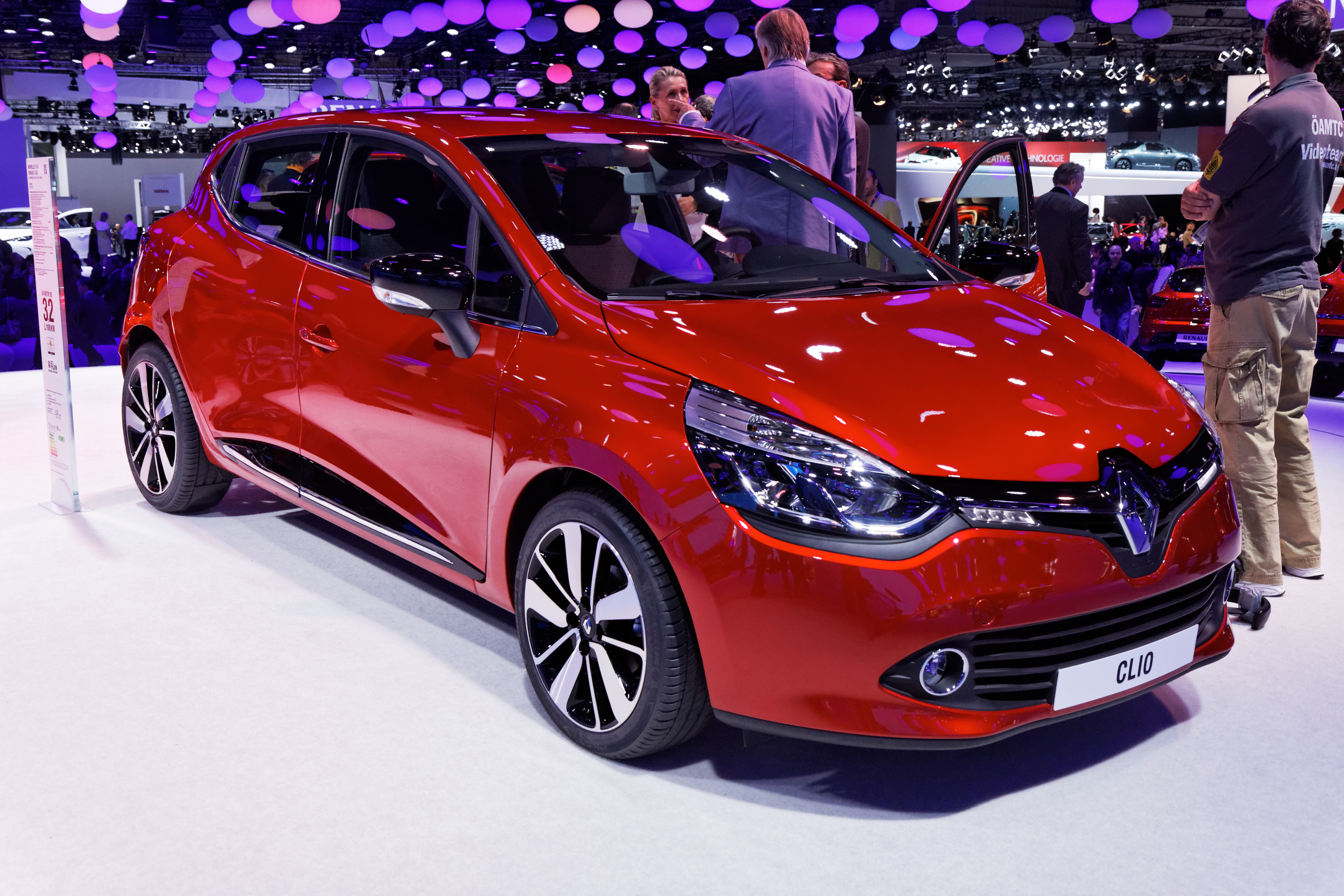
Renault Clio, 2012

=== Career ===
He began his career in 1990 as a designer at Design System srl in Turin, Italy, that worked on the interior of the Bugatti EB110 supercar.

In 1993, he moved to Audi as an Exterior Designer in the Ingolstadt Design Center in Germany, where he met J Mays. In 1996 he followed J Mays to SHR Perceptual Management in Newbury Park as a Senior Designer. Van den Acker joined Ford Motor Company, where J Mays had become vice-president of Design, in 1998. Late, he became chief designer of the Brand Imaging Group in Irvine, California. He was involved in designing Ford concepts such as the 427 (with Joe Baker), 021C (with Marc Newson), Concept U, and Ma; in 2003, he eventually became chief designer on Ford Escape in the Dearborn Design Center, Michigan (USA). In 2005, he became chief designer of Strategic Design of Ford.

In May 2006 he replaced Moray Callum as global head of design for Mazda. He was responsible for the Mazda concepts Nagare (Los Angeles 2006), Ryuga (Detroit 2007), and Hakaze (Geneva 2007).

He resigned from Mazda April 2009, and joined Renault on May 15, 2009. In September 2009, he became Senior Vice President of Renault Corporate Design to replace Patrick le Quément. He contributed to the design of Renault Twizy, as well as fourth-generation Renault Clio and the 2013 Renault Captur.

According to him, his fundamental statement for the new design line, which he presented to his approximately 500 employees at Renault Design, was the Renault DeZir concept car. The same team that developed the DeZir was responsible for revamping the Renault Clio compact car. The crossover Renault Captur and the Twingo microcar completed the revamping of the compact car segment. This was followed by the Renault Espace minivan and then the development of a new entry-level car for third world countries, the Renault Kwid, which was launched in India.

== Design work ==
- Bugatti vehicles:
  - Bugatti Chiron
  - Bugatti EB110
- Ford vehicles:
  - Ford 24/7 (concept)
  - Ford 427 by Joe Baker
  - Ford Escape
  - Ford GloCar (concept)
  - Ford Model U (concept)
- Mercury vehicles:
  - Mercury Mariner
- Mazda vehicles:
  - Mazda 3 (2009)
  - Mazda Hakaze (concept)
  - Mazda Kiyora (concept)
  - Mazda Nagare (concept)
  - Mazda Ryuga (concept)
  - Mazda Furai (concept)
- Renault vehicles:
  - Renault Arkana (2019)
  - Renault Captur (concept)
  - Renault Clio IV (2012)
  - Renault DeZir (concept)
  - Renault Espace V
  - Renault Talisman
  - Renault Twizy

== Others ==
Richard Blackburn wrote in an article in Sydney Morning Herald that van den Acker 'still has some of the sketches' of cars 'he penned as a five-year-old, with smoke bellowing from exhausts and cartoon-like lines depicting the wind. He keeps them because they "capture the emotion of motion". In layman's terms that means creating forms and surfaces that look as if they're moving when they're standing still.'

== Personal life ==
Van den Acker is married to designer Pieternel Kroes and has a daughter.

His first car was a Volvo 1800 ES. He cited Italian car designer Marcello Gandini as one of his role models. His dream cars are the Alfa Romeo BAT cars.
