= Mazda Furai =

Concept car by Mazda

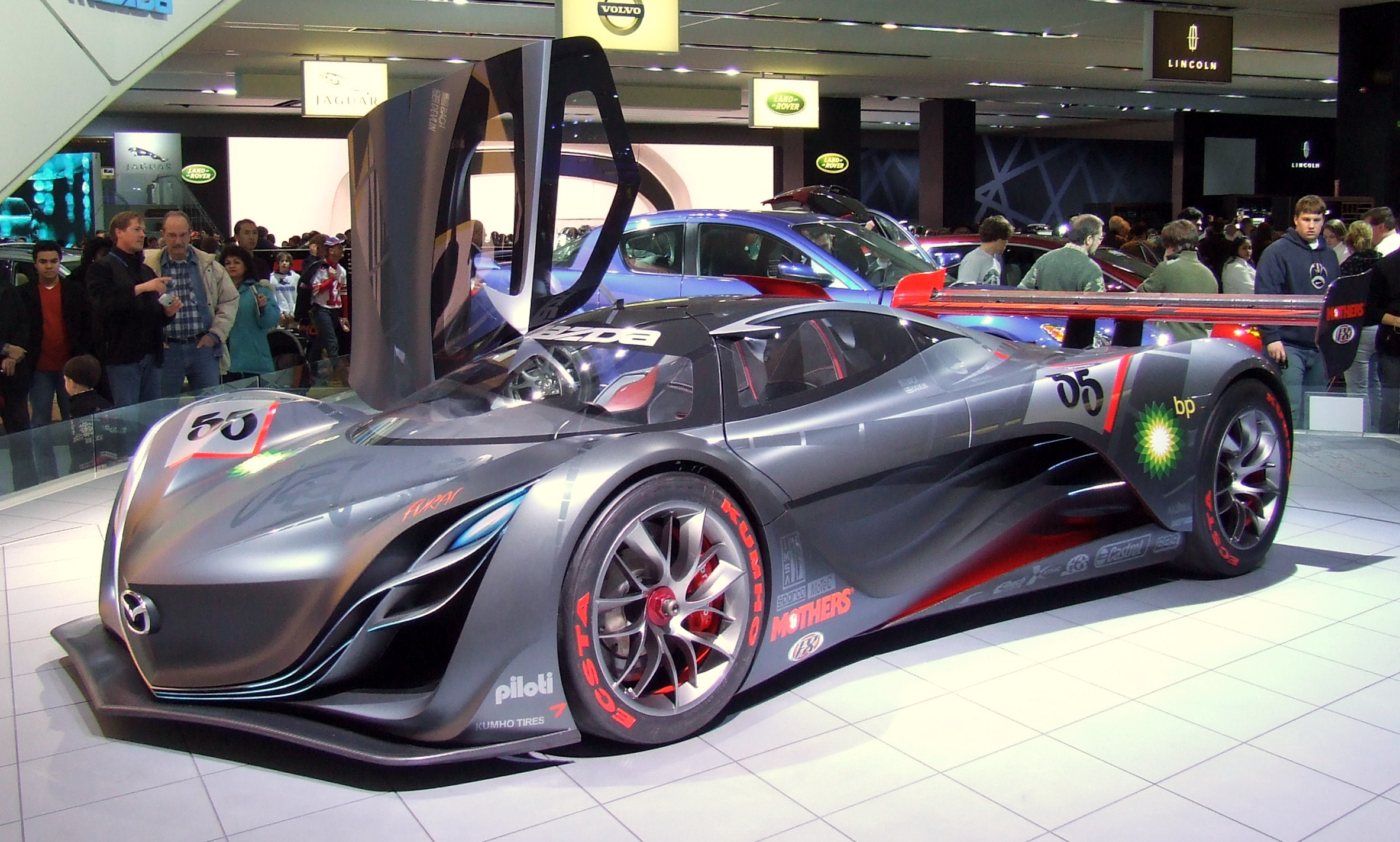
- The Furai on display during the 2008 Detroit Auto Show.

Overview
- Manufacturer: Mazda
- Designer: Swift Engineering with Mazda's design studio, Southern California

Body and chassis
- Class: Concept car
- Body style: 2-door coupé
- Layout: MR layout
- Platform: Courage C65 LMP2
- Doors: Butterfly
- Related: Mazda Nagare; Mazda Ryuga; Mazda Hakaze; Mazda Taiki

Powertrain
- Engine: 2.0 L (122 cu in) 450 hp (336 kW) R20B RENESIS 3-rotor
- Transmission: Xtrac 6-speed semi-automatic

Dimensions
- Wheelbase: 2,790 mm (109.8 in)
- Length: 4,563 mm (179.6 in)
- Width: 1,956 mm (77.0 in)
- Height: 977 mm (38.5 in)
- Curb weight: 675 kg (1,488 lb)

Chronology
- Predecessor: Mazda Nagare

The Mazda Furai (マツダ・風籟, Matsuda Fūrai) was a concept car revealed on December 27, 2007, and designed by Swift Engineering and manufactured by Mazda. A teaser image of the vehicle was released on December 11, 2007. The Furai officially debuted at the 2008 North American International Auto Show in Detroit, Michigan.

== Overview ==
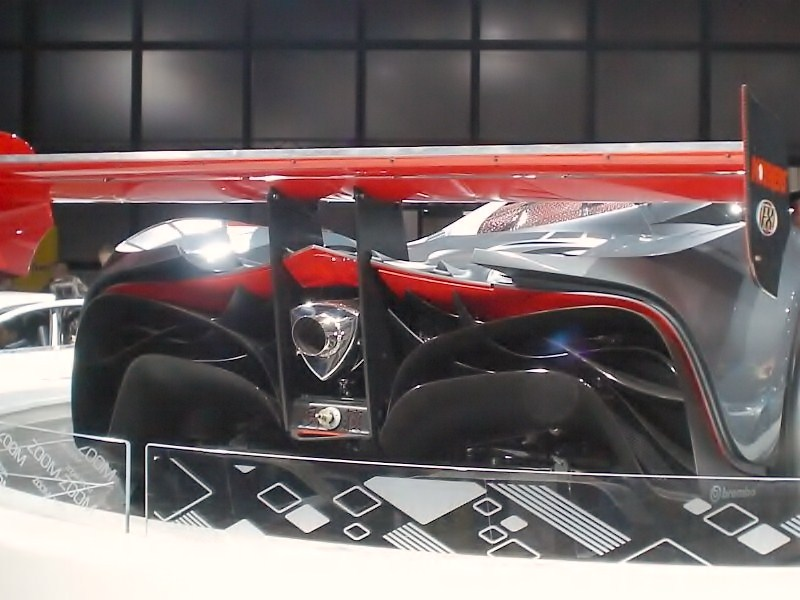
Wing and exhaust in detail from the Mazda Furai on display at the 2008 Canadian International Auto Show

The Furai, meaning "sound of the wind", was the fifth and last of the Nagare line of concept cars that have been made by Mazda since 2006. The chassis was based on the Courage Compétition C65 Le Mans Prototype that Mazda last used to compete in the American Le Mans Series, two seasons previously and was designed to use E100 ethanol fuel, it was powered by a heavily modified 20B 3-rotor wankel engine that produces 336 kW; 456 PS (450 bhp). The engine was developed and built by renowned rotary tuner, Racing Beat, who also built the car's rotary-shaped muffler canister.

The car wore the number 55, that of its 1991 24 Hours of Le Mans-winning ancestor, the 787B. Unlike many concept cars, the Furai was fully functional and was tested at various tracks. It ran at Laguna Seca and Buttonwillow.

The head designer, Laurens van den Acker, stated in an interview with Top Gear magazine that there would have been possibilities of the Furai being used for racing in Le Mans, and he also had strong hopes that the car could be brought to the market.

== Appearances ==
The Furai appears as a playable vehicle in various video games such as Real Racing 3, Gran Turismo, Forza Motorsport and Forza Horizon, CSR Racing, Grid, Asphalt, and GT Racing. Additionally, a die-cast toy of the car has been made by Mattel via its Hot Wheels brand.

== 2008 accident ==
In September 2013, it was revealed that the car had been destroyed by fire during road tests by Top Gear in 2008.

On November 29, 2013, Top Gear was given the opportunity to make the story about the Furai's demise public. It was explained that the vehicle caught fire during a photography session at Bentwaters Parks on August 19, 2008, at 11:52 am. Driver Mark Ticehurst was piloting the Furai when the engine bay caught fire while cresting a hill on the backside of the track. Ticehurst was able to escape the car before the fire spread to the cabin area. Due to the location of the accident, fire crews were initially unaware of the incident, and took several minutes to reach the Furai. By this time, the car was completely engulfed in flames. The fire took approximately eight minutes to extinguish, and the Furai was incinerated as a result. Although the car's remains were initially taken to Mazda's Advanced Design Studio in Irvine, California, the ultimate fate of the Furai's charred remains is not publicly known.
