= Mazda Ryuga =

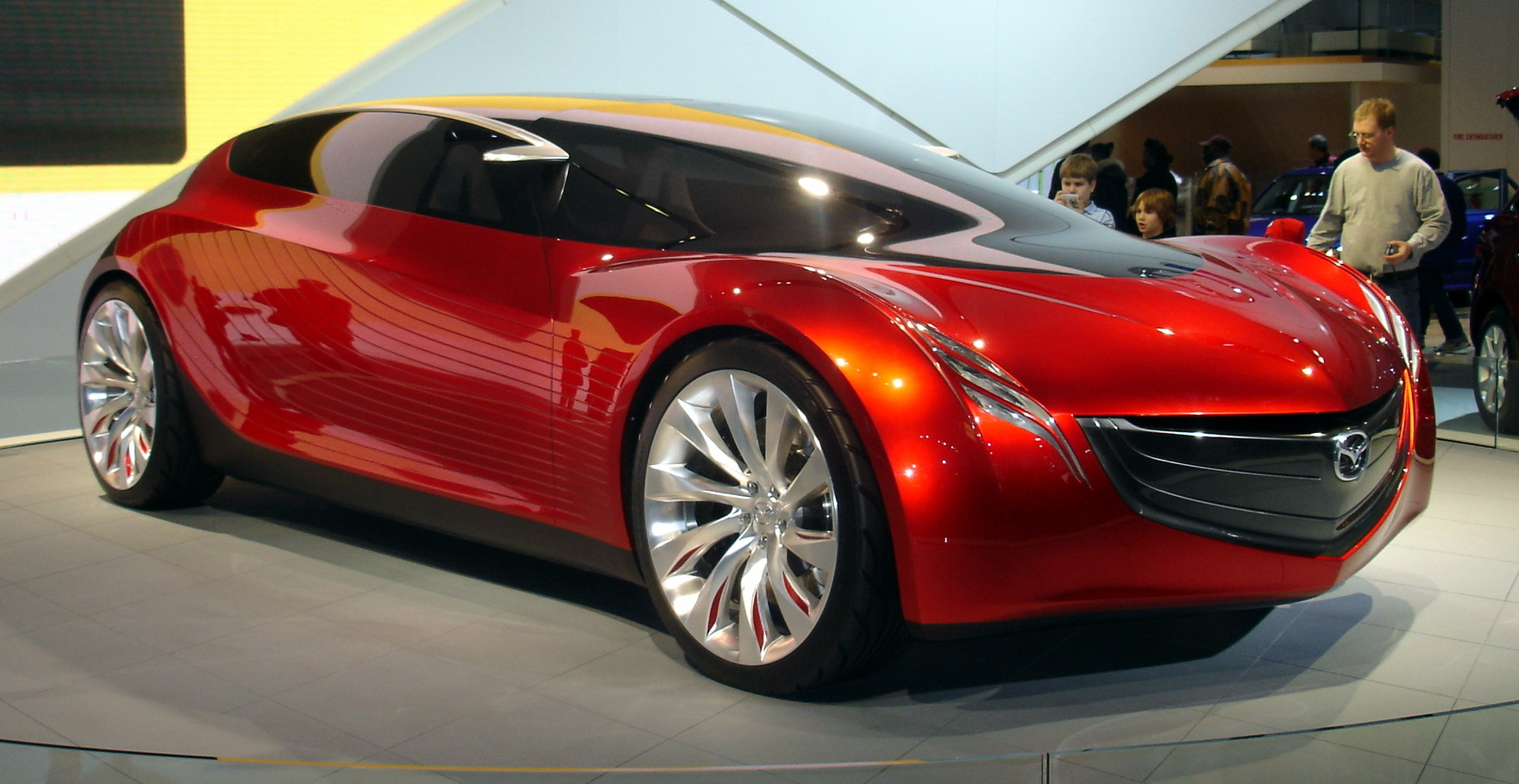

Overview
- Manufacturer: Mazda
- Production: 2007
- Designer: Laurens van den Acker

Body and chassis
- Class: Concept car
- Body style: 2-door coupé
- Layout: FF layout
- Doors: Gullwing doors
- Related: Mazda Nagare; Mazda Taiki; Mazda Hakaze; Mazda Furai

Powertrain
- Engine: MZR 2.5 L E85 flex fuel
- Transmission: six-speed automatic

Dimensions
- Wheelbase: 2800 mm (110.2 in)
- Length: 4280 mm (168.5 in)
- Width: 1900 mm (74.8 in)\
- Height: 1260 mm (49.6 in)

The Mazda Ryuga (マツダ・流雅, Matsuda Ryūga) was a concept car introduced by Mazda and partner Ford at the 2007 North American International Auto Show in Detroit, Michigan. The car, along with the Mazda Nagare which was introduced at the Greater Los Angeles Auto Show, was an exploratory design study intended to illustrate future styling directions for future Mazda passenger vehicles. The Ryuga moniker (pronounced "ree-yoo-ga") is Japanese for "gracious flow".

== Exterior ==
The large 21" wheels were placed at the far corners for a stable, balanced stance. The body featured two gull-wing doors, and was significantly shorter and lower than the four-passenger Mazda RX-8 sports car.

== Interior ==
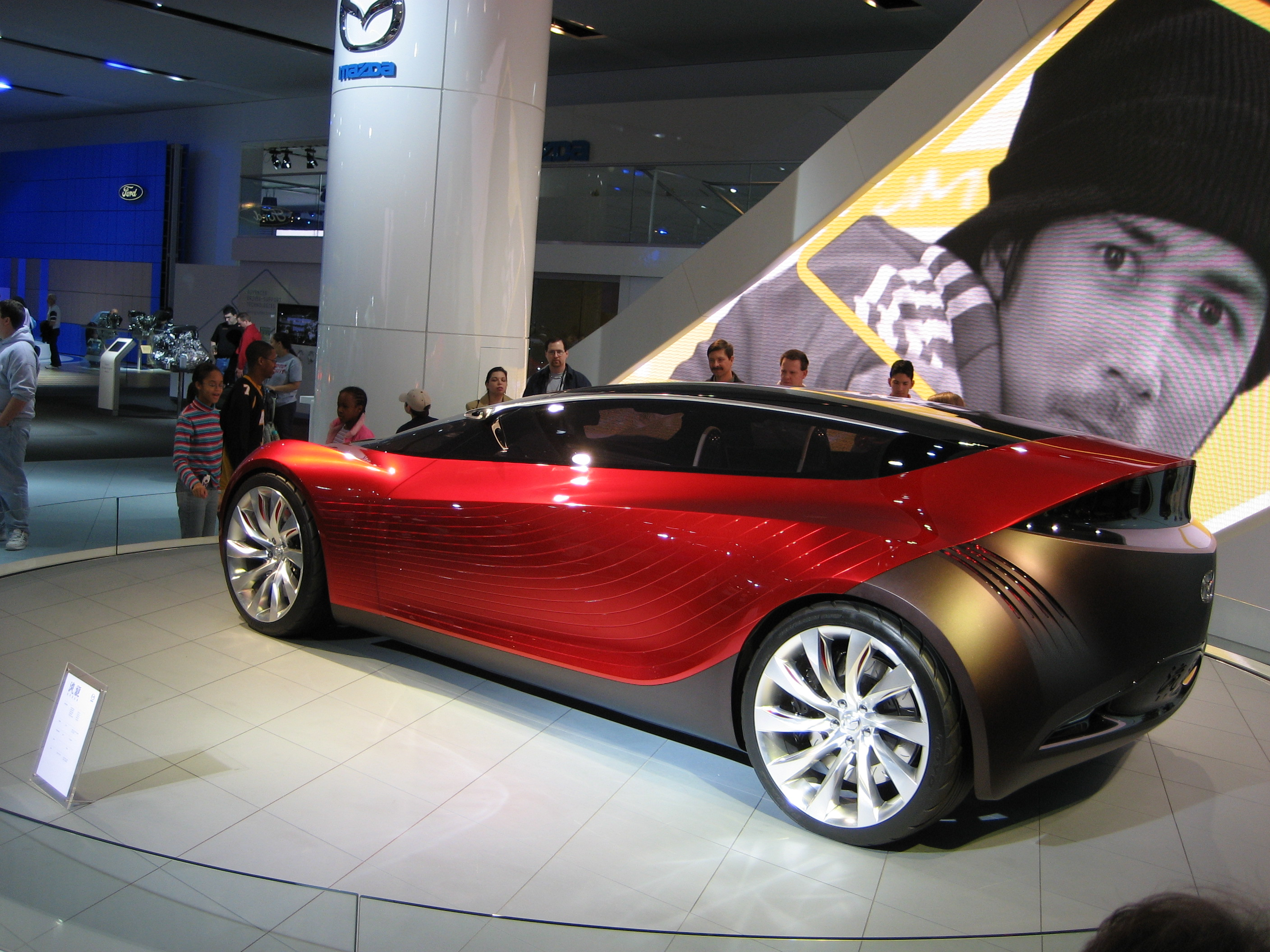
Rear view

The Ryuga accommodated four passengers in typical 2+2 seating, with front bucket seats and a lounge-like rear passenger area. A "floating" center cluster with elongated pods included a multi-function touch panel for controls and displays. A set of charge-coupled device (CCD) cameras were installed for monitoring the rearward view and blind-spot. The steering wheel was an open top style, which utilized steer-by-wire technology.

== Performance ==
The Ryuga was powered with an E85 / gasoline flex fuel engine.

== Specifications ==
- Engine: MZR 2.5 L E85/gasoline Flex Fuel
- Transmission: 6 -speed automatic
- Drive: front-wheel drive
- Wheels: 21"
- Tires (Front/Rear) 245/35 R21 (93W) Toyo Proxes
