= Mazda Nagare =

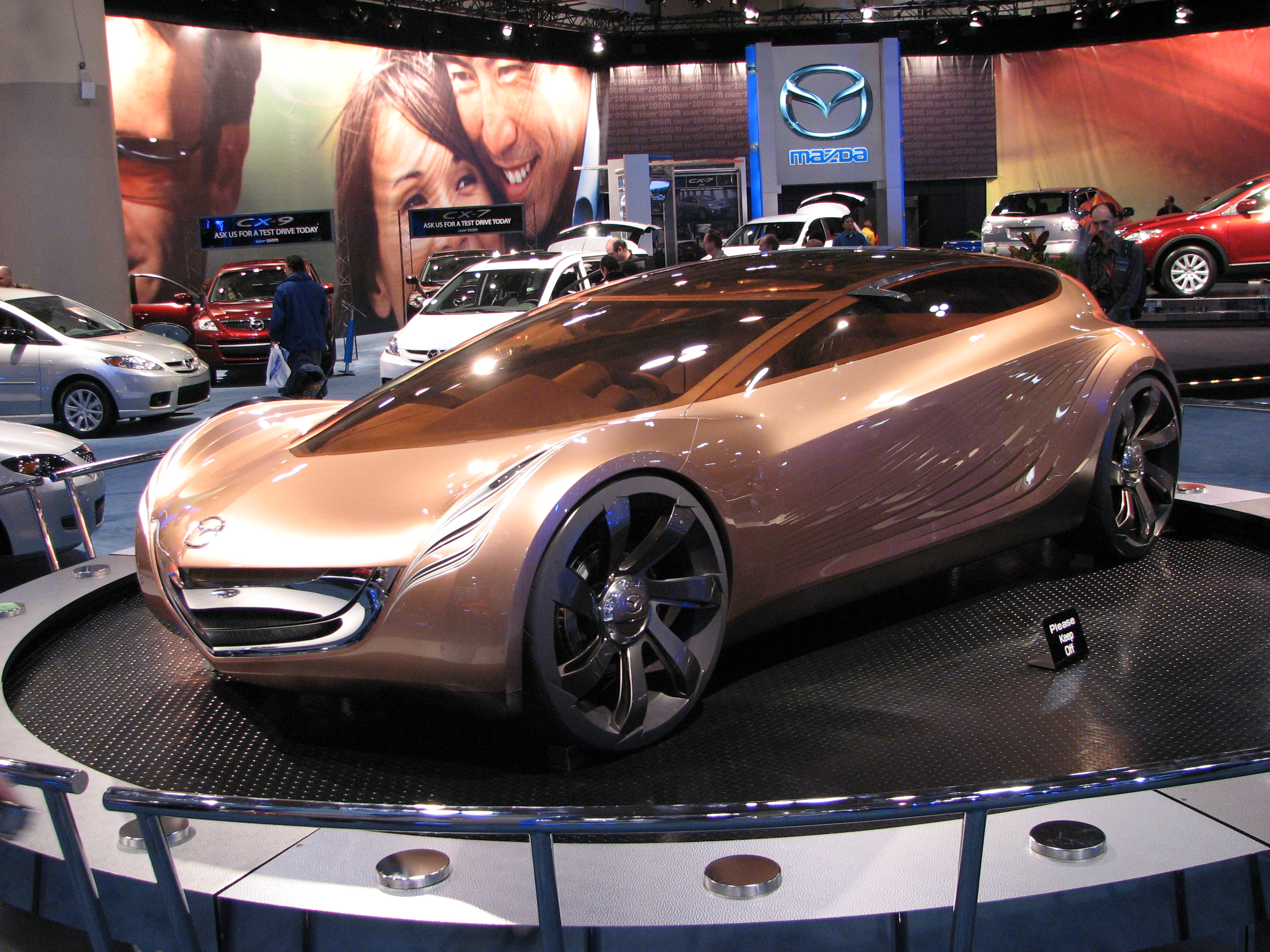

Overview
- Manufacturer: Mazda
- Production: 2006
- Designer: Laurens van den Acker

Body and chassis
- Class: Concept car
- Body style: 2-door coupe
- Related: Mazda Taiki; Mazda Ryuga; Mazda Hakaze; Mazda Furai

Powertrain
- Engine: Rumored hydrogen-fueled rotary engine

Chronology
- Successor: Mazda Furai

The Mazda Nagare (マツダ・流, Matsuda Nagare) (pronounced "nah-gah-reh") was a concept car that was introduced by Mazda at the 2006 Los Angeles Auto Show. The Nagare was considered to be an exercise in natural and organic car design to explore the future of Mazda automobiles. Its name "Nagare" translates into English as "flow" and the designers specifically studied motion and the effect it has on natural surroundings when creating this vehicle.

It was designed by Laurens van den Acker, Mazda's global design director at the time (since replaced by Ikuo Maeda), and his advanced design studio team in Irvine, California. As head of the international Nagare design team, Laurens' main task from Mazda was to design first and engineering later.

"The Nagare is a celebration of proportions and surface language that will evolve into subsequent designs planned for presentation at future international auto shows. Nagare examines light and shadow, and begins to reveal the global design cues for the next generation of Mazda vehicles," said Laurens. "We're looking well down the road with Nagare. We want to suggest where Mazda design will be in 2020. To do that, we redefined basic proportions and the idea of driving without losing the emotional involvement. Mazda's driving spirit will be enhanced and intensified by Nagare."

== Design ==
The Mazda Nagare was a celebration of proportions and surface language according to its designers. Its bodylines flowed like liquid across its smooth seamless design and there were no distinguishing marks that detracted from the overall theme of the car. It had a large windshield that raked at a very steep angle molding itself into the glass roof of the car. Its large and aggressive wheels were wrapped into the wheel wells, incorporating them as a part of the body.

Two double-length doors hinged forward when opened and spread from the cabin like the wings of a butterfly. Inside, you could find the driver's seat centrally located in the front of the cabin and three passenger rear seats arranged in a "wrap-around lounge" in the back. The interior continued the Nagare's organic themes with futuristic elliptical controls and dials relating information to the driver.

Mazda aimed to maintain the soul of a sports car with the design of the Nagare. The body work was designed with both form and function in mind, aiming to decrease drag. The wheels of the Nagare were also positioned at the far corners of the envelope for quick steering response and agile maneuverability.

== Engine ==
Powertrain details were largely speculated at the time. Mazda has never released any information on the specifics of the engine and its performance because they wanted to focus on the design elements of the car.

== Gallery ==
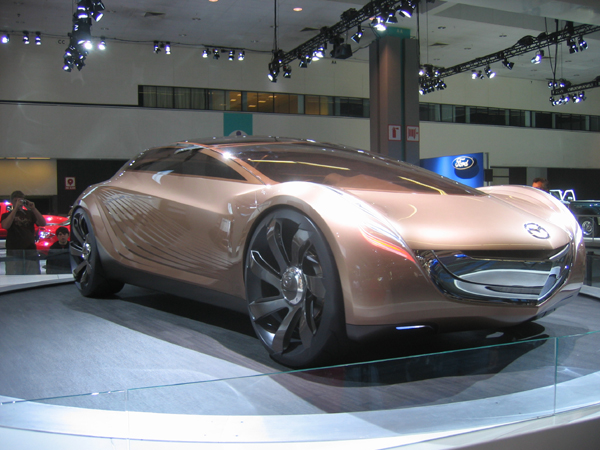
2006 Los Angeles International Auto Show

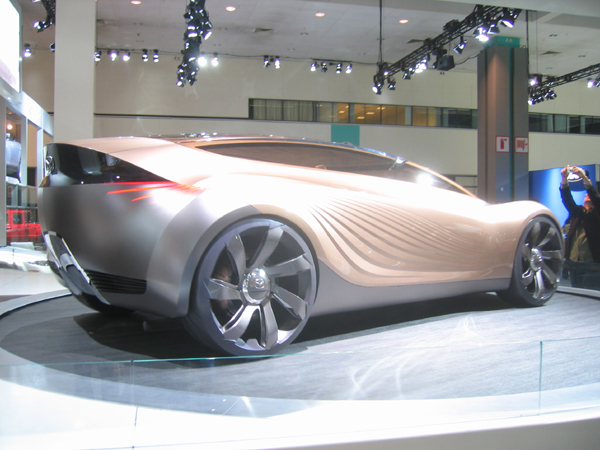
Rear view
