= Mazda Bongo =

Light commercial vehicle manufactured by Mazda

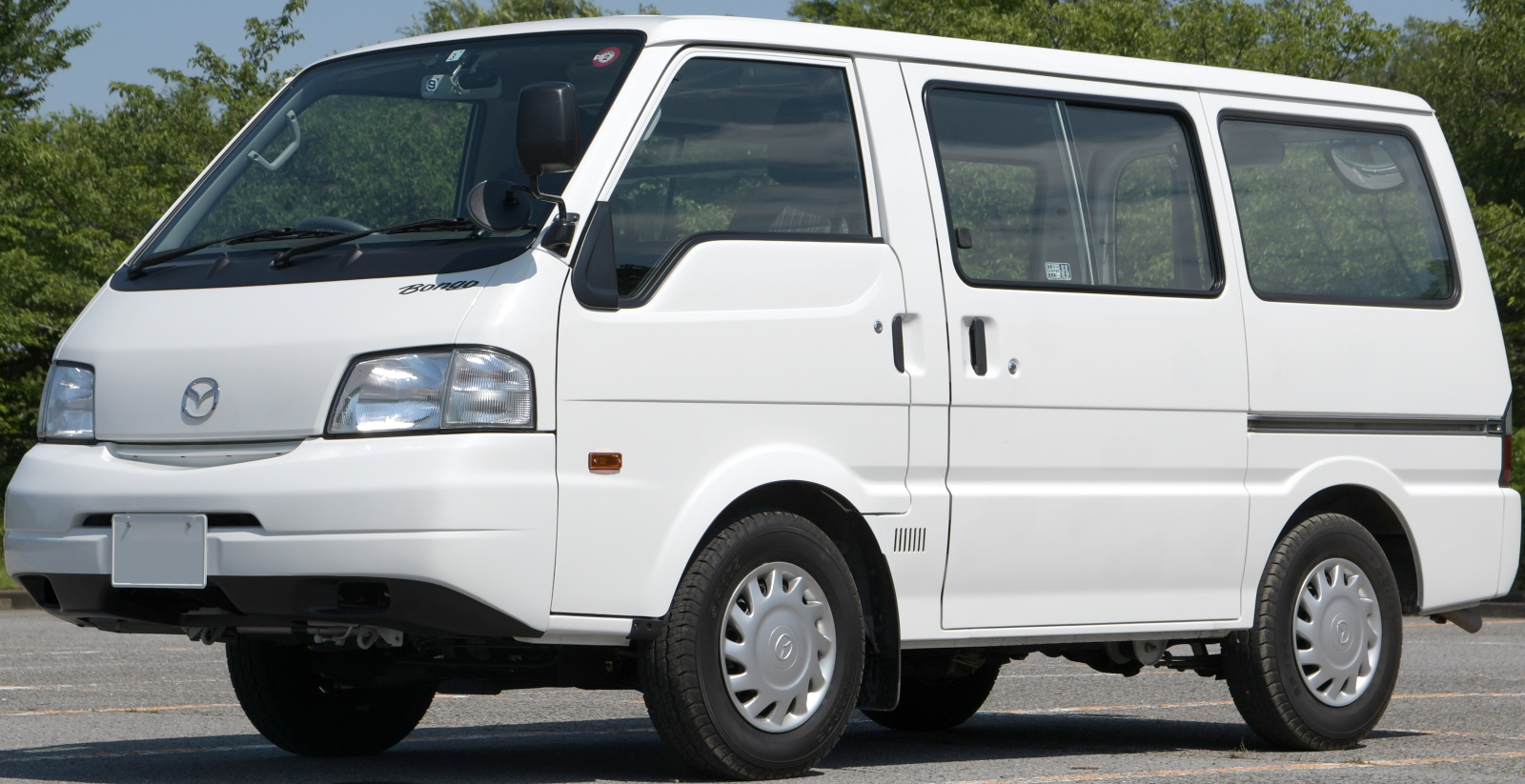
- Fourth-generation Mazda Bongo Van DX (SLP2V) with dual sliding door

Overview
- Manufacturer: Mazda (1966–2020); Toyota/Daihatsu (2019–present)
- Also called: Mazda E-Series; Mazda Traveller; Mazda Marathon; Eunos Cargo; Ford Econovan; Ford Freda; Ford Spectron; Nissan Vanette Van/Truck (third/fourth generation); Mitsubishi Delica and Mitsubishi Delica Cargo (fourth generation); Daihatsu Gran Max/Toyota TownAce/LiteAce (fifth generation, S400); Toyota HiAce (fifth generation, H200 Bongo Brawny)
- Production: 1966–present
- Assembly: Japan: Hiroshima (Hiroshima plant, 1966–2020); Inabe, Mie (Toyota Auto Body, H200 Bongo Brawny); Indonesia: Bekasi, West Java (National Assemblers, 1996–2005); Sunter, North Jakarta (Astra Daihatsu Motor, 2020–present); Malaysia: Shah Alam; Philippines: Parañaque (Columbian Autocar Corporation); Taiwan: Taoyuan (Chungli Plant); Zimbabwe: Willowvale (WMMI)

Body and chassis
- Class: Light commercial vehicle
- Body style: Van; Pickup truck
- Layout: Rear-engine, rear-wheel-drive (1966–1975); Front mid-engine, rear-wheel-drive (1977–present); Front mid-engine, four-wheel-drive (1983–present)
- Related: Kia Bongo

The Mazda Bongo (Japanese: マツダ・ボンゴ, Hepburn: Matsuda Bongo), also known as the Ford Econovan and Eunos Cargo, is a cabover van and pickup truck manufactured by the Japanese automobile manufacturer Mazda since 1966. The Bongo name was also used for the Bongo Friendee, which is not a cabover design.

It has been built with rear-, middle-, as well as front-mounted engines. It also formed the basis for the long-running Kia Bongo range. It is named for the African Bongo, a type of antelope.

== First generation (1966–1975) ==

First generation Mazda Bongo

Mazda first introduced its small van, the Bongo, in May 1966. It featured a rear-mounted 782 cc water-cooled OHV SA 4-stroke engine driving the rear wheels. The rear-engined Bongo was produced in two versions from 1968, as the F800 was joined by the bigger-engined F1000. This has a 987 cc PB overhead valve inline-four engine with 48 PS (35 kW) at 5500 rpm. The chassis code for the 1-litre model is FPA. Its dimensions were 3,770 mm (148 in) long, 1,500 mm (59 in) wide, 1,700 mm (67 in) height, with a wheelbase of 2,000 mm (79 in), and Vehicle weight of 885 kg (1,951 lb) (commercial delivery van) 910 kg (2,006 lb) (passenger coach), and 775 kg (1,709 lb) (cab-over truck). Mazda also showed an electrically powered version of the van, which could reach 75 km/h (47 mph), and with a 60 km (37 mi) range. but wasn't put into production, and remained a prototype. The engines were shared with Mazda's Familia small car range. Production ended in 1975, due to Mazda suffering serious economic troubles, and upcoming stricter emissions regulations for 1976, influenced by the original United States Federal Clean Air Act of 1963. This model retained the same body shape for its 10-year production life, the later models fitted with inertia-reel seat belts, and separate front parking indicator lights.

The rear-engined Bongos had a full chassis (using the same Mazda 1000 engine as other variants mounted to a four-speed transaxle at the rear), and were very strong, and due to the low gearing, able to carry half a ton. Due to rust and poor maintenance, these Bongos are now rare. The 1000 pickup which was built for commercial uses, and the cargo and passenger vans all used a double wishbone and coil spring suspension for the front wheels, and a trailing-arm suspension and coil springs at the rear wheels.

Due to the popularity of the Bongo, Mazda decided to manufacture a minibus, called the Mazda Parkway starting in 1974 until 1997, shared with the larger Mazda Titan truck platform.

== Second generation (1977–1983) ==
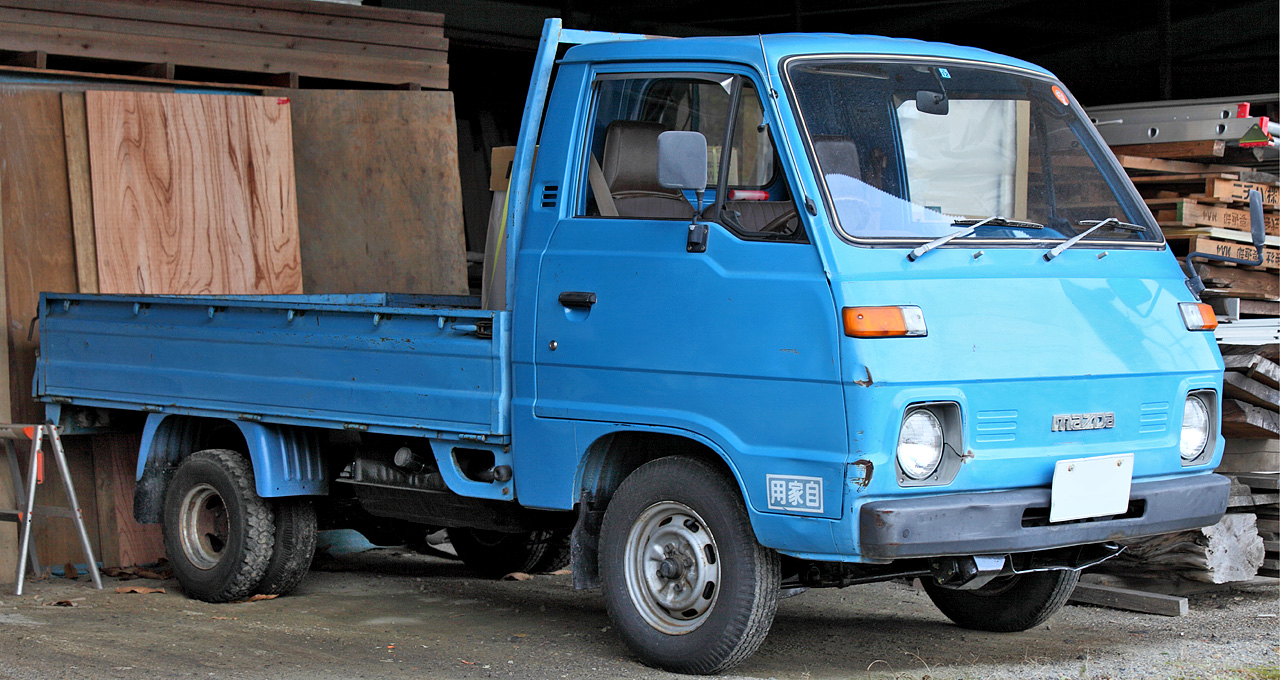
Second generation Mazda Bongo (pre-facelift)

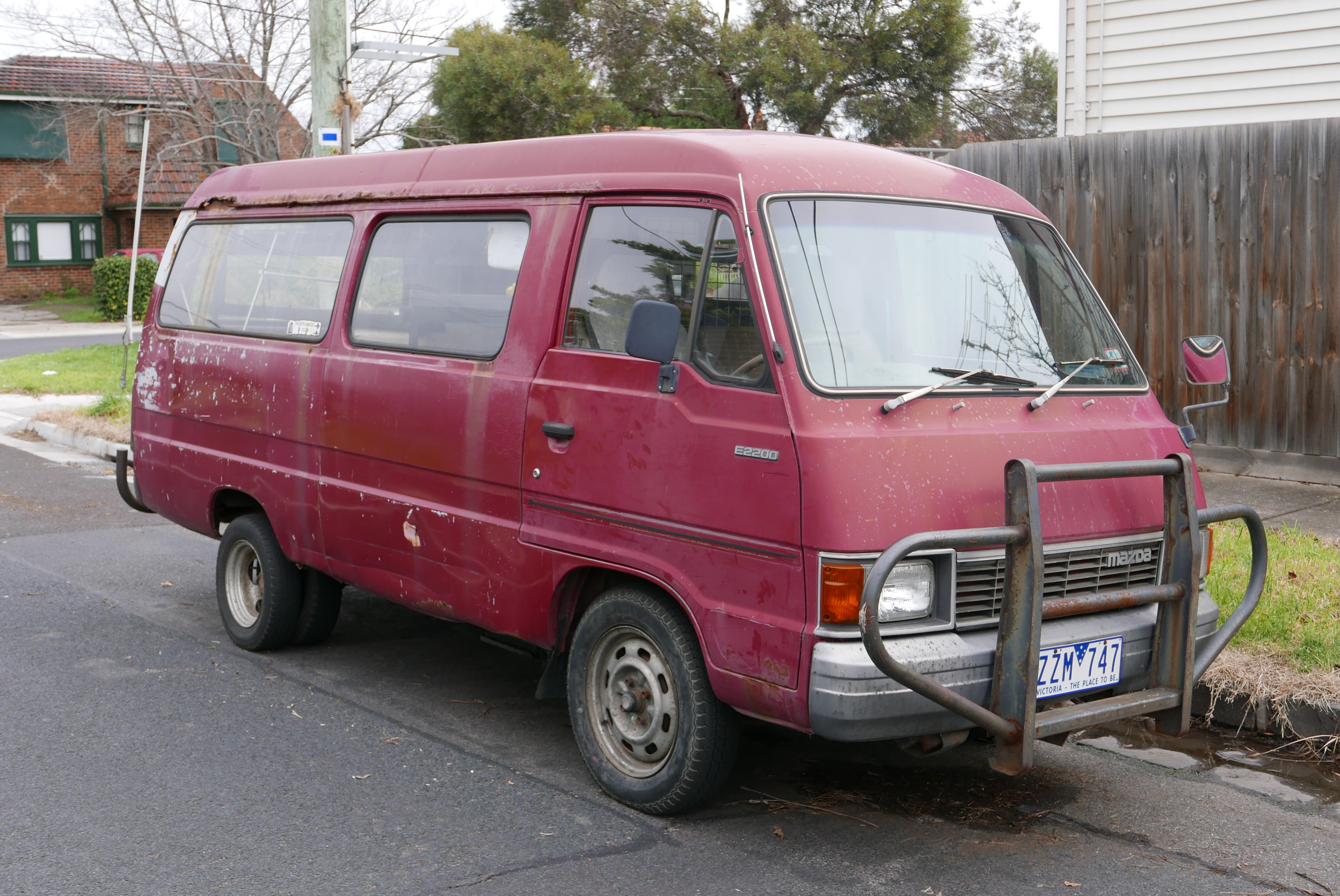
Second generation Mazda E2200 (facelift)

After a two-year hiatus, the next Bongo van appeared in September 1977. It was a mid-engine rear wheel drive vehicle. Ford sold this version of the van as the Ford Econovan, while Mazda sold it for export as the E1300, E1400, and E1600, depending on engine size. Beginning in October 1979 a 2.2-litre diesel engine was also available in commercial versions, sold in export as the E2200. This appeared in the passenger version "Bongo Multi Wagon" in February 1980. The Bongo Multi Wagon had originally been sold with a 1.8-liter petrol engine only. This model went on sale in Great Britain in 1982 as the E1600, only a year before it was replaced by the next generation. The British market only received the long wheelbase 1-tonne panel van version with small, twinned rear wheels, and a five-speed manual gearbox with a column-mounted shifter.

This generation was also manufactured by Kia in South Korea, as the Kia Bongo and Ceres. The Bongo/Ceres underwent a number of facelifts, and was still available as late as 1999.

The original version has round headlights, and no grille; after a January 1981 facelift the second generation Bongo/E-series had rectangular headlights, and a more traditional grille. The first generation of the Bongo was the best-selling Mazda vehicle from its introduction until 1981, when it was surpassed by the front-wheel drive Mazda Familia.

In Australia, rebadged versions were sold as the Ford Econovan as a SWB petrol van (with and without side windows), LWB petrol van (with and without side windows), and LWB diesel van guises (windowless). SWB and LWB window petrol vans also sold in passenger-carrying Ford Econowagon form. Luxury-oriented passenger models were sold under the Ford Spectron name as high-roof eight-seaters. The Spectron name was also introduced for the Japanese market in 1981, on the facelifted version of the second generation Bongo.

=== Engines ===
- 1977–October 1979 1,272 cc TC, 60 PS (44 kW) / 77 PS (57 kW) JIS (Japan) – BA2T8
- 1977–1983 1,586 cc NA, 80 or 82 PS (59 or 60 kW) JIS (Japan) – BA2N9
- October 1978–198? 1,769 cc VC, 95 PS (70 kW) JIS (Japan) – BA2V8/BA2V9
- October 1979 – 1983 1,415 cc UC, 70 PS (51 kW) / 76 PS (56 kW) JIS (Japan) – BA2U9
- October 1979 – 1983 2,209 cc S2, 66 PS (49 kW) / 70 PS (51 kW) JIS (Japan) - BA2S9

== Third generation (1983–1999) ==
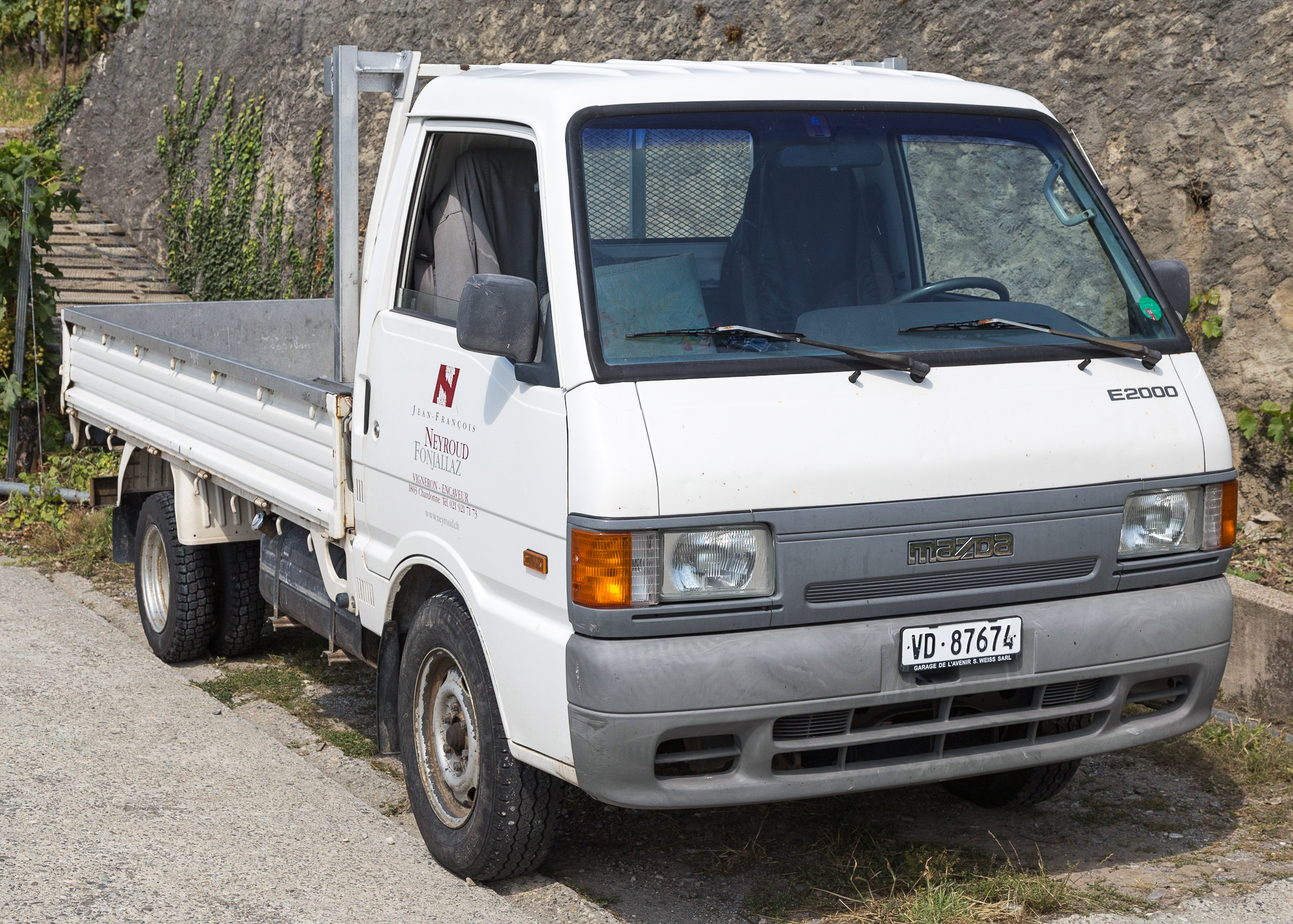
Third generation Mazda E2000 (export-market name for the Bongo)

The Bongo was updated in September 1983 with the third generation, which also received new engines. The third generation was redesigned in November 1986, with a new front end with lower, wider headlamps. For Japanese buyers, the 1.8 petrol was replaced with a 2-litre version of the same, while a diesel-engined 4WD version was new (previously, 4WD had only been available with the petrol engine). Also new was a mid-height roof, only available on the 2WD models.

The Bongo was also sold by Ford in Asia as the "Spectron" (passenger version) or as the "J80" (cargo model). In Australia, as in most of Mazda's export markets, the Bongo was sold by Mazda as the E-series. In Australia Ford also retailed the Bongo, with the commercial version known as the "Ford Econovan" and the passenger version as the "Ford Spectron" (1983–1990). From 1994 onwards, the Bongo was also sold by Nissan as the Vanette. In South Korea this was built as the Kia Wide Bongo. In South Africa, it was sold as the Ford Spectron.

During the 1980s, Toyota, Nissan, and Mitsubishi all sold versions of their utility vans in the United States, however none achieved any real market success and so Mazda decided not to bring the Bongo to the US. Instead, they created the more passenger car-like MPV for the American market.

=== Australia ===
In Australia, it was sold as the Mazda E-series and the Mazda Traveller and also as the Ford Econovan and Ford Spectron. The entry-level Econovan offered a 4-metre (13.1 ft) length, 1.8-litre petrol engine, five-speed manual of four-speed automatic, single rear wheels, in three-seater steel-sided or six seater XL window-sided forms. Prior to 1986, there was also a 1.4-litre engine and five-speed manual option available as a steel-sided van with single- or dual-rear wheels, and as a passenger-carrying XL van with single-rear wheels.

The 4.4-metre (14.4 ft) long Econovan Maxi offered a high roof, 2.0-litre petrol engine with five-speed manual or four-speed automatic, single rear wheels, and three-seater steel-sided or six seater XL window-sided forms. Dual rear wheels were available for the 2.0-litre petrol or a 2.2-litre diesel, both with five-speed manual and as steel-sided vans.

The 4.7-metre (15.4 ft) long Econovan Maxi van was also high roofed, but steel-sided only. Powertrain and rear wheel setups were the same as the 4.4-metre Maxi. In 1986, four-wheel drive became an option for the 4.7-metre long model in conjunction with the windowed body work, manual transmission, and 2.0-litre engine. A cab chassis version was offered on the 4.7-metre chassis, with 2.0-litre petrol engine with five-speed manual. It was available as a two-door, three-seater model with 1.5-tonne (3,300 lb) payload and as a four-door, six-seater "Crew Cab" with 1.4-tonne (3,100 lb) payload.

In December 1985, Ford updated the Econovan in Australia to upgrade the engines for unleaded petrol. The petrol engine fitted to 4.0-metre Econovan increased in displacement from 1.4 to 1.8 litres, and the 4.4-metre Maxi had its petrol engine increased from 1.8 to 2.0 litres. The 4.0- and 4.4-metre Econovan also gained the availability of four-speed automatic, previously fitted only to the Spectron vans. The 4.7-metre Maxi van, previously available only with dual rear wheels, was now also available with single rear wheels, although crew cab and cab chassis models remained as dual rear wheel propositions. Ford stated that all petrol manuals and the 4.4-metre petrol automatic Maxi were designed to run on both leaded and unleaded fuel, although the 4.0-metre petrol automatic will run only on unleaded. At the same time as these powertrain updates, Ford also made some cosmetic changes to the Spectron. The low-roof Spectron added colour-keyed bumpers and a new side stripe, matched to a new beige cloth interior trim, and on the XLT the old beige interior colour switched to grey.

=== Engines ===
Petrol

- 1984 - 1985 1,415 cc UC
- 1984 - 1994 1,490 cc D5
- 1984 - 1999 1,789 cc F8
- 1984 - 1988 1,998 cc FE

Diesel

- 1984–1995 1,998 cc Diesel
- 1984–1995 2,184 cc R2 Diesel
- 1984–1995 1,998 cc RF Diesel
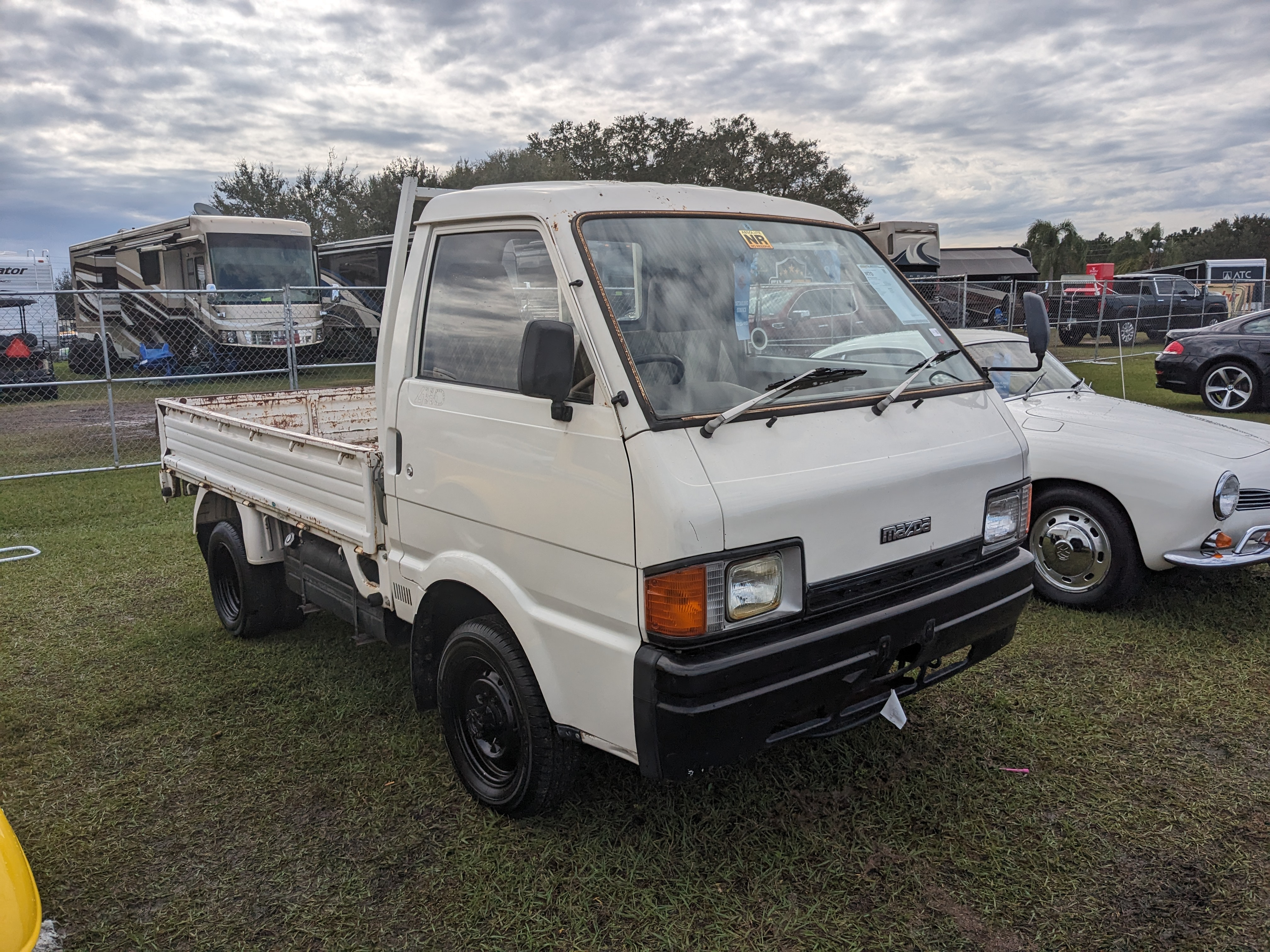
Mazda Bongo Truck (Japan; pre-facelift)

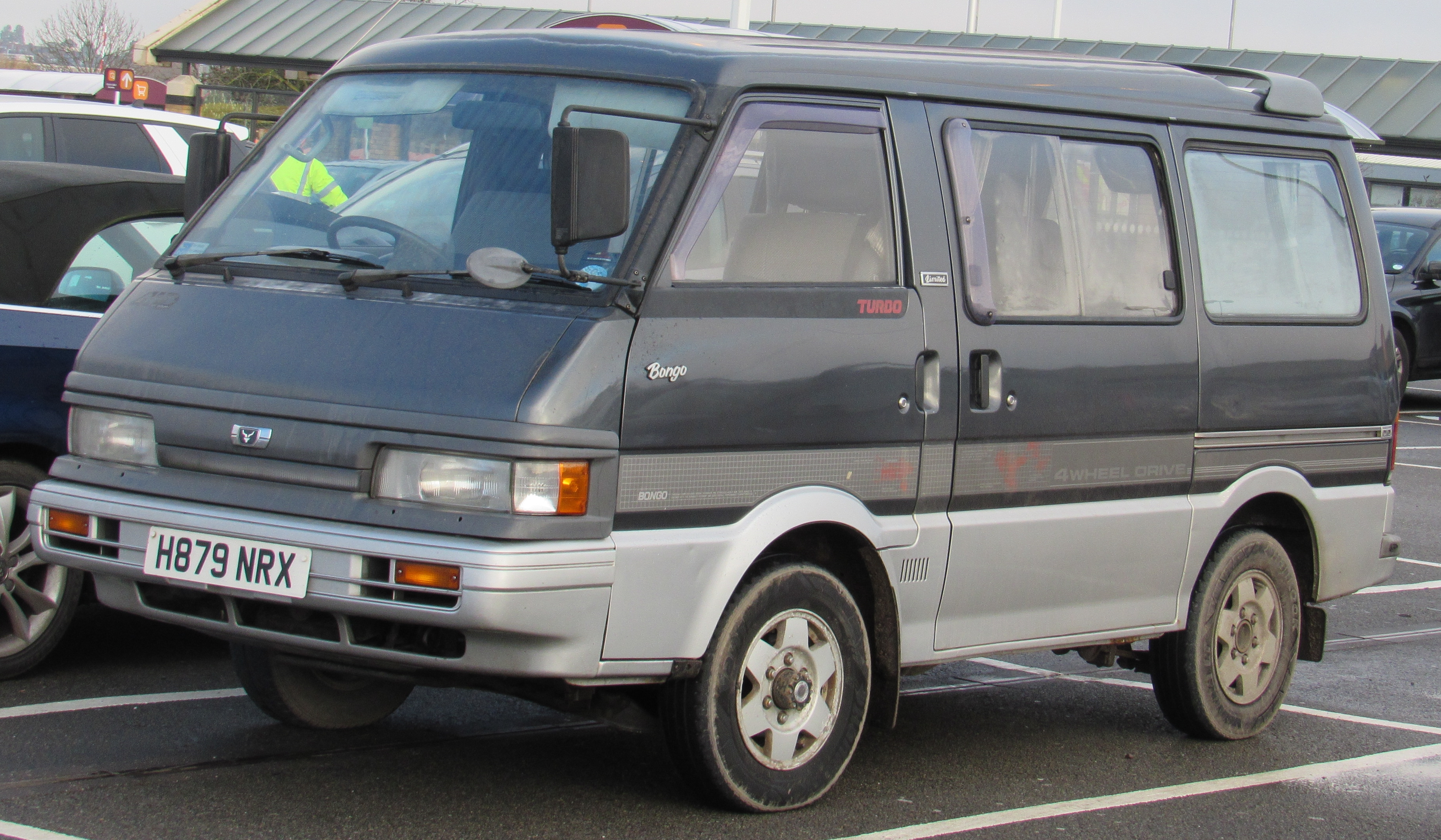
Mazda Bongo Wagon
(second facelift)

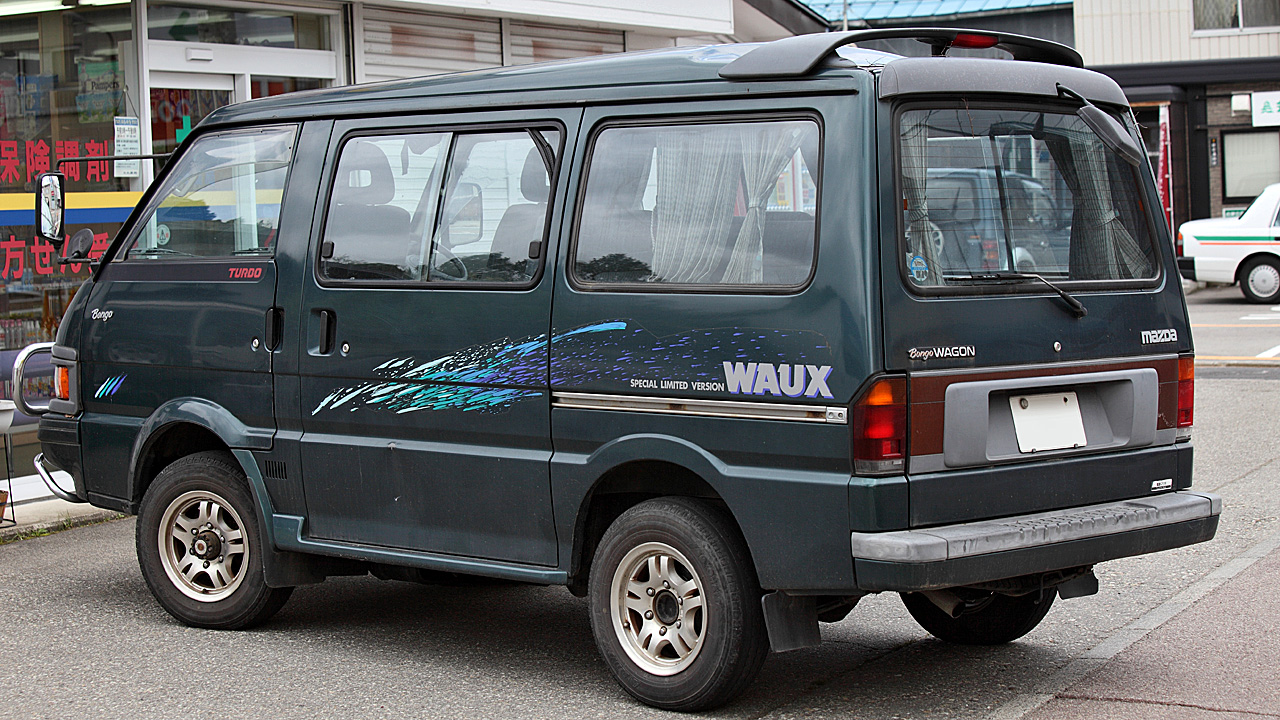
Mazda Bongo Wagon
(Japan; second facelift)

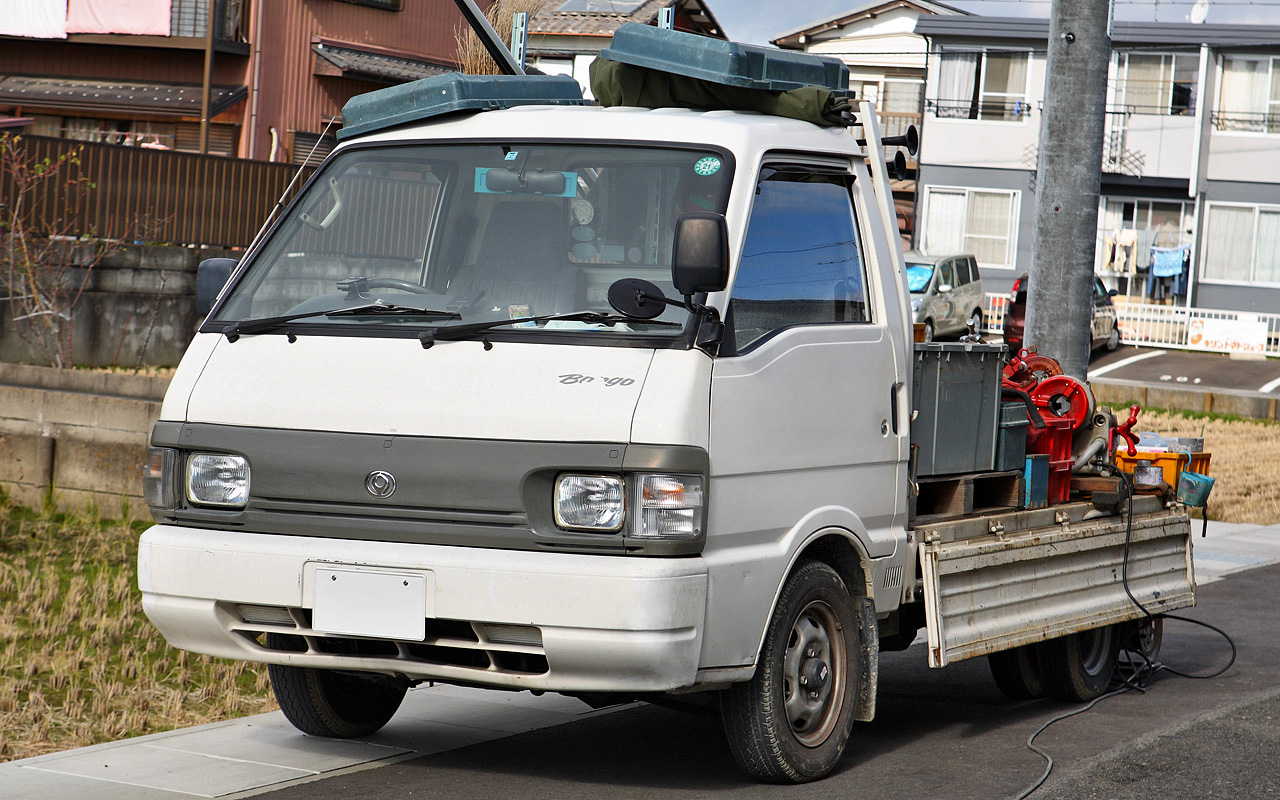
Mazda Bongo (Japan; second facelift)

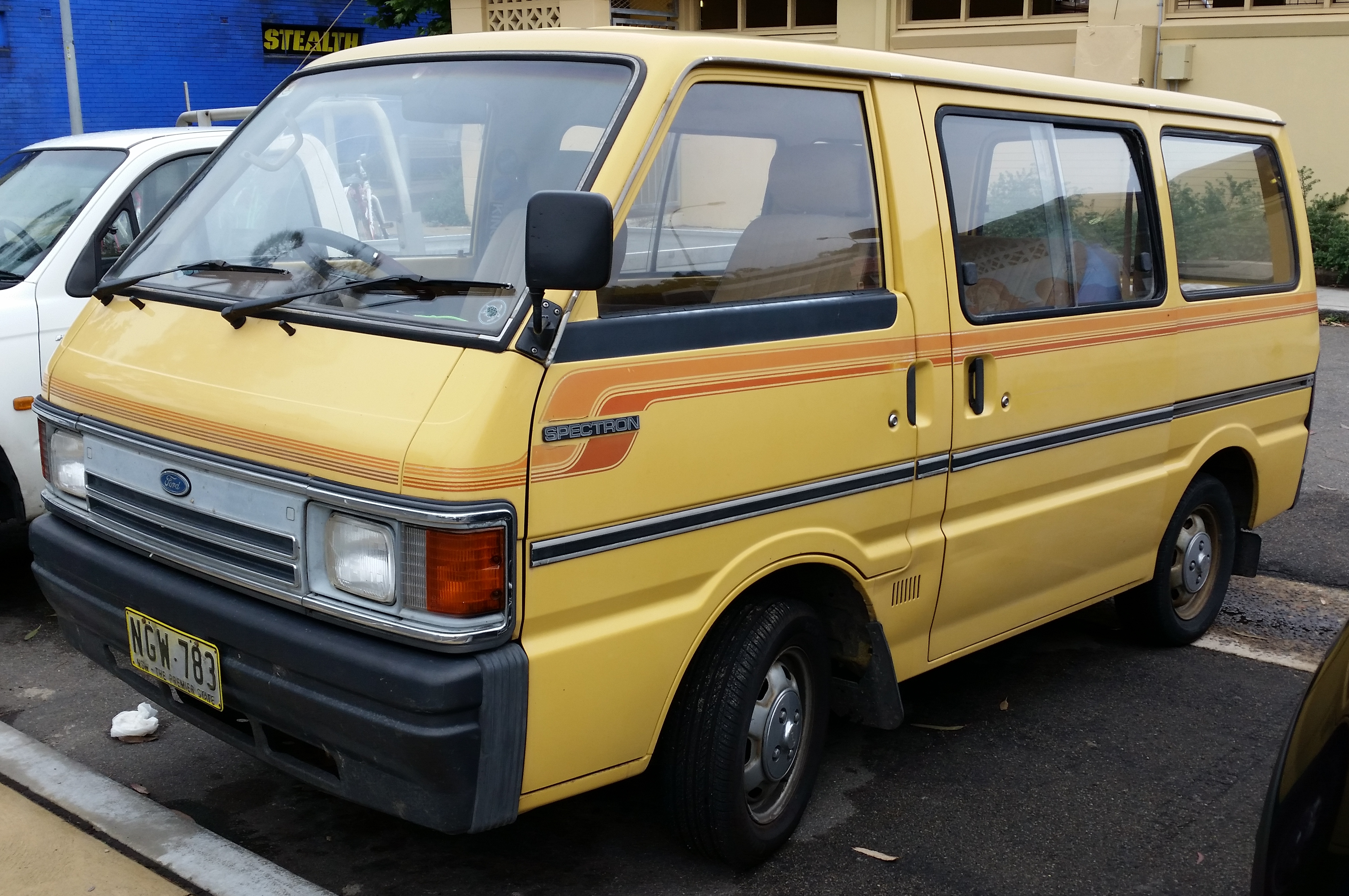
Ford Spectron (Australia; pre-facelift)

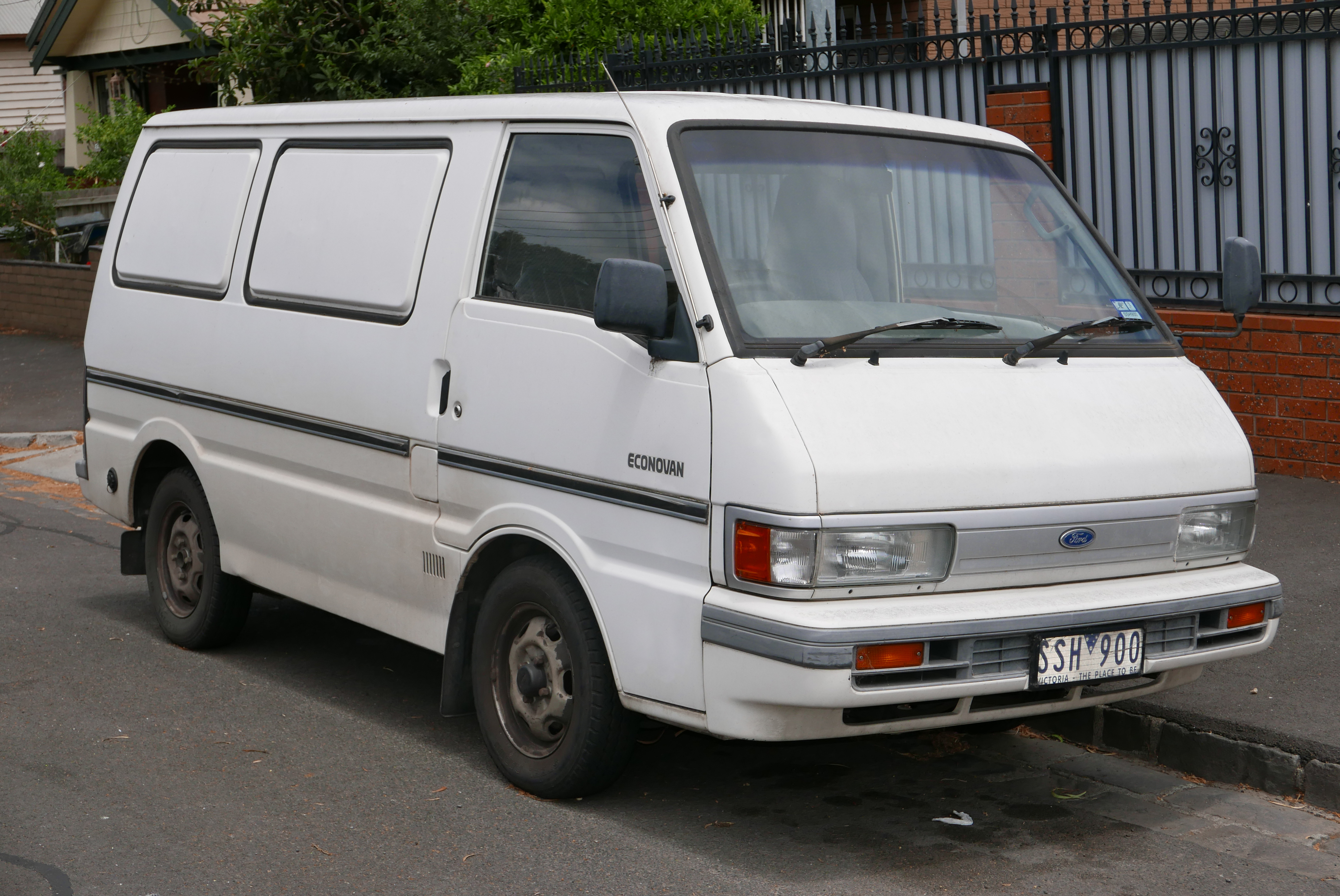
Ford Econovan
(Australia; first facelift)

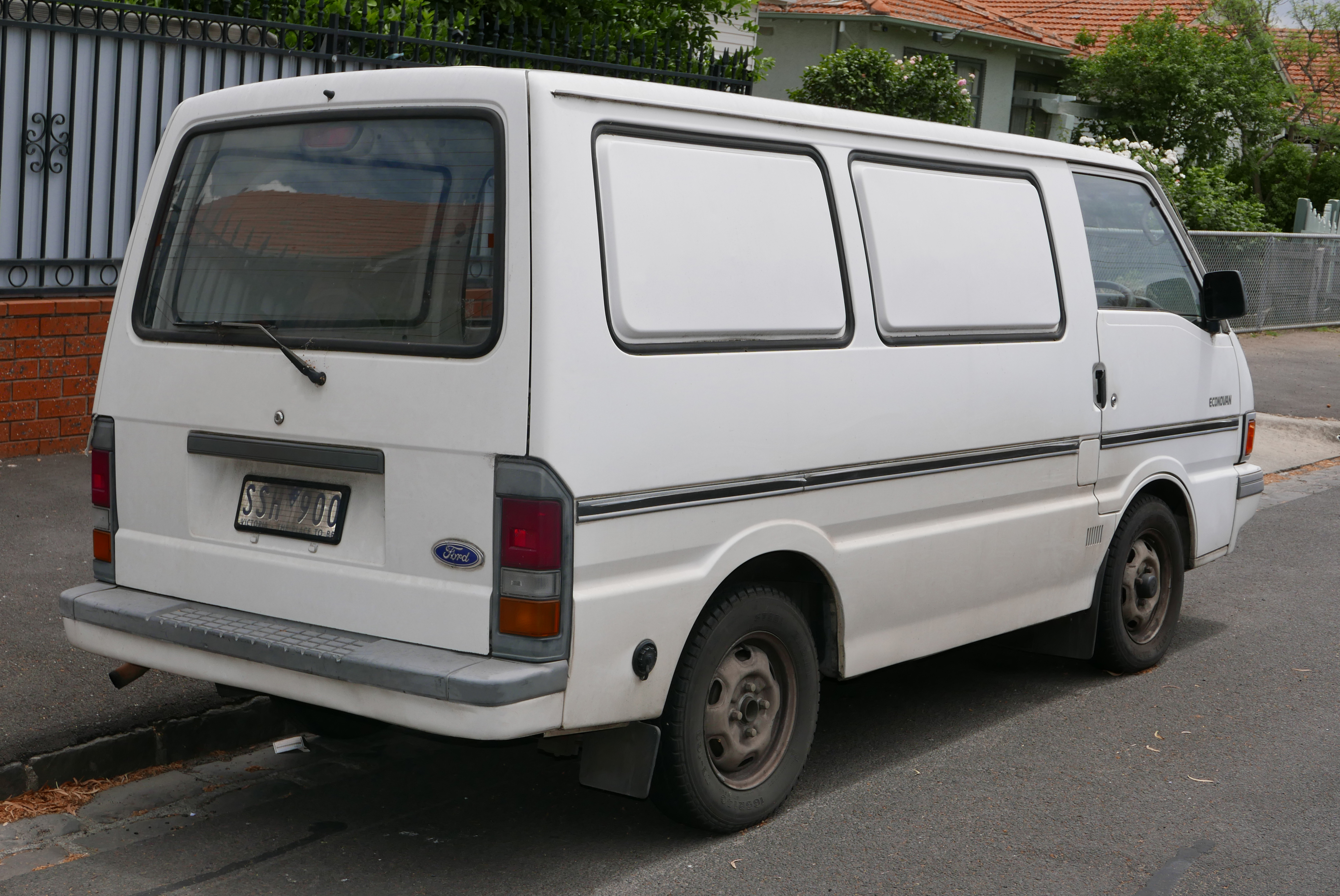
Ford Econovan
(Australia; first facelift)

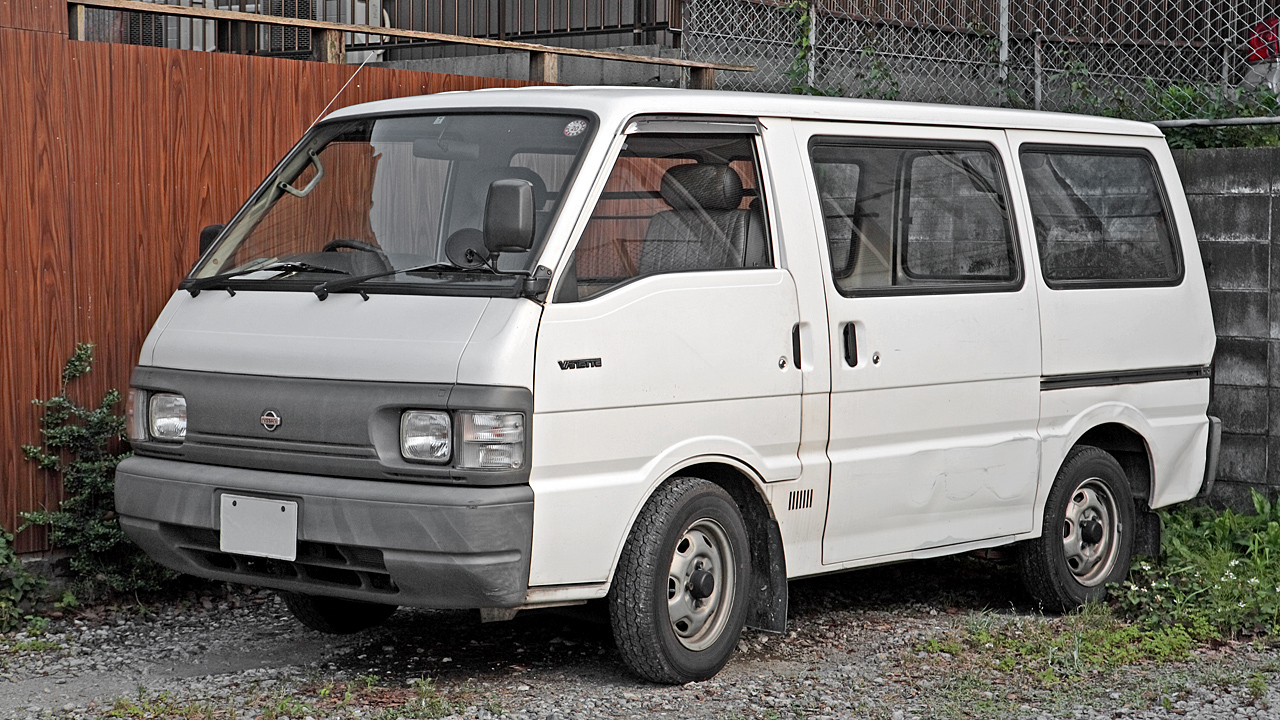
Nissan Vanette (Japan; second facelift)

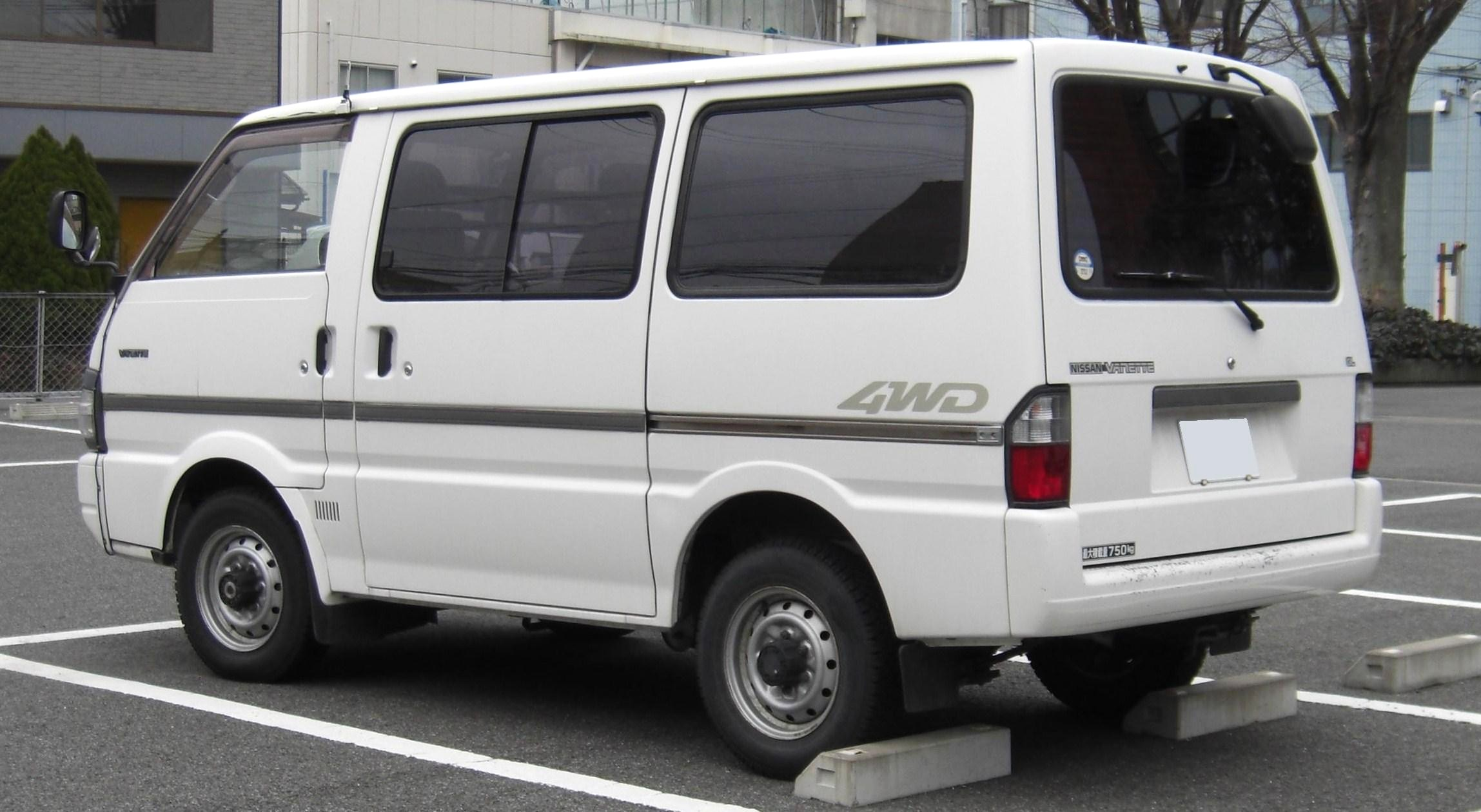
Nissan Vanette (Japan; second facelift)

== Fourth generation (SK/SL; 1999–2020) ==
Fourth generation
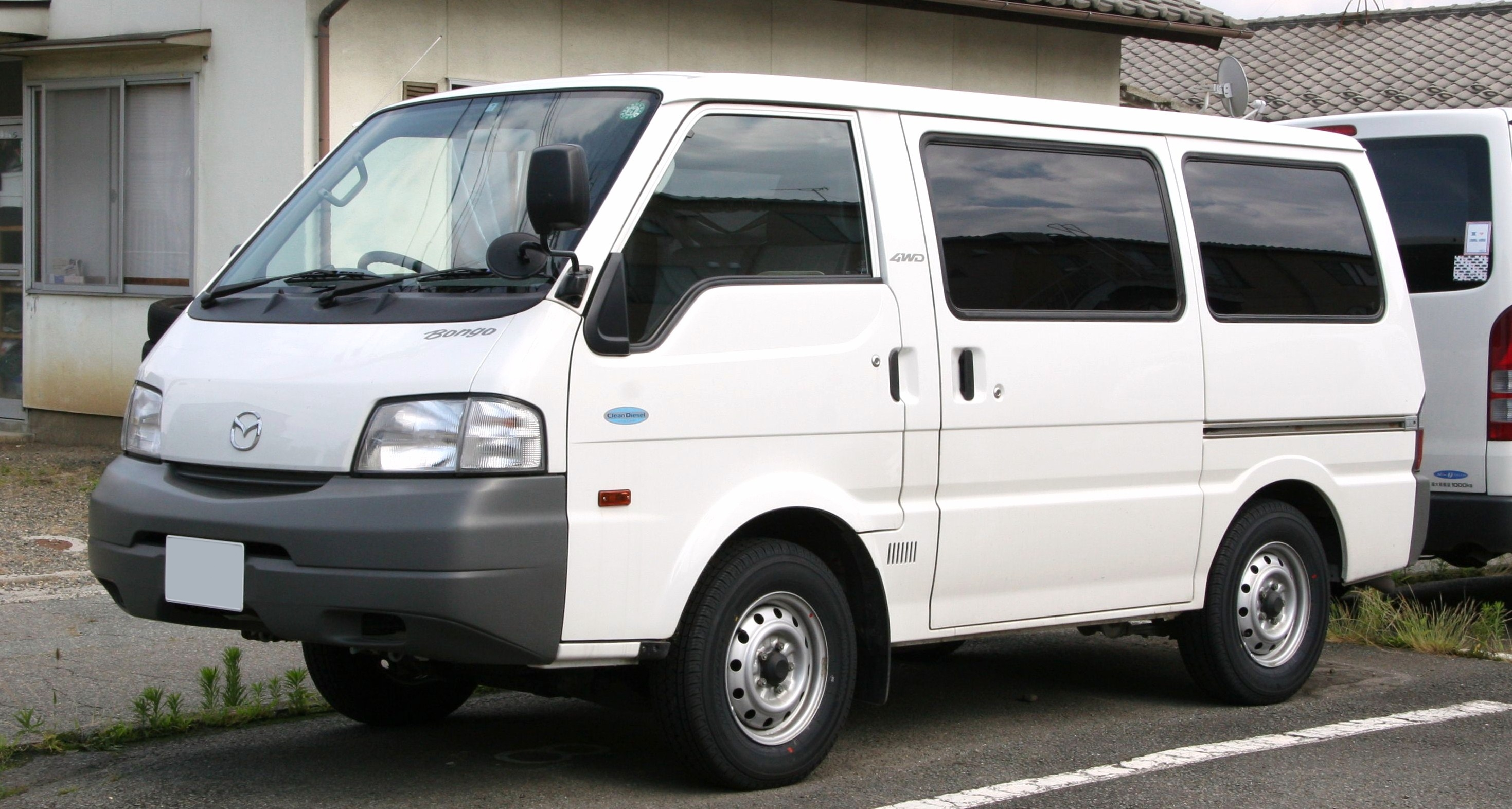

Overview
- Also called: Nissan Vanette Van/Truck; Mitsubishi Delica Cargo; Ford Econovan
- Production: June 1999–July 2020

Body and chassis
- Layout: Front mid-engine, rear-wheel-drive; Front mid-engine, four-wheel-drive
- Platform: Mazda SK platform

Powertrain
- Engine: Petrol: 1800 cc L8 I4; 1800 cc F8 I4; 1800 cc F8-E I4; Diesel: 2000 cc RF I4; 2200 cc R2 I4
- Transmission: 5-speed manual; 4-speed automatic; 5-speed autmatic

Dimensions
- Wheelbase: 2,200 mm (86.6 in)
- Length: 4,280 mm (168.5 in) (van); 4,335 mm (170.7 in) (truck)
- Width: 1,630 mm (64.2 in)
- Height: 1,865 mm (73.4 in) (van); 1,910 mm (75.2 in) (truck)
- Curb weight: 1,290–1,390 kg (2,844–3,064 lb)

Chronology
- Successor: Mazda Bongo (fourth generation)

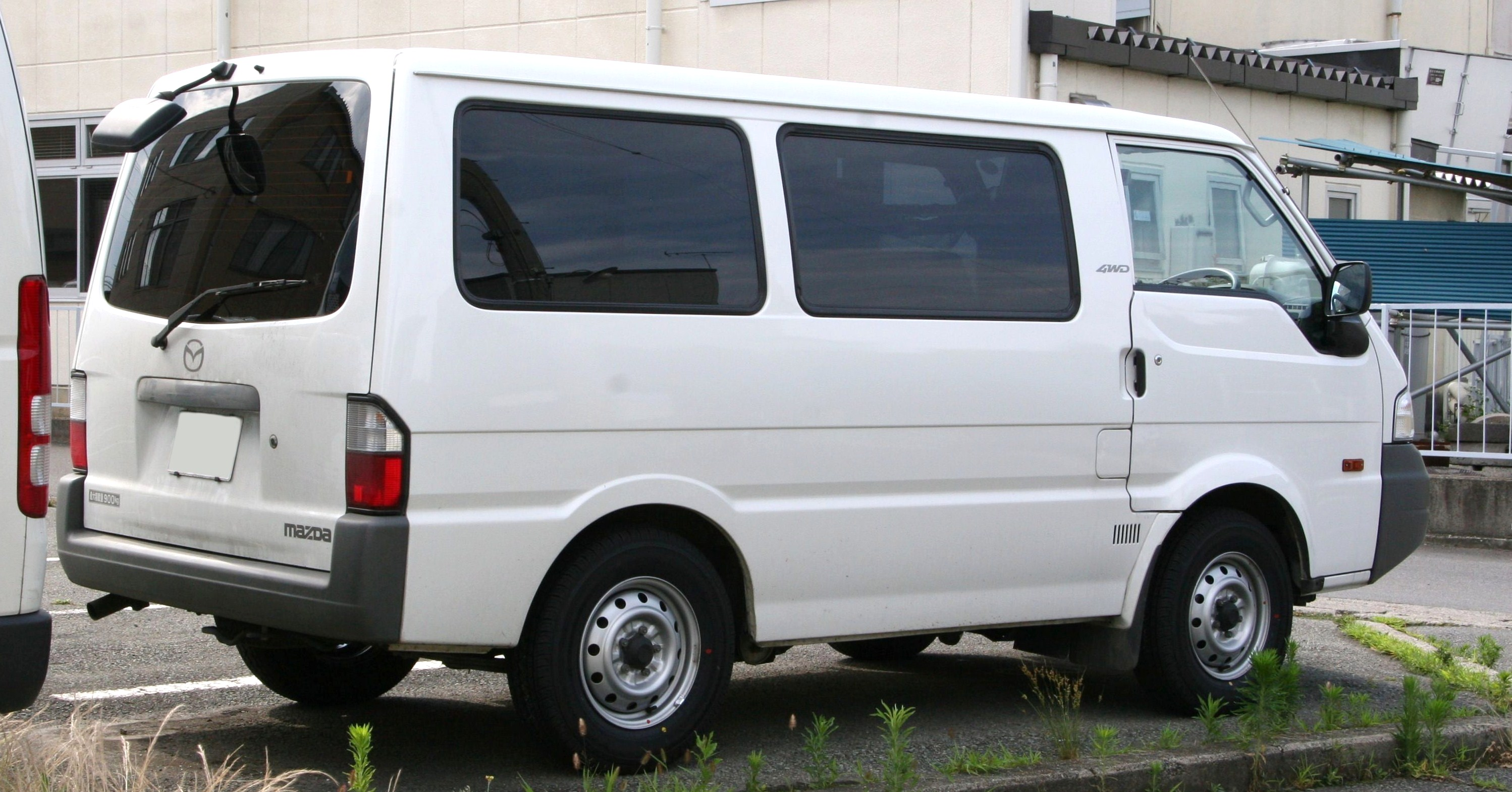
Mazda Bongo Van with single sliding door

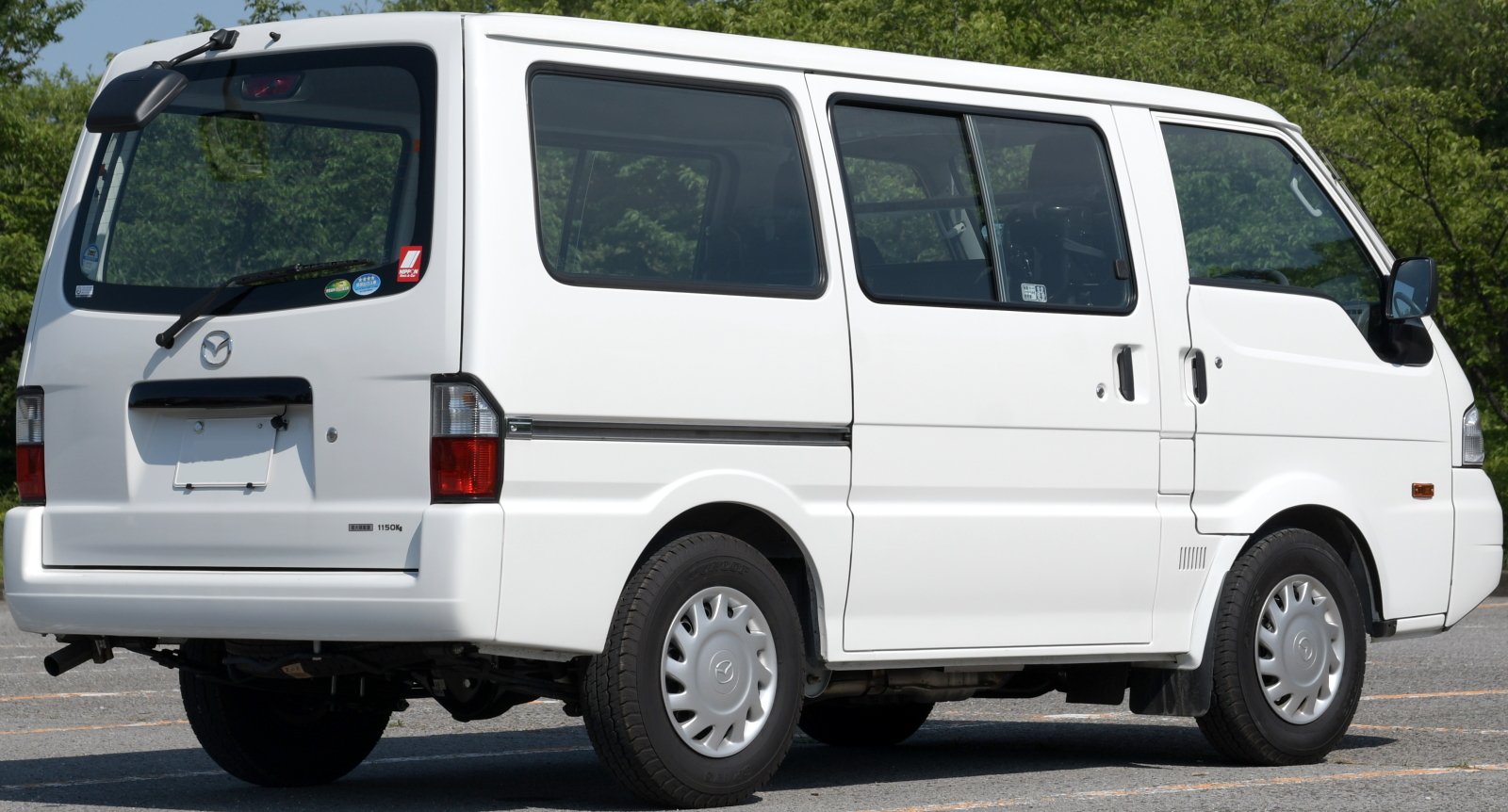
Mazda Bongo Van DX with dual sliding door

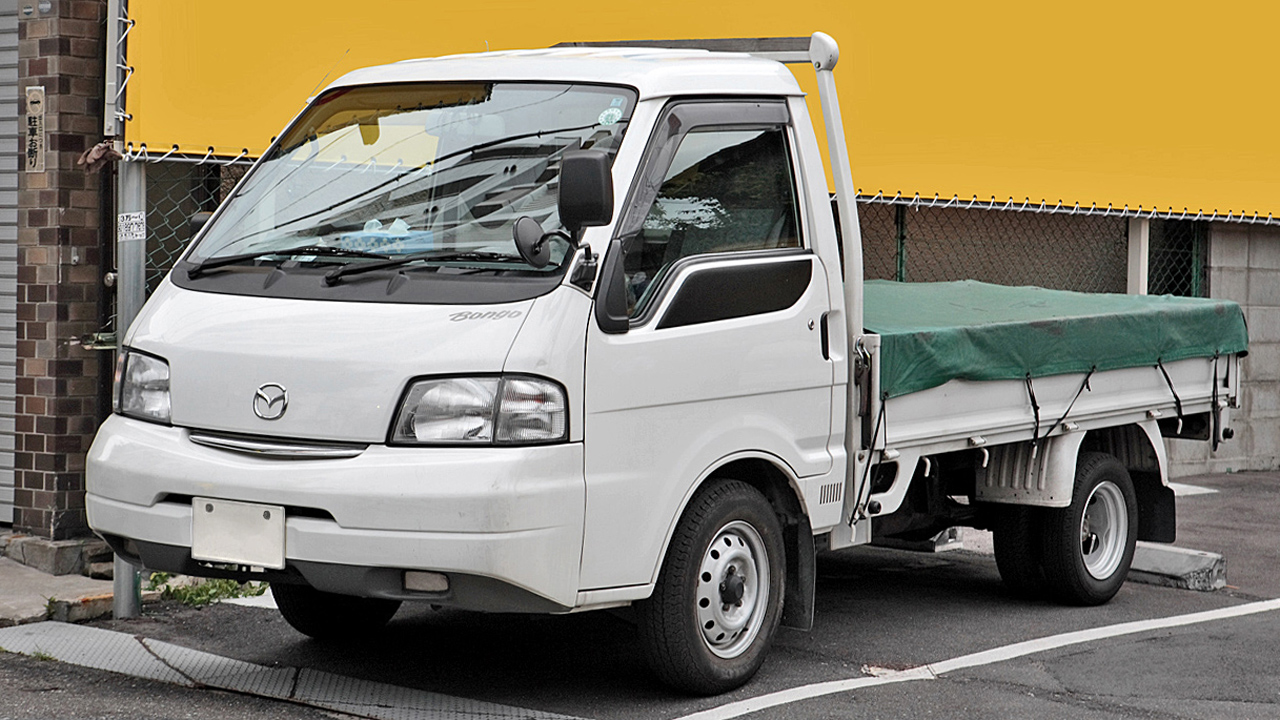
Mazda Bongo Truck

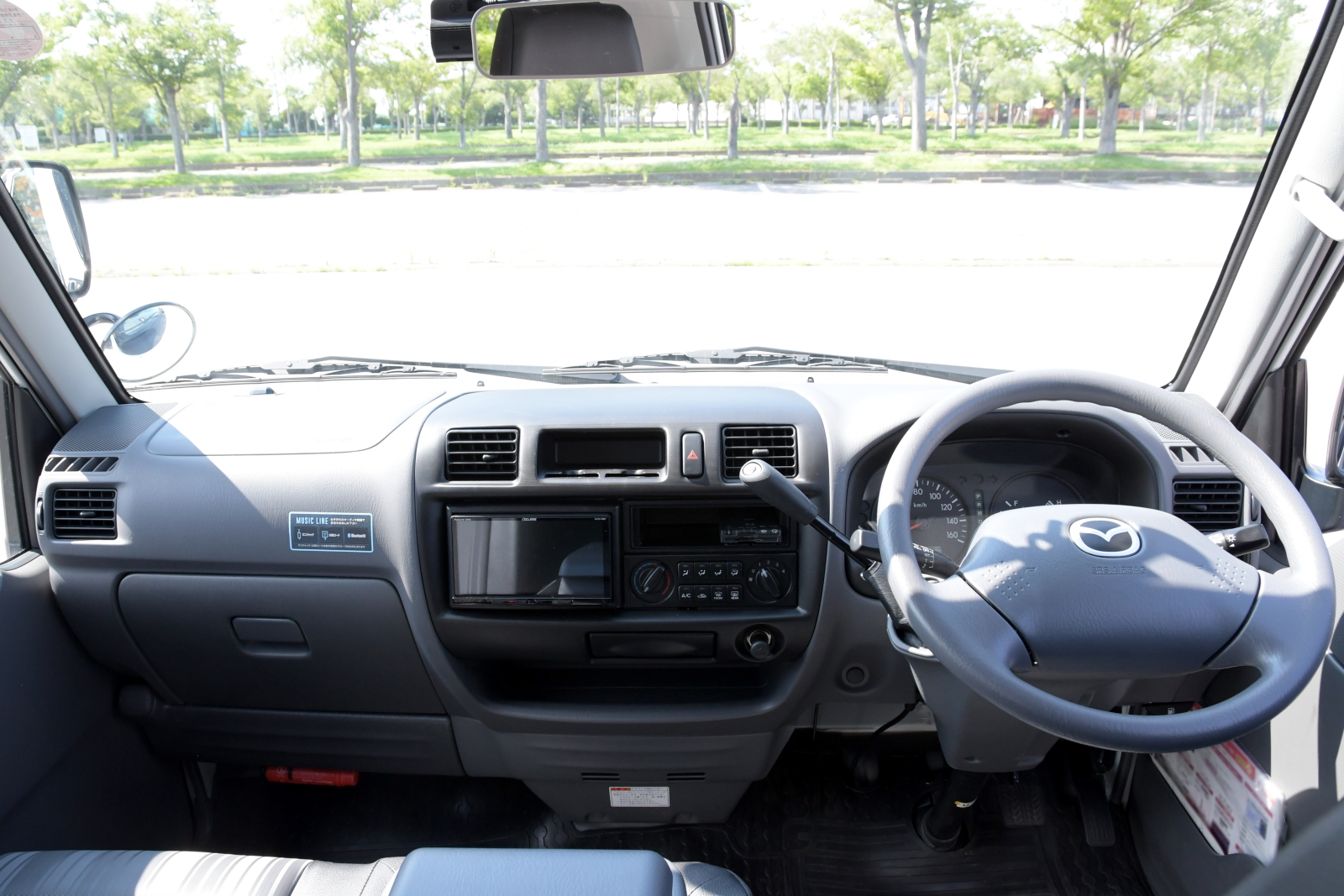
Interior

In June 1999, a new generation of Bongo vans and trucks went on sale, which were also rebadged as the Mazda E-series, Ford Econovan, Mitsubishi Delica Van/Truck, and Nissan Vanette. This model adopted the SK platform which was based on the previous generation SS/SE model. This was sold at various Mazda, Mazda Anfini and Mazda Autozam dealers. On August 20, 2010, an upgraded Bongo truck/van were officially released in Japan.

Mazda's difficult business environment at the time meant they could not afford to build a full brand new platform. A petrol 1.8-litre EGI F8-E with 90 PS (66 kW) and a diesel 2.2-litre R2 with 79 PS (58 kW) were available. Mazda announced that this is the last generation of in-house designed Bongo vans and trucks in March 2012. Mazda discontinued the Bongo in 2020 and it will focus on fuel efficient passenger cars.

- November 1999: the Mitsubishi Delica Cargo was Rebadged and released in Japan only.
- December 2003: A new common rail direct fuel injection diesel model was introduced.
- November 2005: Minor updates on exterior lighting.
- 2006: the Australian-market E1800 (SKW0) is discontinued.
- August 2007: DPF introduced for diesel engine models. Power windows and central locking were also introduced for all truck models.
- May 2009: due to Nissan's in-house NV200 Vanette, sales of the 2WD petrol models were stopped.
- August 2010: Minor updates for the entire range include the introduction of a new 1.8-litre L8 petrol engine. This required a larger center console box which reduced seating capacity. New model codes (SKP2T/SKP2L) were applied.
- 2011: The New Zealand market E1800 (SKW0) was discontinued.
- October 2011: The rebadged Mitsubishi Delica model was discontinued, with the nameplate shifted onto the Nissan NV200 Vanette in an OEM deal.
- March 2012: Mazda announced that this would be the last generation of in-house designed Bongo vans and trucks, with the company withdrawing from commercial vehicle production to focus on fuel efficient passenger cars.
- June 2012: Minor safety updated. Rear decal renewed. MAZDA decal deleted (van only).
- February 2016: Minor updated. New engine tune-up and increase fuel economy, Auto now became five-speed, dual-rear wheels model discontinued, 4W-ABS and Keyless entry for all models, new model codes SLP2V/SLP2M applied.
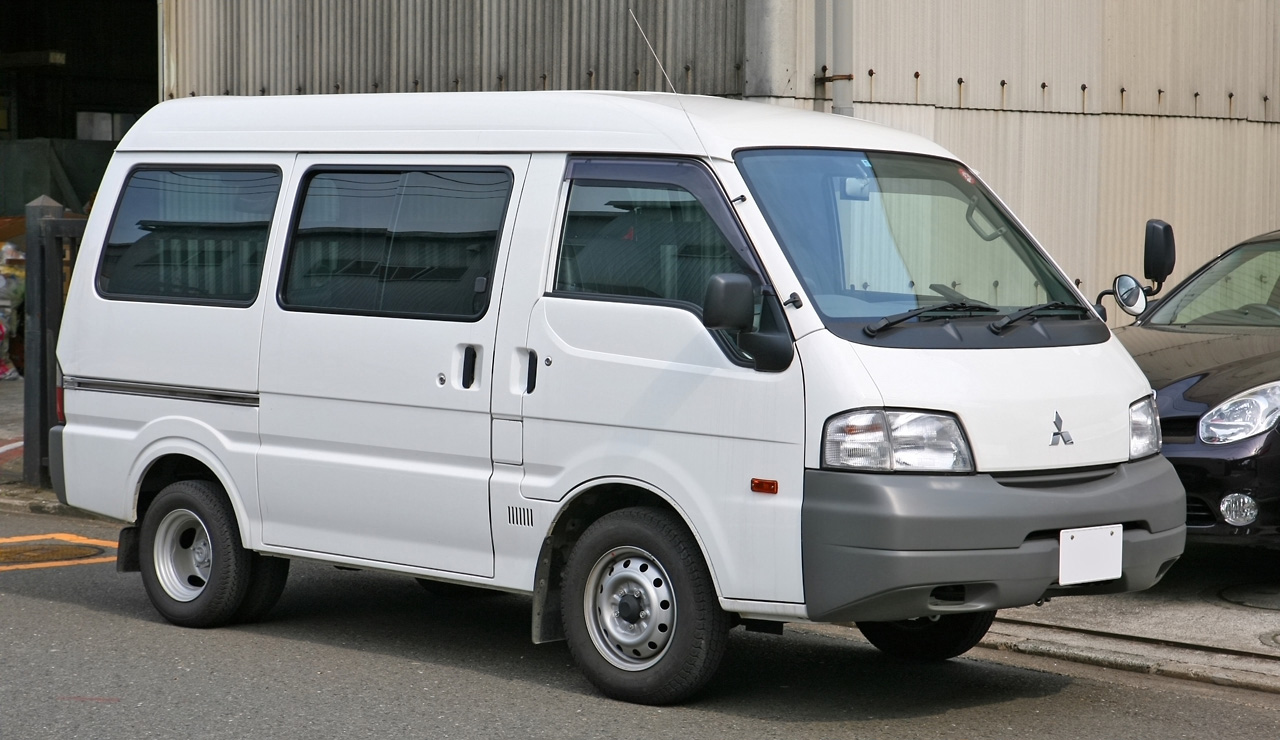
Mitsubishi Delica

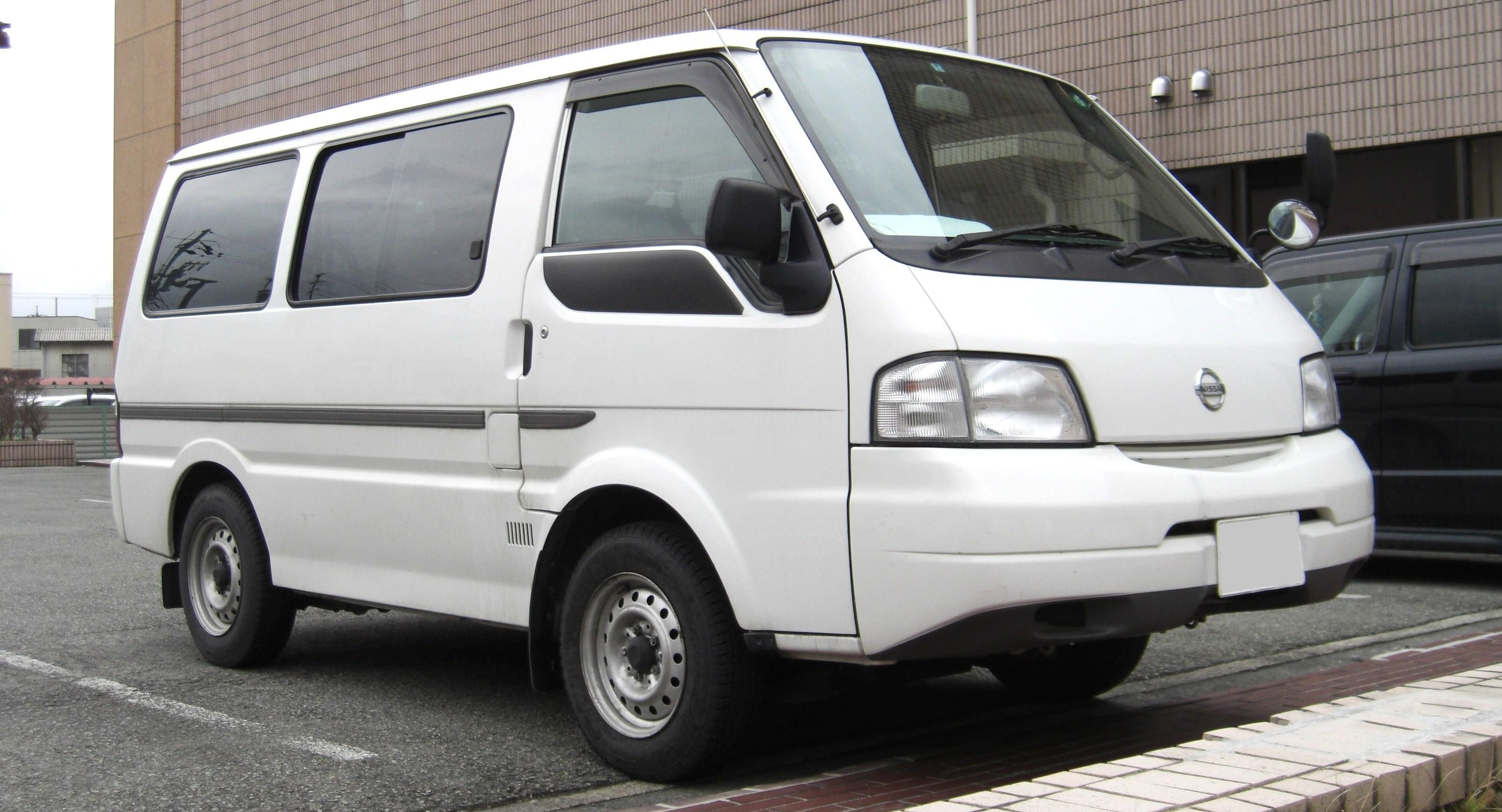
Nissan Vanette (GL trim)

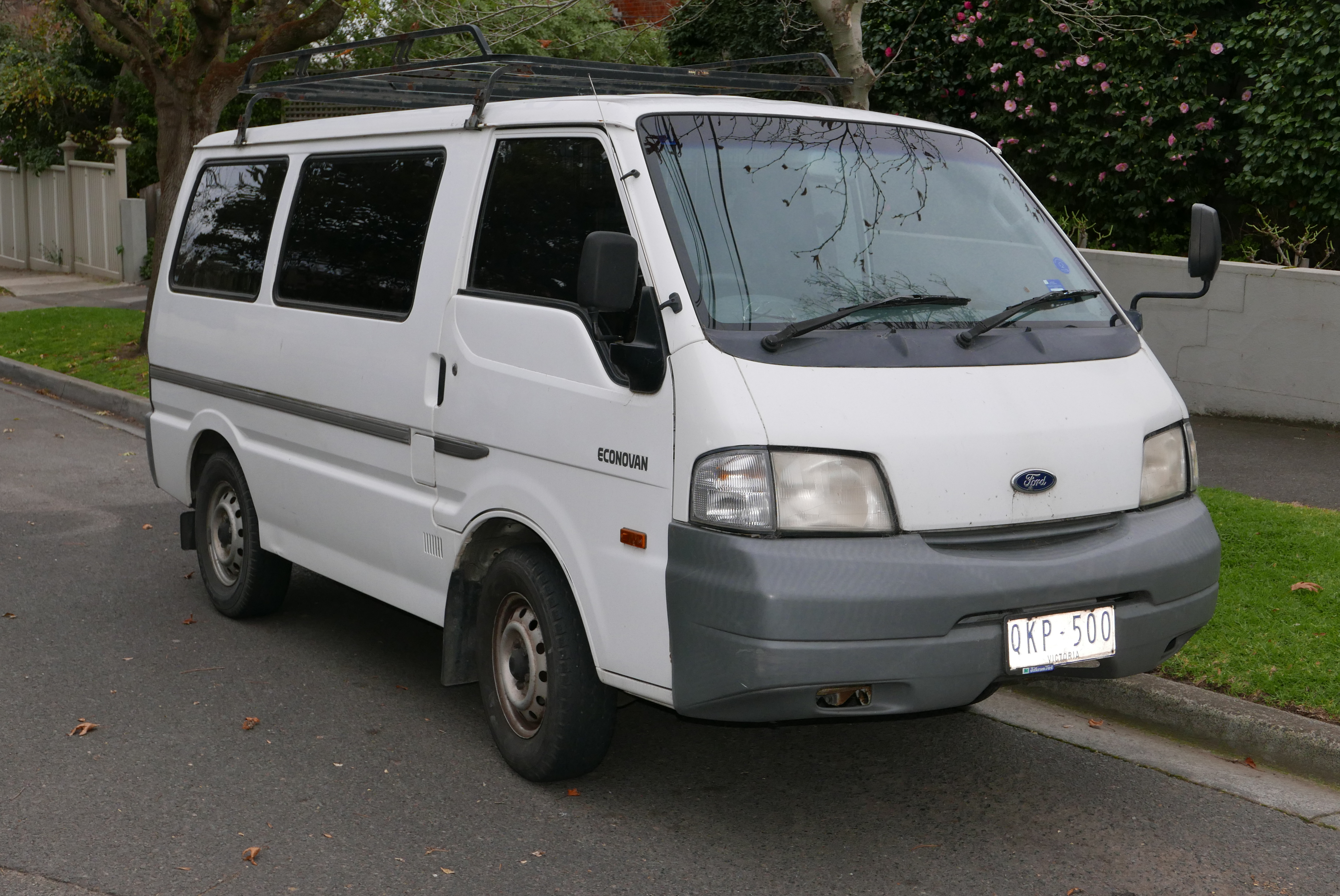
Ford Econovan (Australia)

== Fifth generation ==
The Bongo nameplate was reintroduced in July 2020 in Japan and based on the Daihatsu Gran Max. It is available in van and truck model.

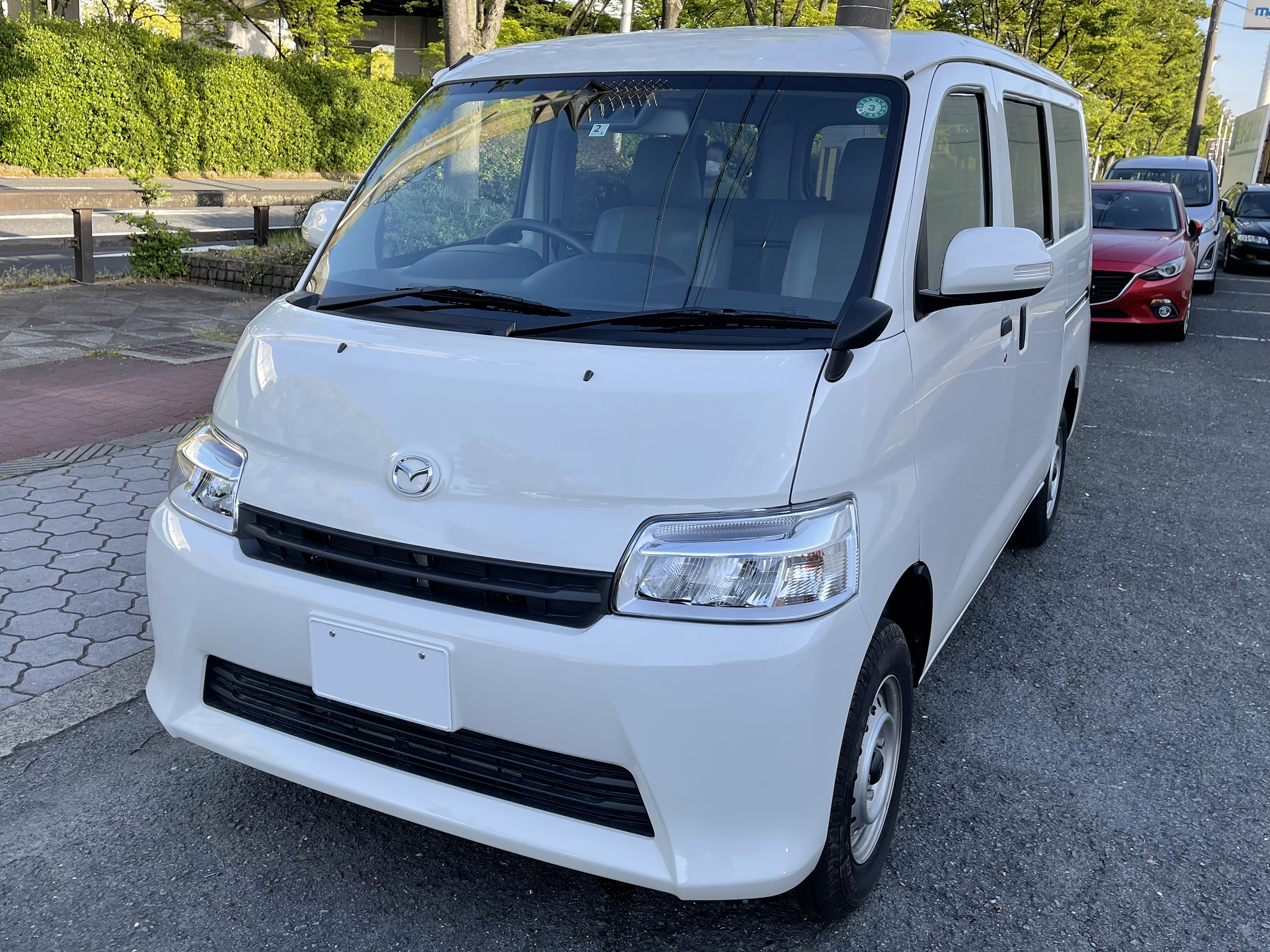
Mazda Bongo Van DX (S403Z)

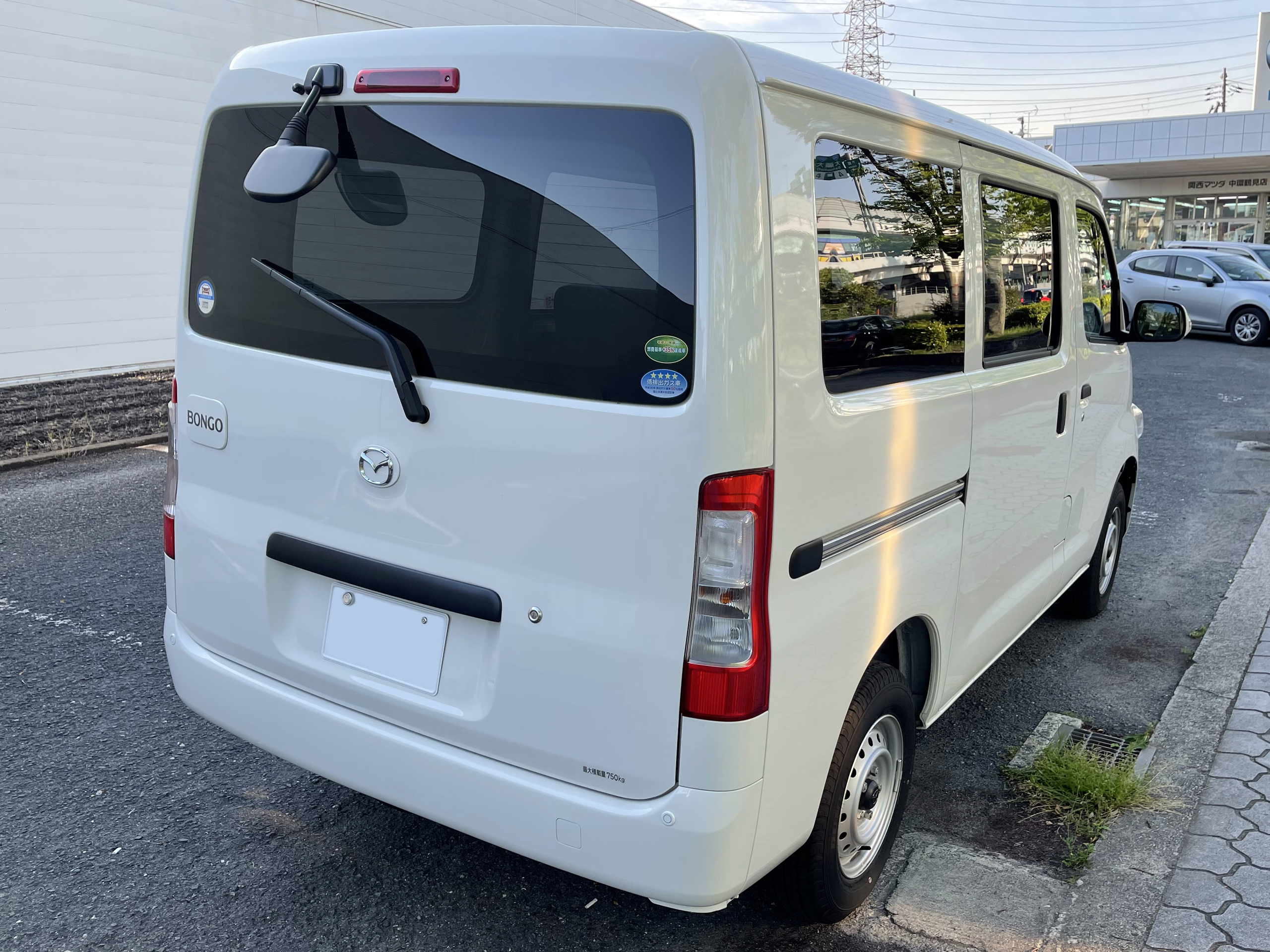
Mazda Bongo Van DX (S403Z)

== Bongo Brawny ==
A widened version of the Bongo called the Mazda Bongo Brawny (Japanese: マツダ ボンゴ ブローニー, Hepburn: Matsuda Bongo Burōnii). The Brawny was larger than the regular Bongo in by all key measures (wheelbase, length, width, height, and weight). In export markets this model was again sold as Mazda E-Series.

=== First generation (SR/SD, 1983–1999) ===
The first-generation Bongo Brawny was introduced in June 1983, three months before the regular Bongo. In Australia, Ford differentiated the long-wheelbase versions with the "Econovan Maxi" identifier. In Korea, it is also known as Kia Wide Bongo for truck variant and Kia Besta for van variant

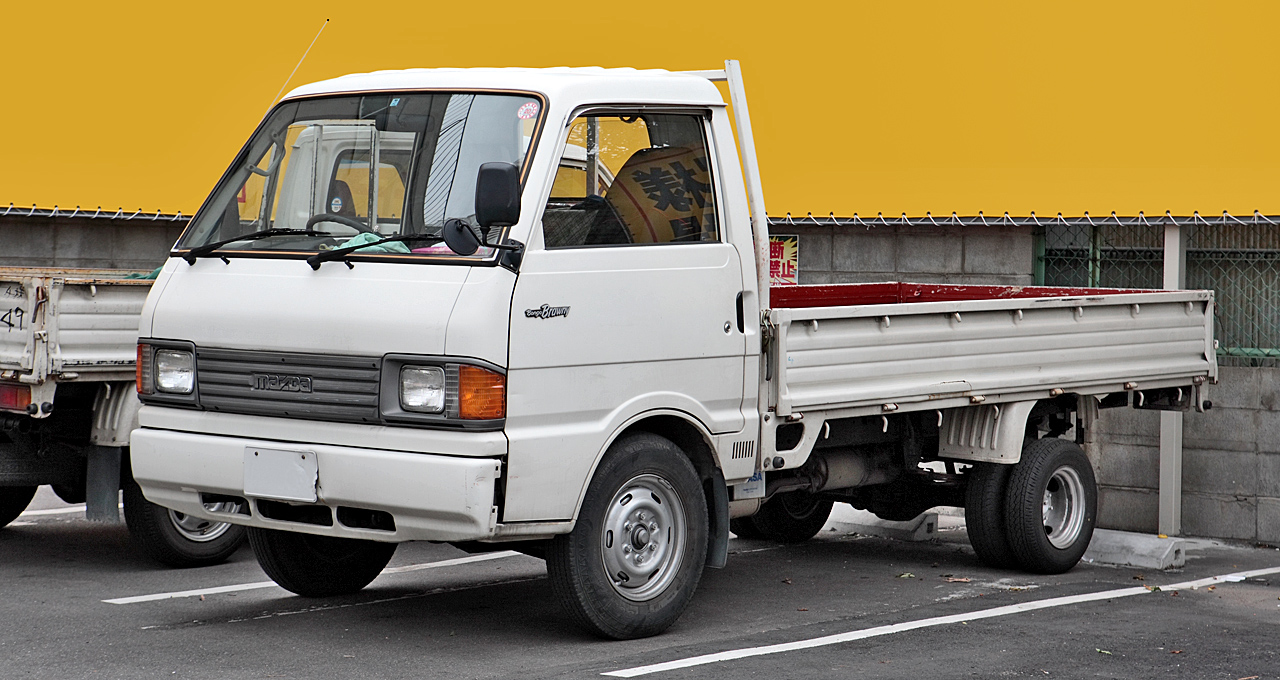
Mazda Bongo Brawny (Japan)

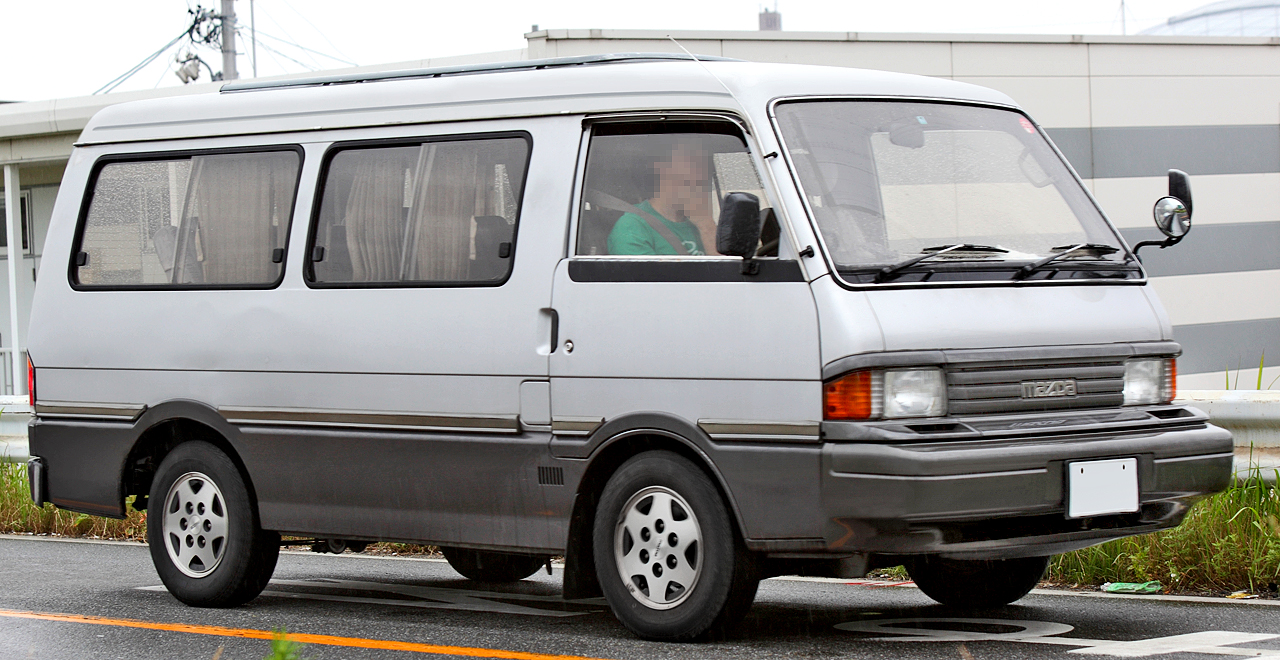
Mazda Bongo Brawny Wagon
(Japan; first facelift)

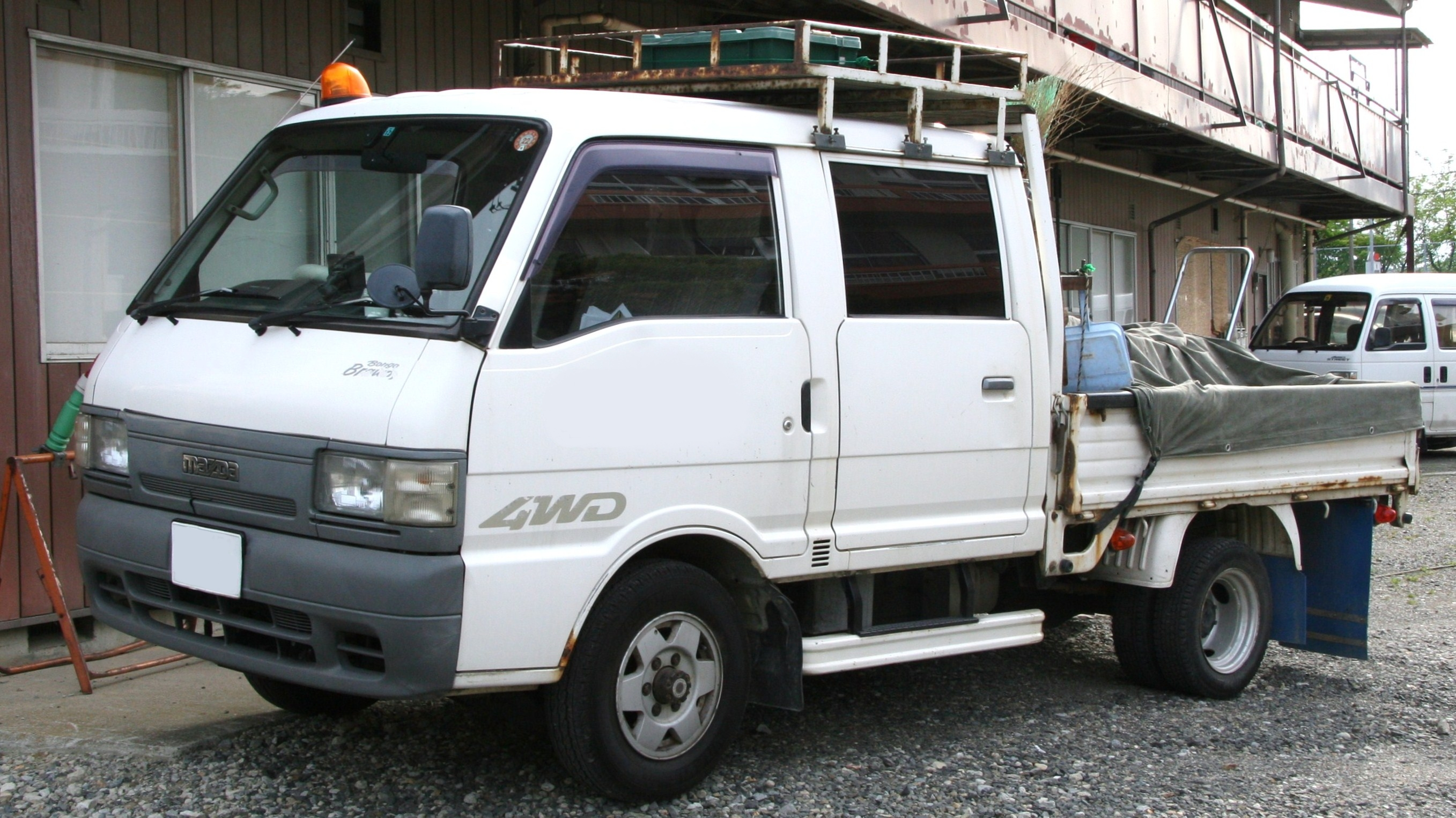
Mazda Bongo Brawny
(Japan; second facelift)

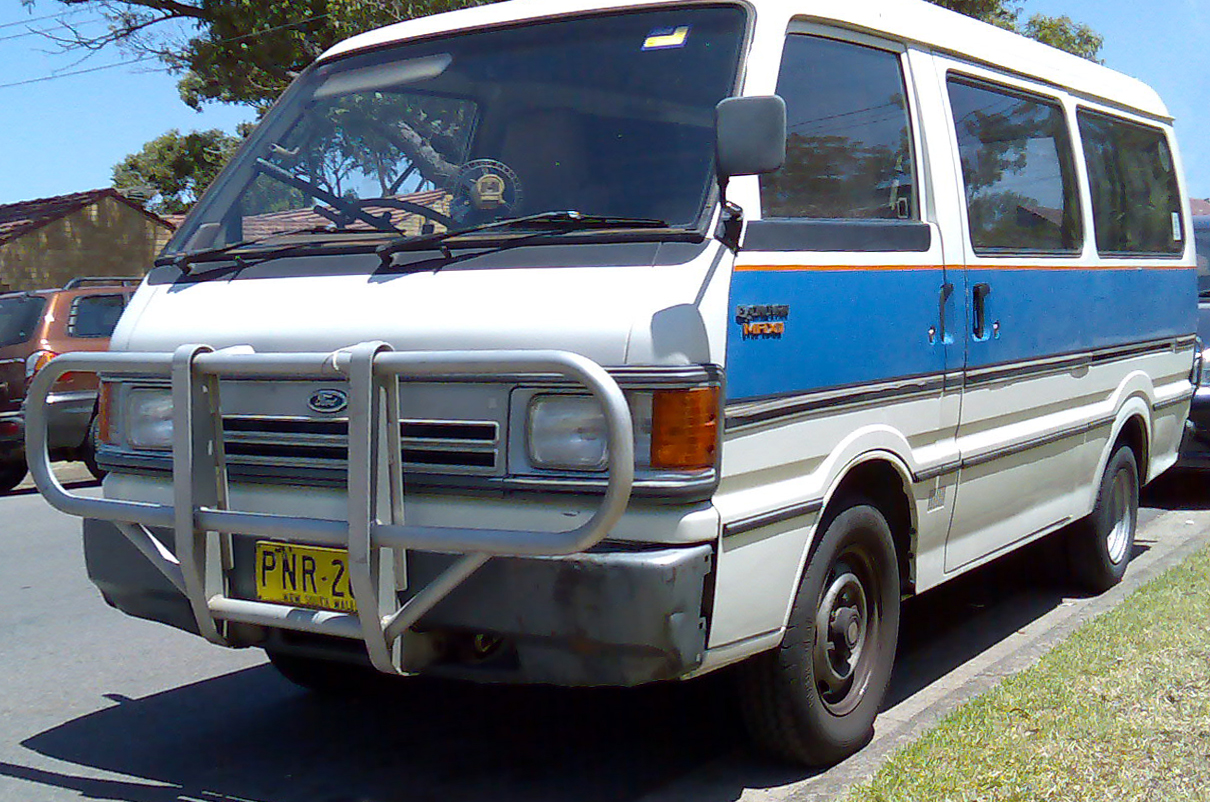
Ford Econovan Maxi
(Australia; pre-facelift)

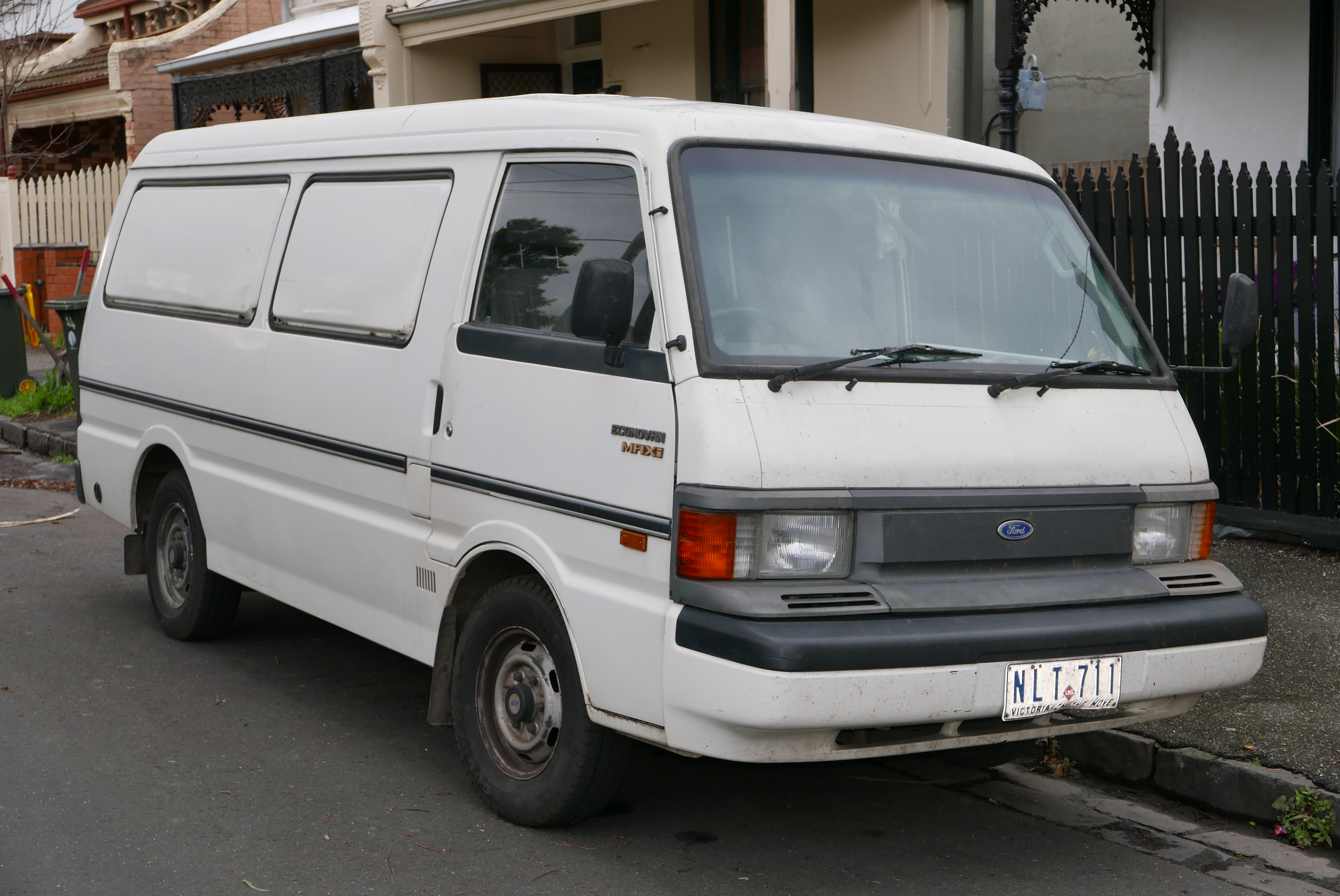
Ford Econovan Maxi
(Australia; first facelift)

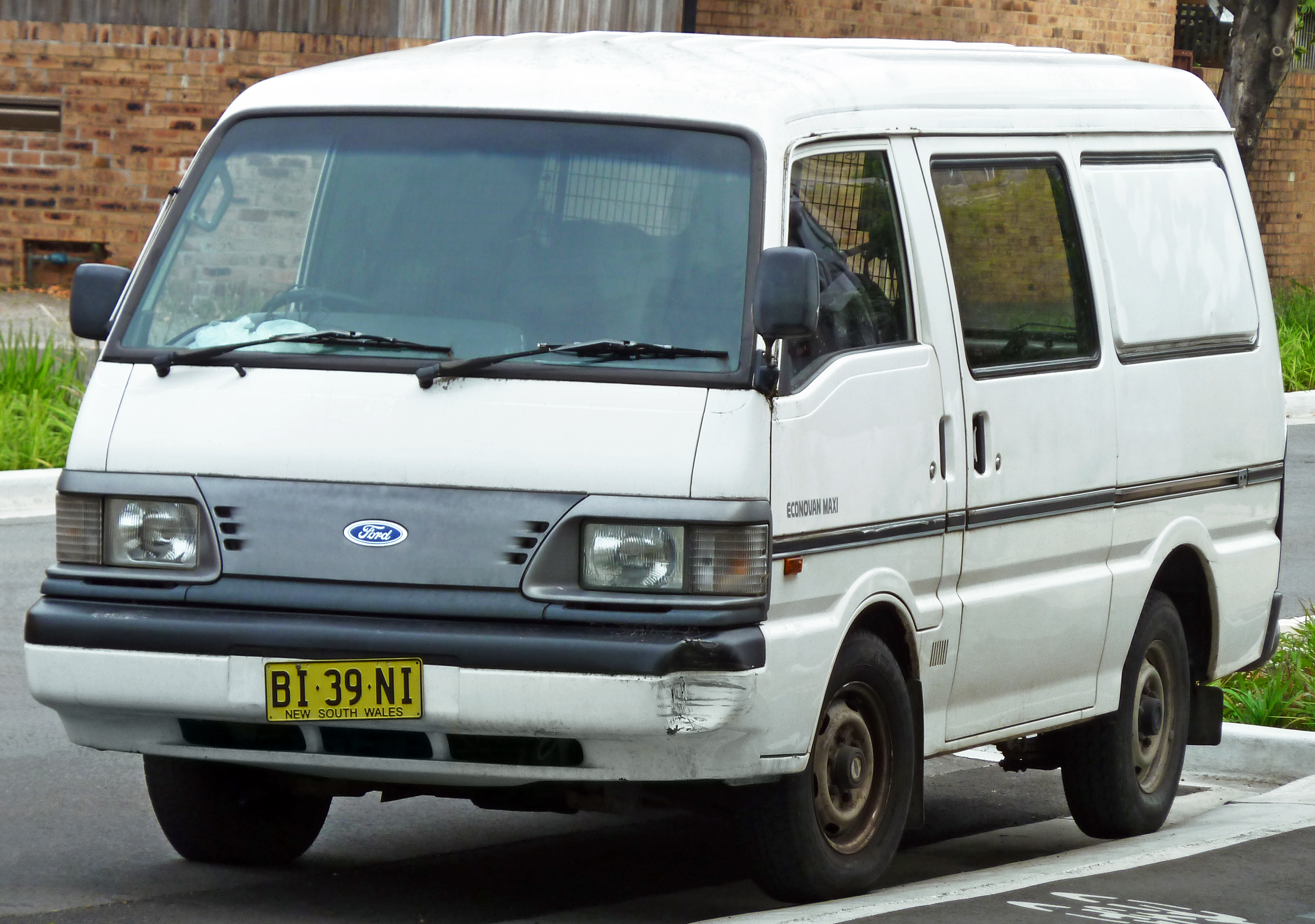
Ford Econovan Maxi
(Australia; second facelift)

=== Second generation (SK; 1999–2010) ===
The enlarged version of the Bongo, the Bongo Brawny was released in June 1999. This model also adopted the SK platform which is based on previous generation SS/SE model. Like the previous generation, the Bongo Brawny was larger in all key dimensions. It was available in both regular 2400 mm and long 2600 mm wheelbases. The Brawny retained many of the parts of the previous generation, such as the sliding side doors, and looks rather similar to the previous generation model. The E-series label continued to be used in export markets, although they were now fewer than before. The Bongo Brawny was discontinued in August 2010.

- November 1999: the Mitsubishi Delica Cargo was Rebadged and released in Japan only.
- October 2000: The truck model was discontinued due to the introduction of the Mazda Titan Dash 1-ton.
- December 2004: Minor changes include the introduction of a new Common rail direct injection diesel 2.0 RF-CDT engine and new model codes SKF6 applied for diesel models.
- November 2005: Minor updates include the addition of exterior lighting.
- 2006: The E2000 MWB (SKX0) and E2000 LWB (SKY0) is discontinued in Australia.
- August 2007: 4WD and GL Super trim levels are discontinued.
- August 2010: The New Zealand-market Bongo Brawny, E2000 (LWB), a rebadged Mitsubishi Delica Cargo, was discontinued.
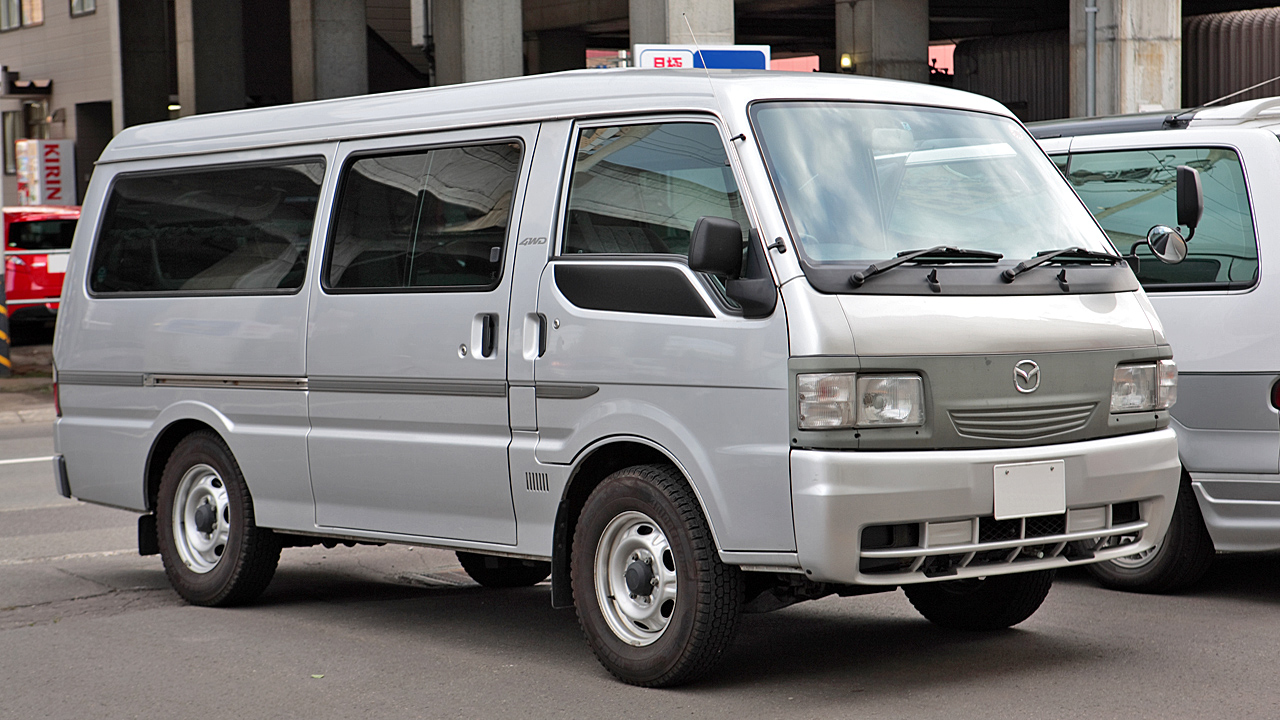
Mazda Bongo Brawny (GL Trim)

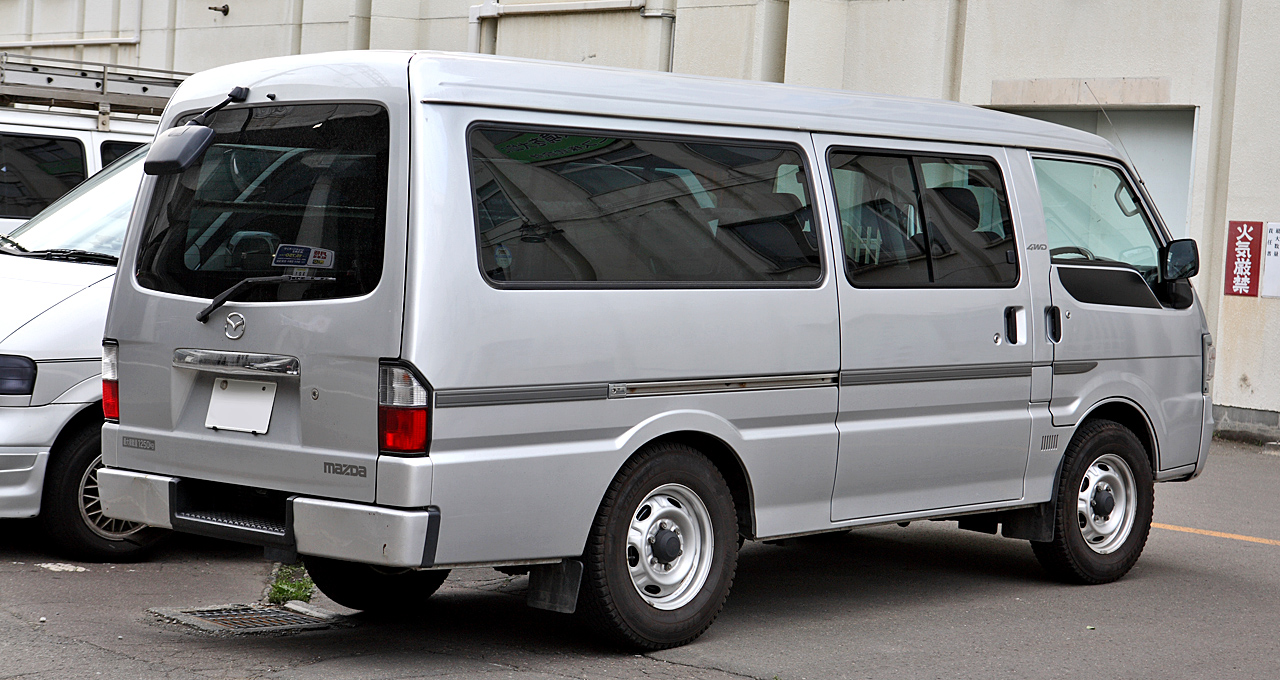
Mazda Bongo Brawny (GL Trim)

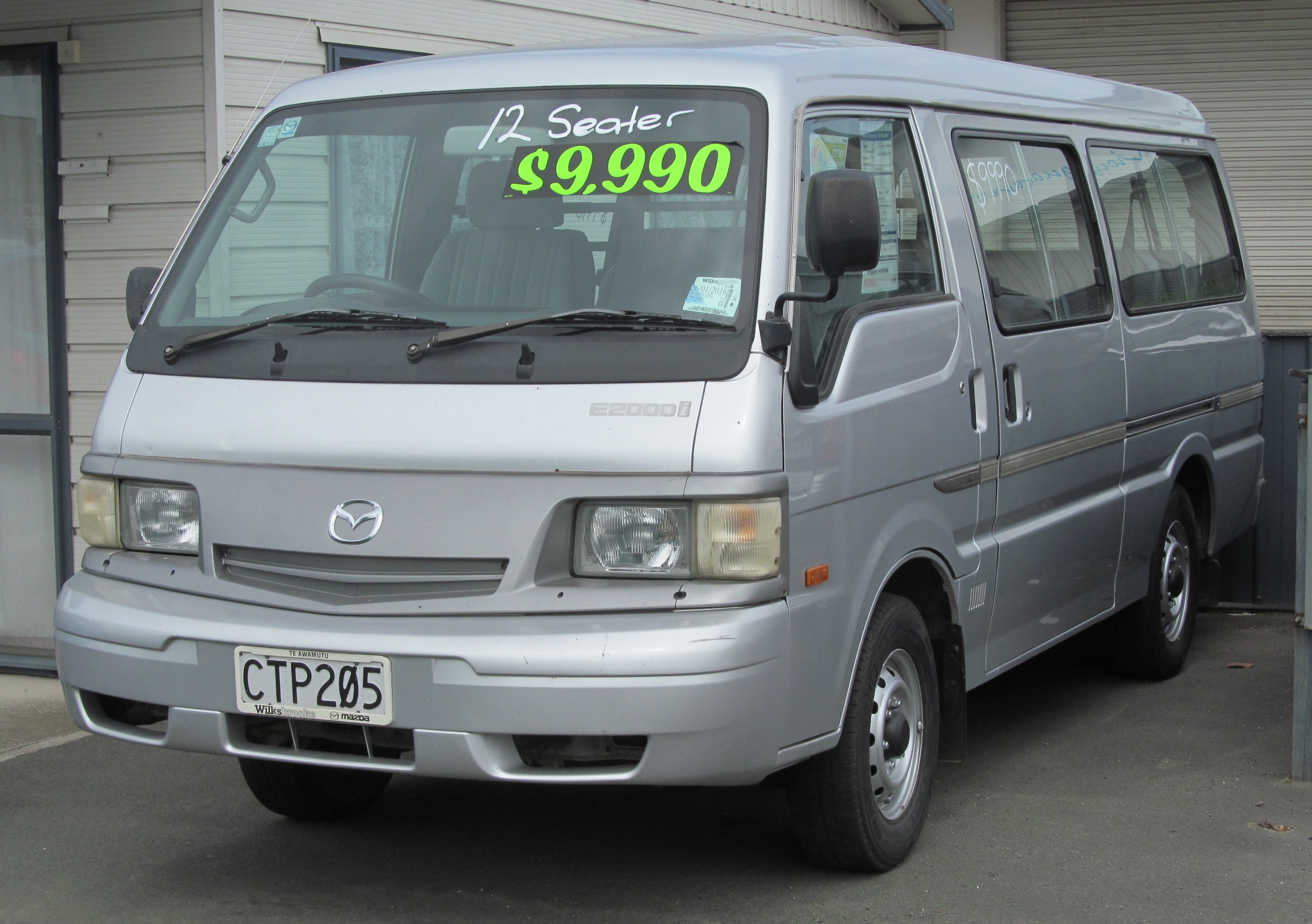
Mazda E2000i (New Zealand)

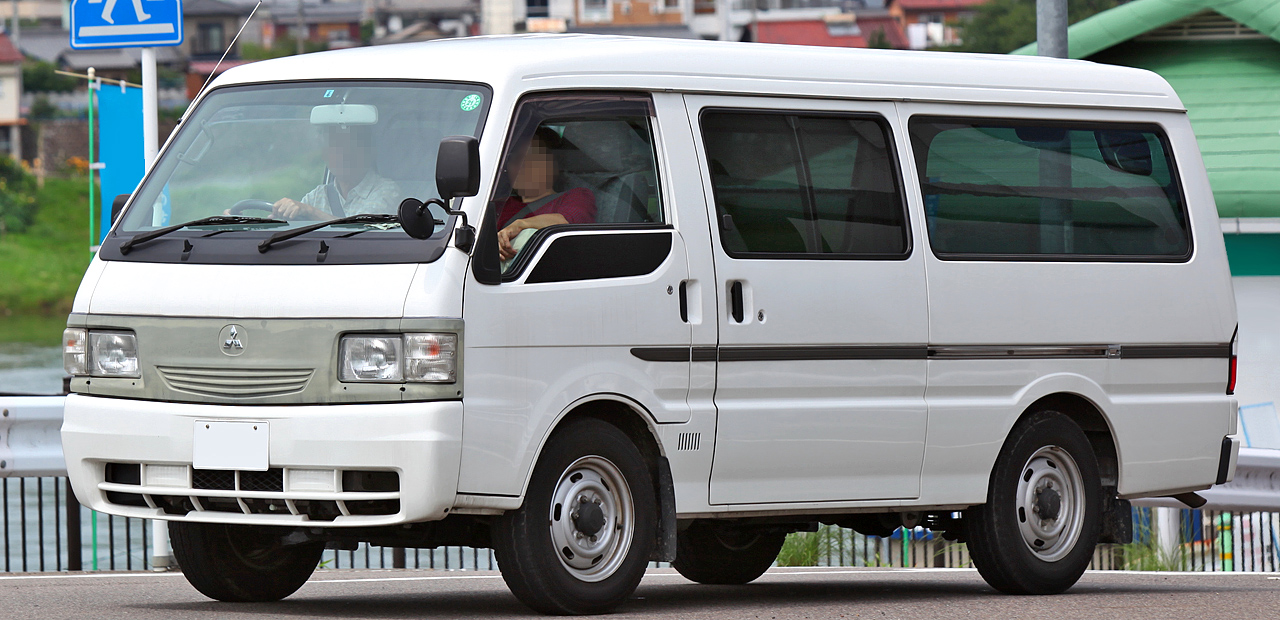
Mitsubishi Delica Cargo (GL Trim)

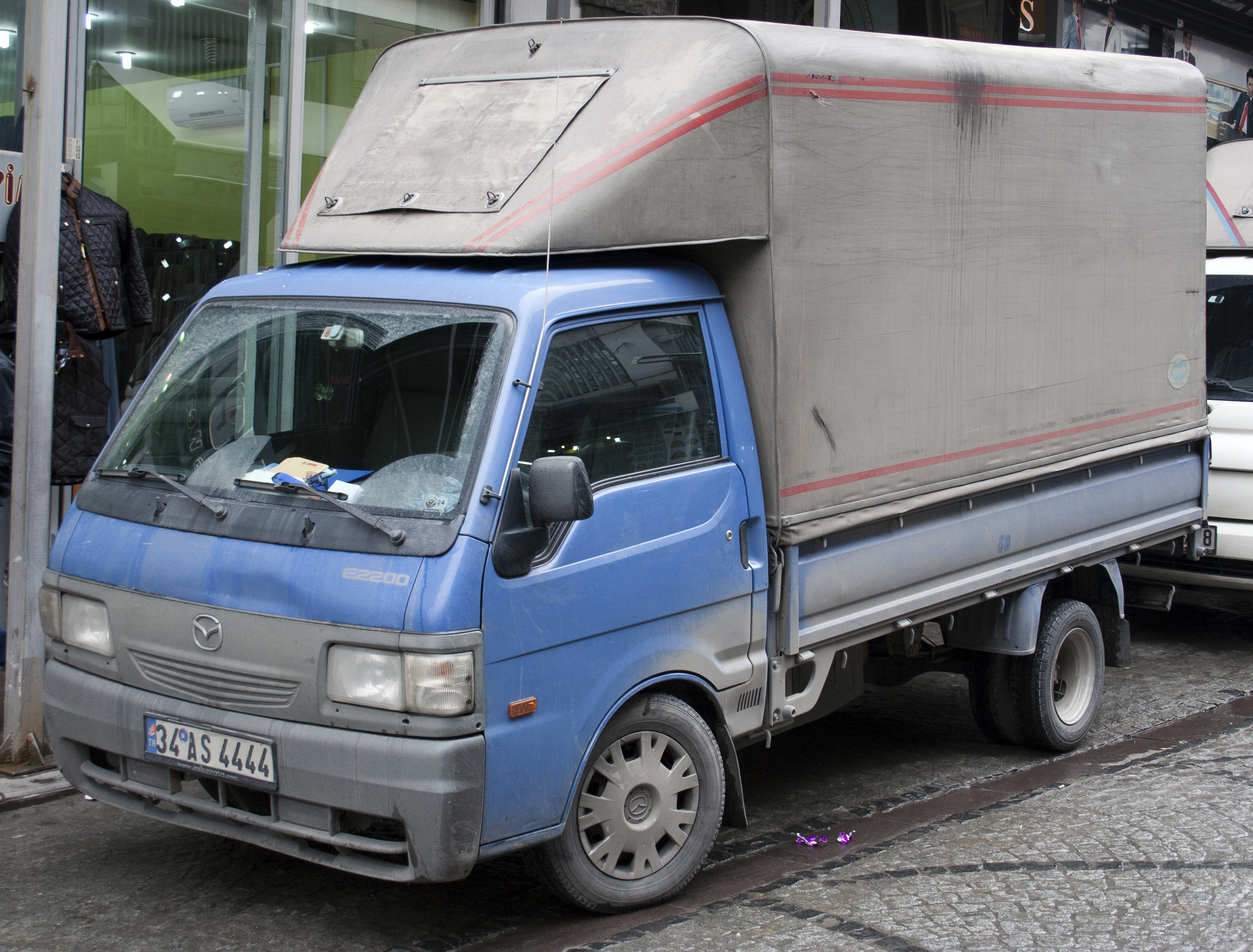
Mazda E2200 truck (Turkey)

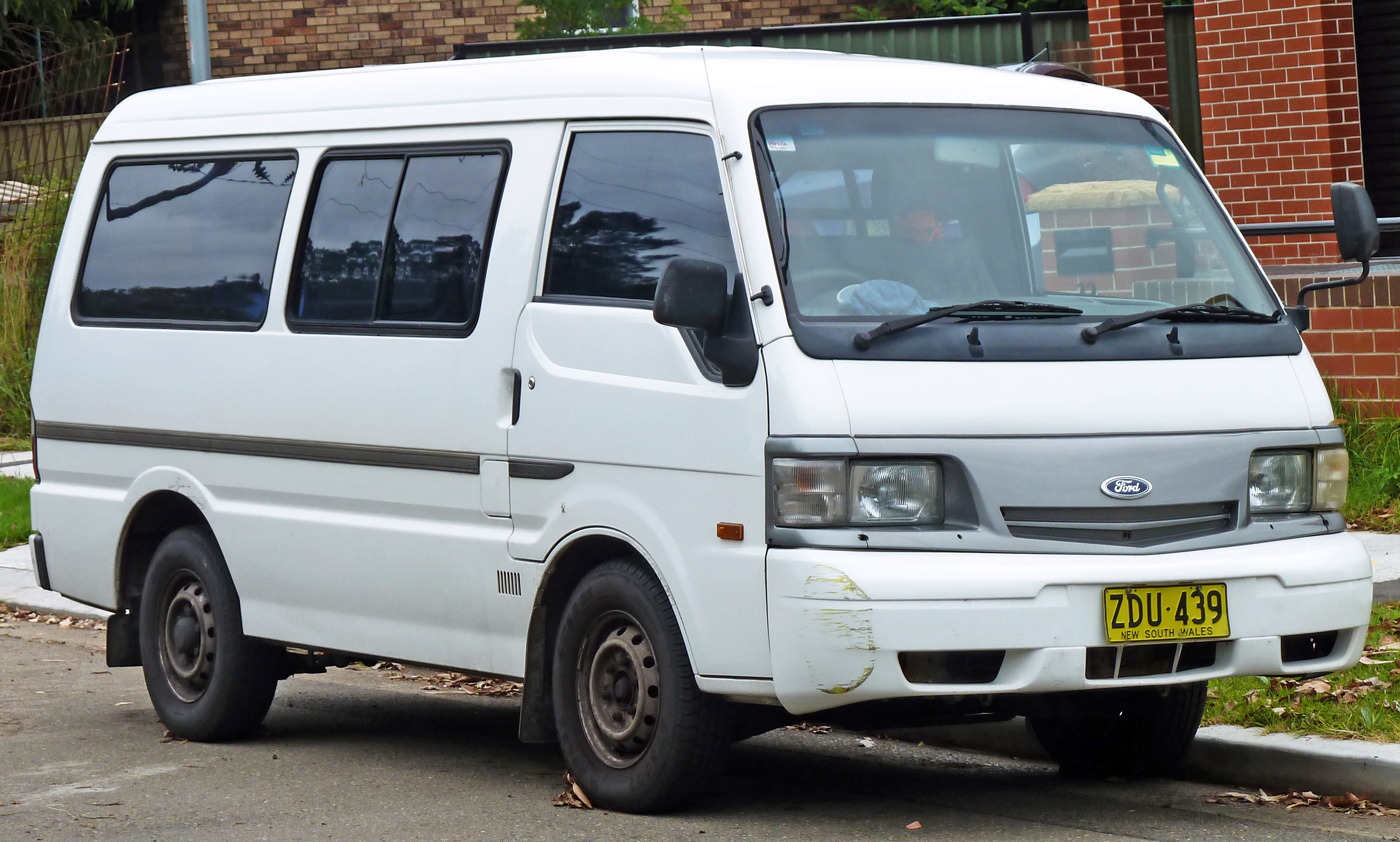
Ford Econovan Maxi (Australia; pre-facelift)

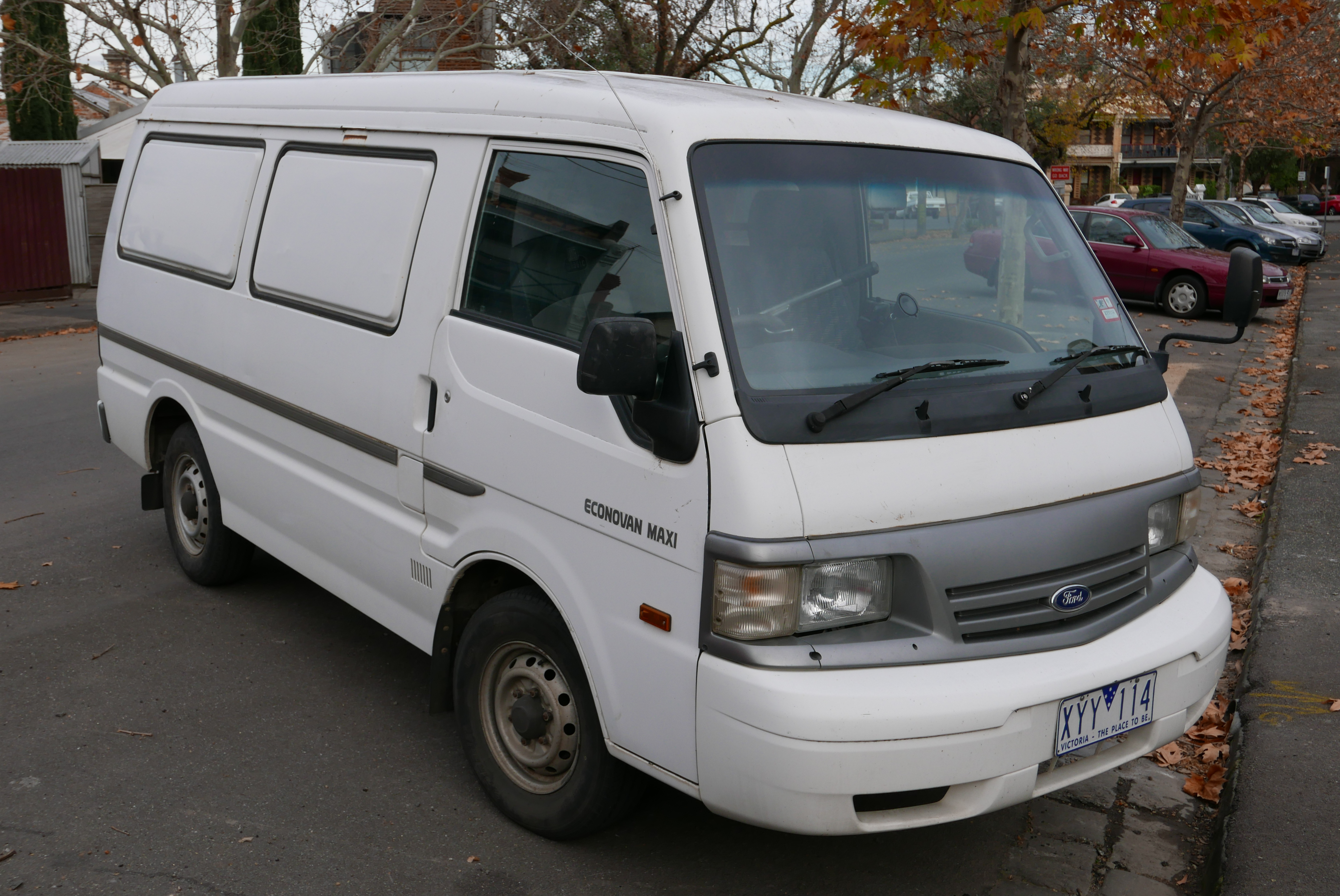
Ford Econovan Maxi (Australia; facelift)

=== Third generation (H200; 2019–present) ===
The Bongo Brawny name was reintroduced in April 2019 in Japan as a badge engineered fifth-generation Toyota HiAce. It was offered in 2 grades: DX, and GL, equivalent with the Toyota RegiusAce. Unlike the previous model, it is intended to be a larger commercial van as opposed to a passenger van.

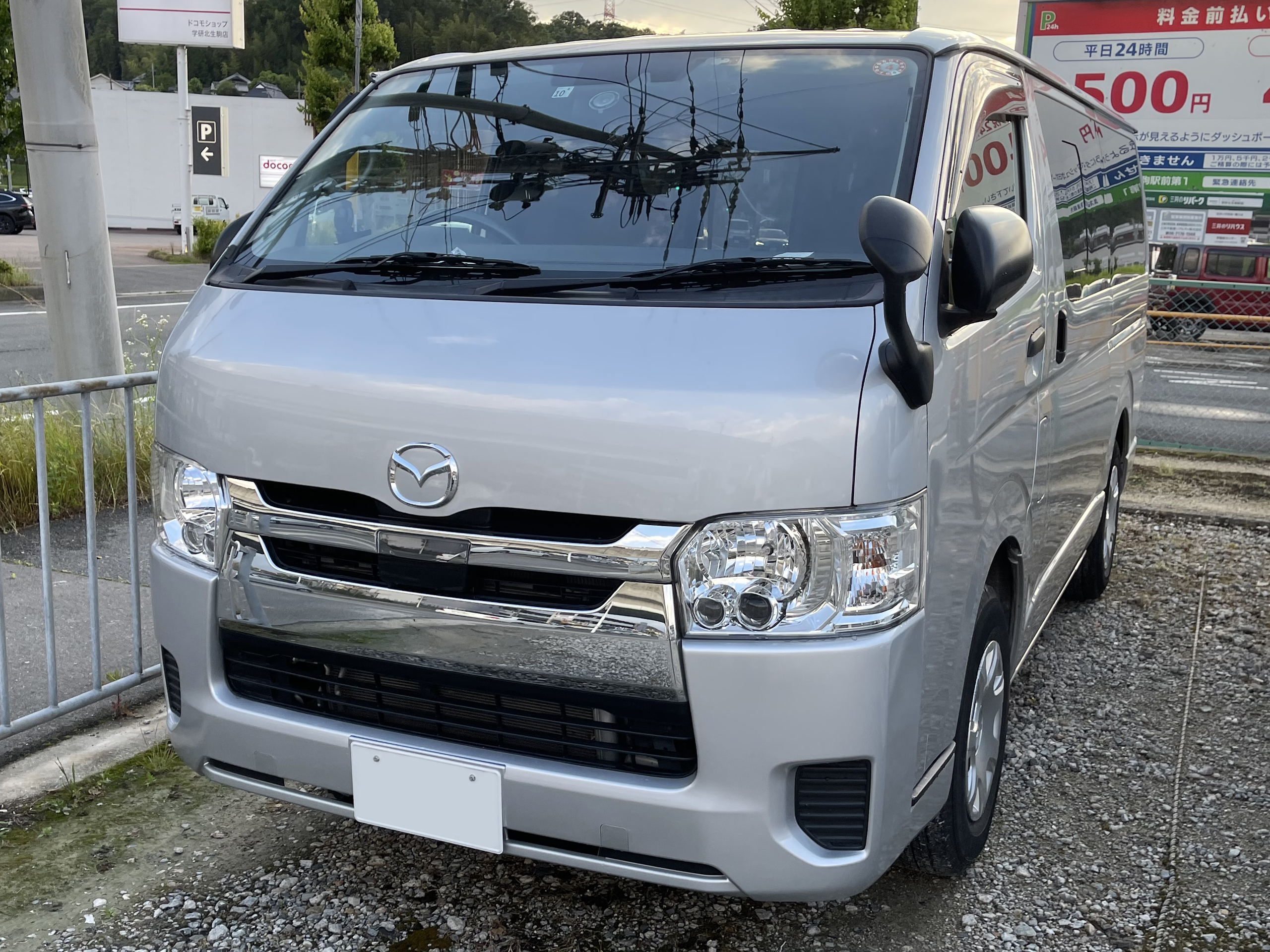
Mazda Bongo Brawny Van GL (TRH200M)

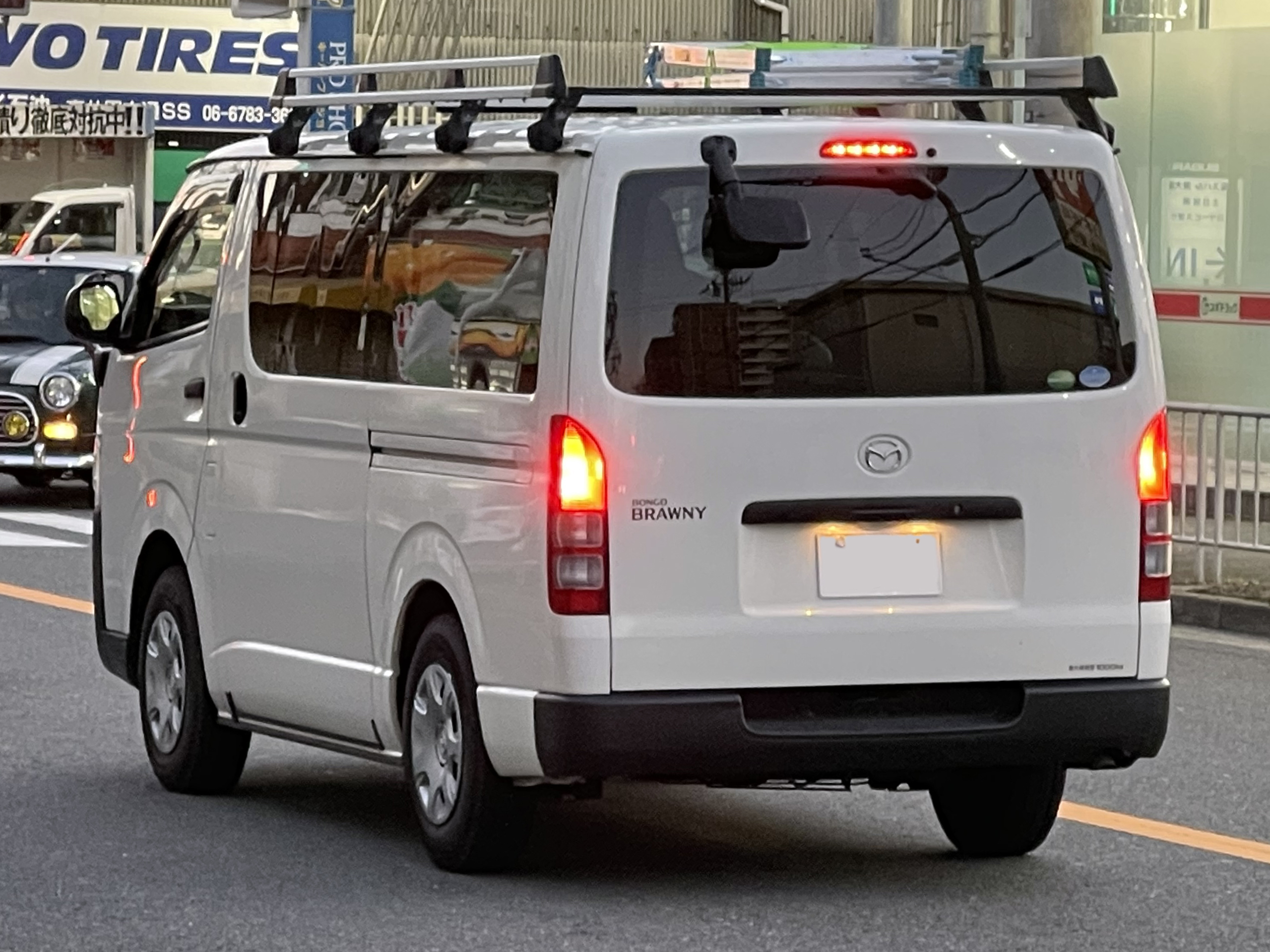
Mazda Bongo Brawny Van DX (TRH200M)

== Bongo Friendee (SG; 1995–2005) ==
Mazda Bongo Friendee
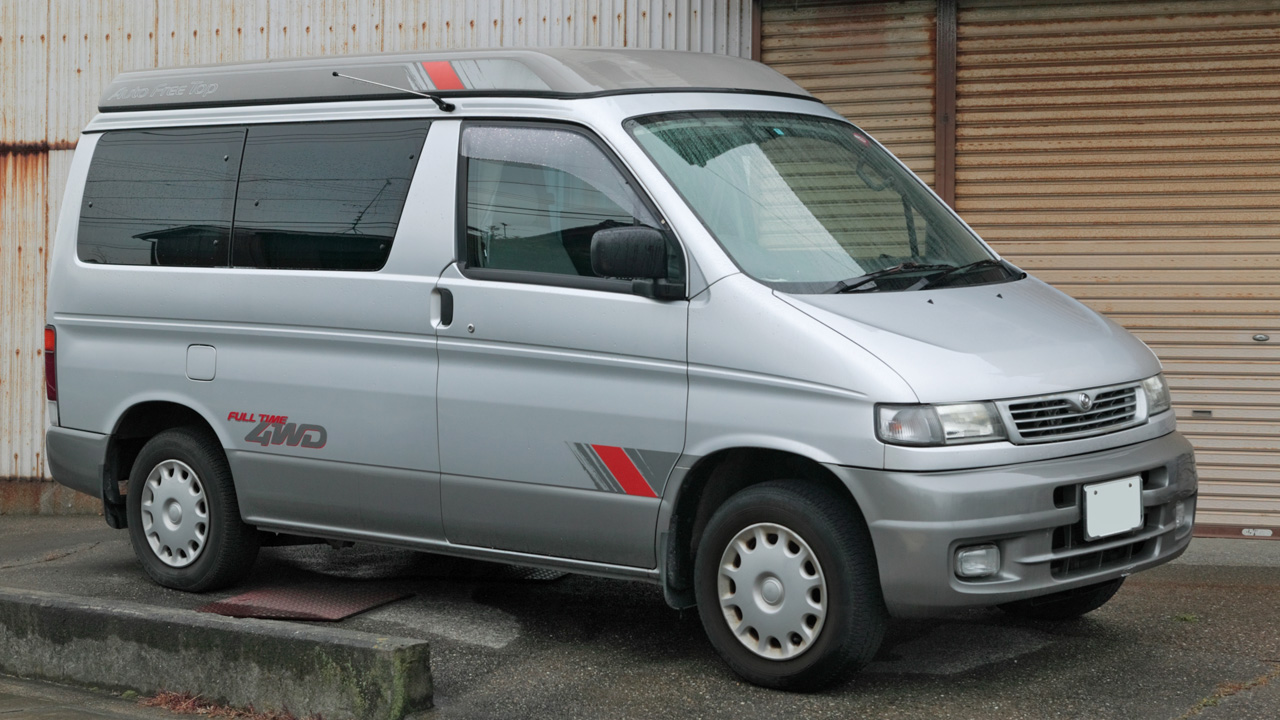
- 1995–1999 Mazda Bongo Friendee

Overview
- Model code: SG
- Also called: Ford Freda
- Production: June 1995–November 2005

Body and chassis
- Body style: 4-door van
- Layout: Front-engine, rear-wheel-drive layout; Front-engine, four-wheel-drive layout
- Platform: Mazda SG platform

Powertrain
- Engine: Petrol: 2.0 L FE SOHC I4; 2.5 L J5 V6; Diesel: 2.5 L WL-T I4
- Transmission: 4-speed automatic; 5-speed manual

Dimensions
- Wheelbase: 115.0 in (2,920 mm)
- Length: 180.5 in (4,585 mm)
- Width: 66.5 in (1,690 mm)
- Height: 77.2–82.3 in (1,960–2,090 mm)
- Kerb weight: 3,527–4,277 lb (1,600–1,940 kg)

The Bongo Friendee was introduced in June 1995, based on the SG platform. It was an eight-seater minivan, and was also sold on the Japanese home market as the Ford Freda.

It was usually, but not exclusively, available with an automatic transmission, and came in 2WD (SGL3), and 4WD (SGL5) versions. The 2.5-litre turbo-diesel was common in Japan, although a 2.5-litre V6 petrol version was available.

The Mazda Bongo Friendee was an eight-seater minivan. Some had Mazda factory-fitted kitchens. Many were imported to the UK, and converted to camper vans. All of them had fold-down seats downstairs to make a double bed, and on many models there was an "Auto Free Top" elevating roof which could sleep two more people. Flat-top versions were also available in Hong Kong, and sold by official dealers.

In February 1999, a facelifted version appeared, with a revised front fascia, redesigned the taillights and different engines, although the 2.5 turbo-diesel continued unchanged.

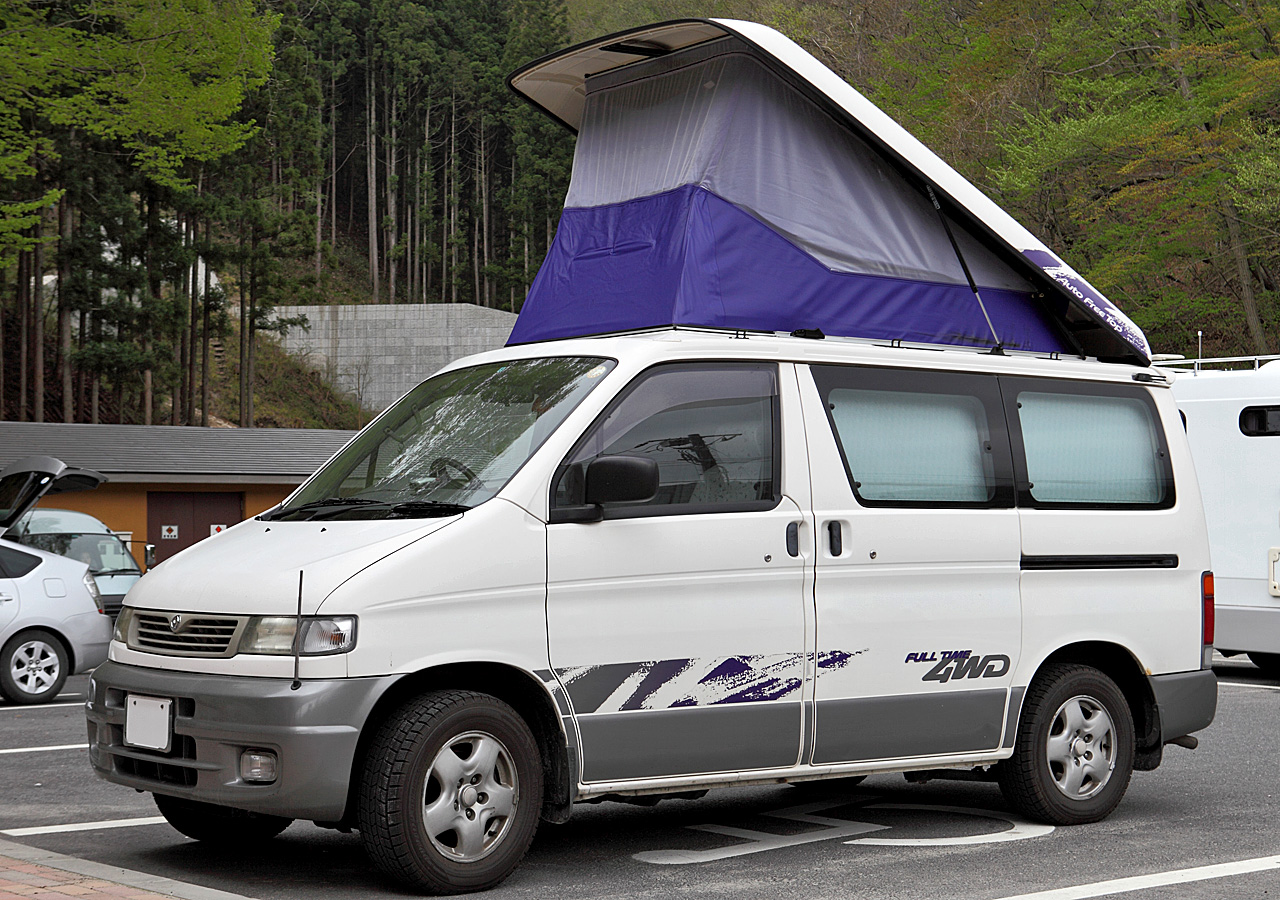
1995–1999 Mazda Bongo Friendee with Auto Free Top

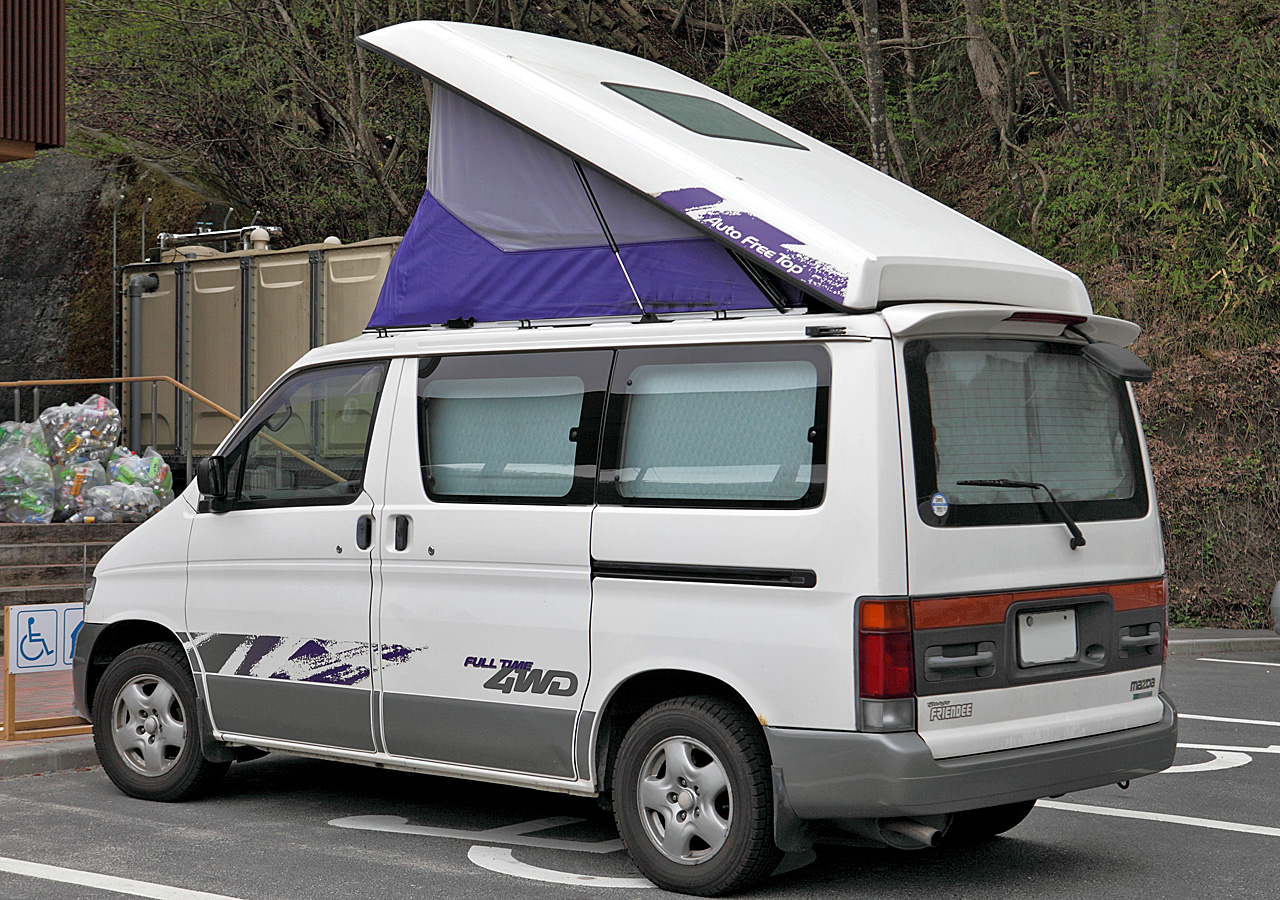
1995–1999 Mazda Bongo Friendee

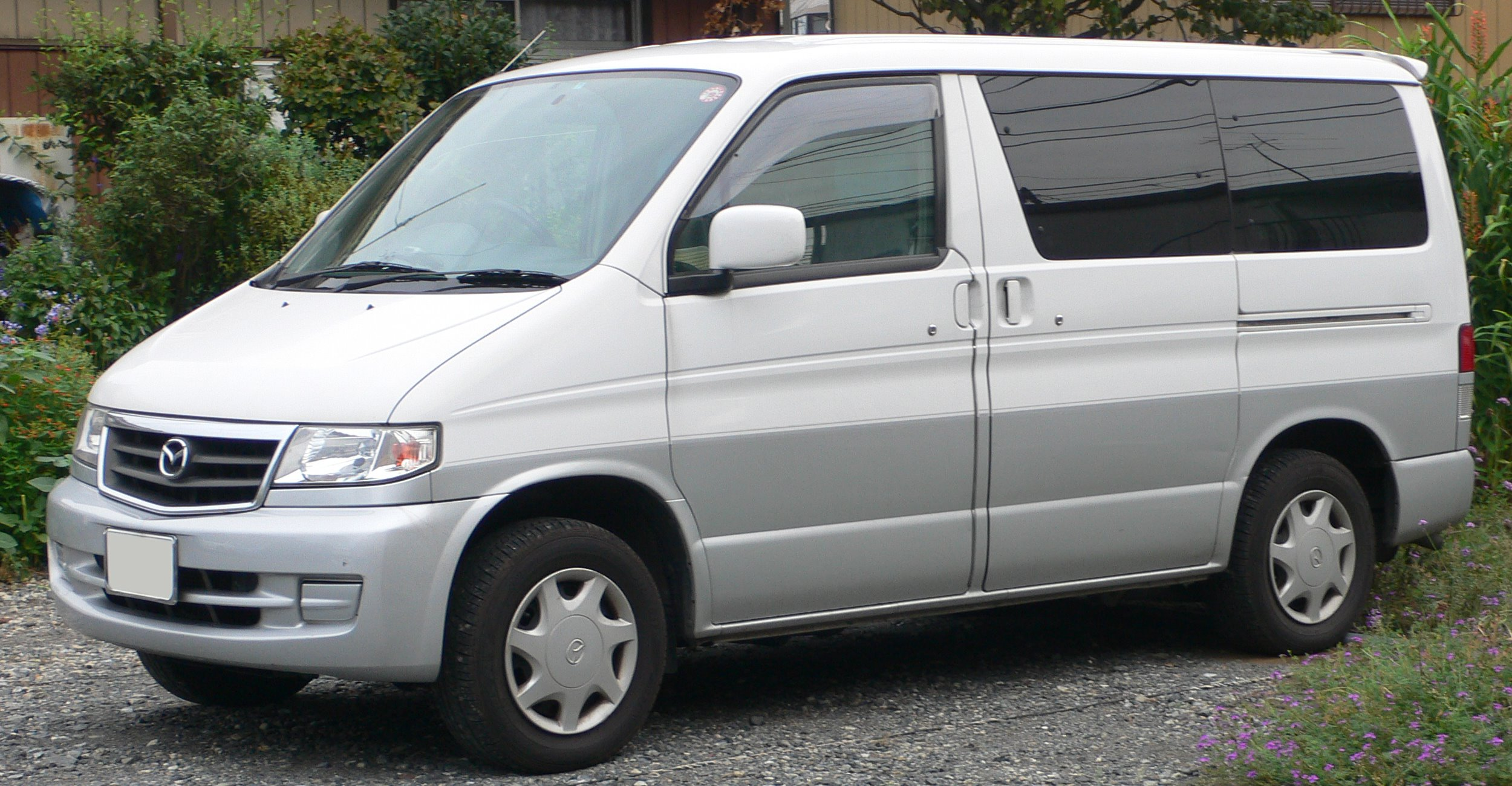
1999–2005 Mazda Bongo Friendee facelift

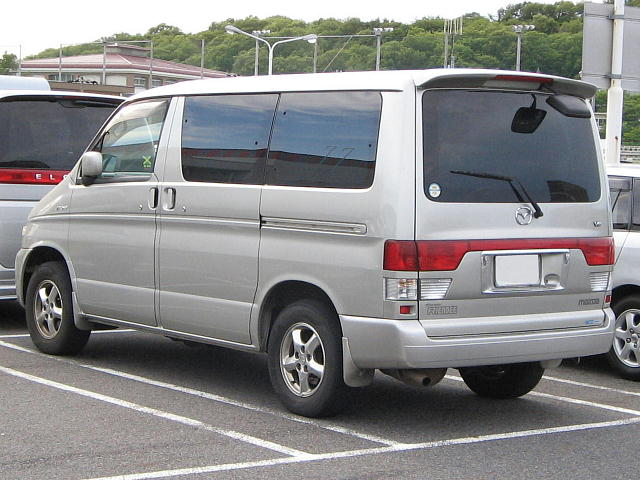
1999–2005 Mazda Bongo Friendee facelift
