= Bongo =

Bongo may refer to:

== Entertainment ==
- Bongo (Australian TV series), on air from August to November 1960
- Bongo Comics, a comic book publishing company
- Bongo (Dragon Ball) or Krillin, a character in Dragon Ball media
- Bongo (Indian TV series), an Indian television drama for children 2004
- Bongo, a character in the Matt Groening comic strip Life in Hell
- Bongo, a dog who played drums in the ITV children's series Animal Kwackers
- Bongo Submarine, a fictional vehicle in the film Star Wars: Episode I – The Phantom Menace
- Bongo, the cartoon ape bouncer from the 1988 film, Who Framed Roger Rabbit
- Bongo, a green kangaroo in the Brazilian series My Big Big Friend
- Bongo Congo, a fictional country that is the setting for the 1960s animated series King Leonardo and His Short Subjects
- "Little Bear Bongo", a 1930 short story for children by Sinclair Lewis
  - Bongo, a segment of the 1947 Disney film Fun and Fancy Free, adapted from the Lewis story

=== Music ===
- Bongo drum, a percussion instrument made up of two small drums attached to each other
- The Bongos, an America pop music band
- Music Man Bongo, a model of bass guitar
- "Bongos" (song), a 2023 song by Cardi B featuring Megan Thee Stallion

== Places ==
- Bongo Country, the name of several places in Africa
- Bongo District, a district in the Upper East Region of Ghana
  - Bongo, Ghana, a town, capital of Bongo District
  - Bongo (Ghana parliament constituency), in Bongo District
- Bongo Gewog, a village in Chukha District, Bhutan
- Bongo, Ivory Coast, a sub-prefecture and commune
- Bongo Island, Sulu Archipelago, Philippines
- Bongo Massif, a mountain range in north-eastern Central African Republic
- Bôngo, alternative name for Bengal (eastern India and Bangladesh)
- Mbongo, Angola, a town in Huambo Province, Angola, often called Bongo
- El Bongo, Panama

== Transportation ==
- Bongo (canoe), typically found in the Hispanic Caribbean regions
- Kia Bongo, an automobile
- Mazda Bongo, a van
- LNER Thompson Class B1, known as 'Bongos' or 'Antelope'

== People ==
- Bongo people (Gabon), a forest people
- Bongo people (South Sudan), an ethnic group in Sudan

=== Names ===
- Bongo (name), a list of people with the surname
- Bongo Herman (born 1941), Jamaican percussionist and singer Herman Davis, active in the early 1960s
- Bongo Joe Coleman (1923–1999), American street musician
- Sketchy Bongo (born 1989), South African record producer, DJ, and songwriter
- Steady Bongo (1966–2024), Sierra Leonean musician and record producer
- Bongo (Numan Athletics), video game character
- Bongo the Bear, an animated anthropomorphic male character from Disney's 1947 film, Fun & Fancy Free

== Other uses ==
- Bongo (antelope), a species of forest antelope from Africa
- Cavanillesia platanifolia, a tree also known as bongo
- Bongo language, the language of the Bongo people of Sudan
- Bongo (software), an open source mail and calendar project
- DK Bongos, a video game controller
- Bongo Jeans/Bongo Apparel, a clothing brand that was acquired by the Iconix Brand Group in 1998
- Operation Bongo II, 1964 Oklahoma City sonic boom tests

== See also ==
- Bongo Bongo Land, a derogatory reference to Third World countries, particularly those in Africa
- Bongo-Bongo (linguistics), used as a name for an imaginary language
- Bonga (disambiguation)
- Bungo (disambiguation)
- Mbongo (disambiguation)
- Um Bongo, a fruit drink marketed at children
- Bong Go, a Filipino politician
- Bongo's Bingo, UK entertainment event
