= Bongo (name) =

Bongo is a surname. Notable people with the name include:

- Ali Bongo (magician) (1929–2009), British comedy magician
- Ali Bongo Ondimba (born 1959), president of Gabon from 2009 to 2023 and son of Omar Bongo
- Amba Bongo, writer and advocate
- Bongani Bongo, South African politician
- Christ Bongo (born 1976), Congolese football striker
- Edith Lucie Bongo (1964–2009), First Lady of Gabon from 1989 to 2009
- Martin Bongo (born 1940), Gabon political figure and diplomat
- Omar Bongo (1935–2009), former president of Gabon
- Pietro Bongo (died 1601), renaissance Italian writer

== See also ==
- Bongo (disambiguation)#People
- Bonga (disambiguation)
- Mbongo (disambiguation)
