= Bungo =

Bungo may refer to:

== Places ==
- Bungo, Angola, a town in Uíge Province, Angola
- Bungo, Luanda, a borough (bairro) of Luanda, Angola
- Bungo Channel or Bungo Strait, between the Japanese islands of Kyushu and Shikoku
- Bungo Province of ancient Japan
- Bungo Suidō Prefectural Natural Park on the shore of Bungo Channel
- Bungo Regency, a regency in Jambi Province, Indonesia
- Bungo Township, Cass County, Minnesota
- Muara Bungo, a city in Jambi Province, Indonesia
- Lungué Bungo River or Lungwebungu River, in Angola and Zambia, tributary of the Zambesi
- Strathbungo, an old village in Scotland, now engulfed by Glasgow

== People and characters ==
- Bungo Fukusaki (1959–), professional shogi player
- Bungo Shirai (1928–2024), president of the Chunichi Shimbun and owner of the Chunichi Dragons
- Bungo Tsuda (1918–2007), Japanese politician
- Bungo Yoshida (1934–2008), Japanese puppeteer, modernizer of bunraku
- Leka Bungo (1944–2025), Albanian director, actor, and screenwriter
- Bungo, a commonly used nickname for Julian Byng, 1st Viscount Byng of Vimy
- Bungo, a character in the Wombles novels by Elisabeth Beresford
- Bungo, a character in the children's television series Jungle Junction

== Other ==
- Bungo (fruit) (Saba comorensis), a fruit from Tanzania
- Bungo (Japanese language), the literary Japanese language
- JDS Bungo (MST-464), a ship of the Japanese navy
- PS Bungo or Persibut Bungo, an Indonesian soccer team
- Bungo Stray Dogs, a Japanese manga series by Kafka Asagiri and Sango Harukawa
- Bungo (manga), a Japanese manga series by Yūji Ninomiya

== See also ==
- Bongo (disambiguation)
