= Bonga (disambiguation) =

Bonga is a town in Ethiopia.

Bonga may also refer to:

== People ==
- Bonga (given name)
- Bonga (surname)

== Places ==
- Bonga (Tanzanian ward)
- Bonga, Burkina Faso
- Bonga, Vologda Oblast, Russia
- Bonga Field, an oil field in Nigeria

== Other uses ==
- A spirit or god in the religion of the Santal people
- Ethmalosa fimbriata, common name Bonga shad or simply Bonga

== See also ==
- Sing-Bonga, sun god of the Birhor people
- Bongo (disambiguation)
