= UV Express =

License to operate utility vehicles for public transport in the Philippines

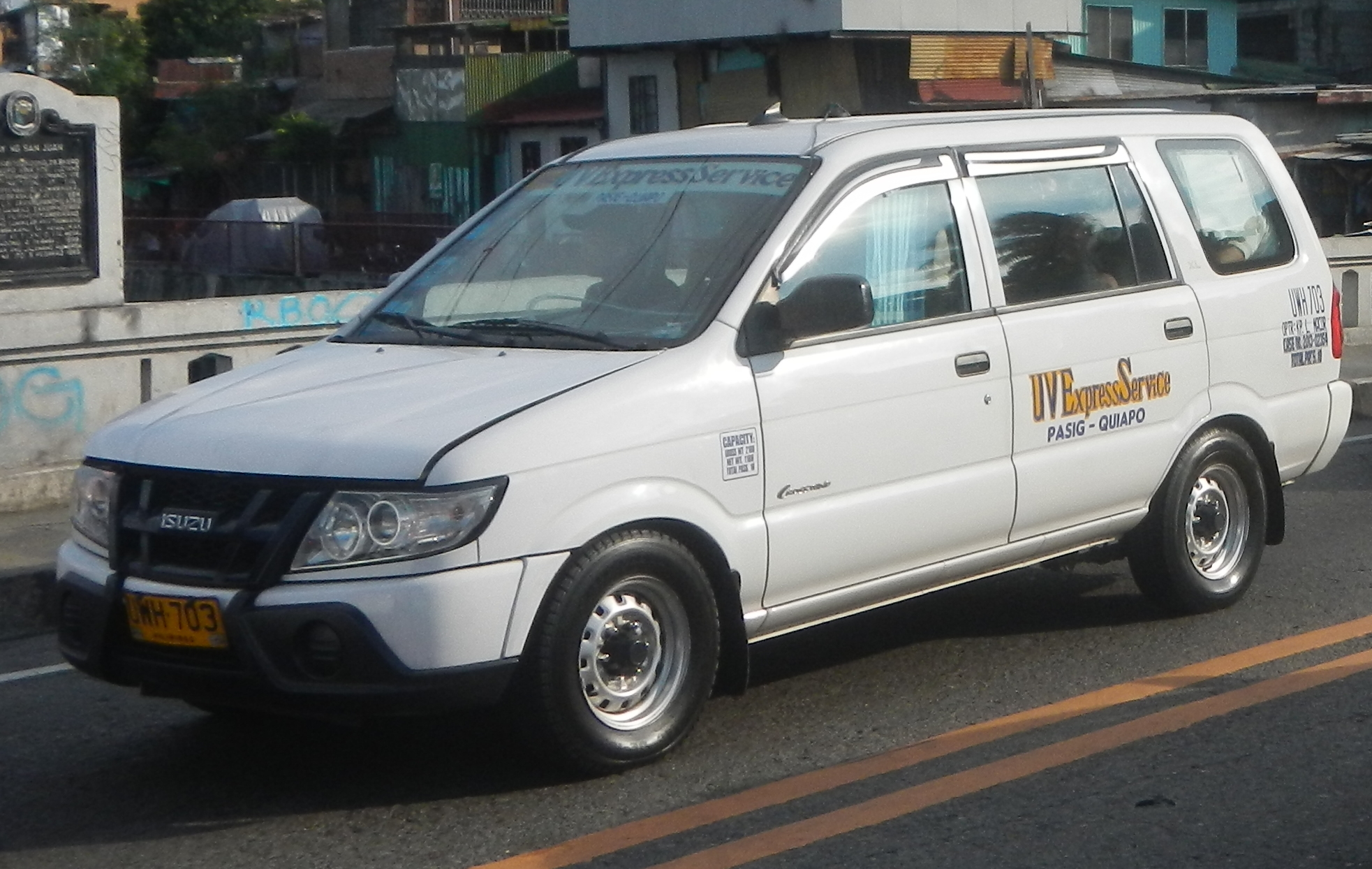
An Isuzu Crosswind being used as an UV Express vehicle

Utility Vehicle (UV) Express (formerly known as FX, Metered Taxi, and GT or Garage-to-Terminal Express) is a license to operate utility vehicles, particularly vans, as an alternative mode of public transport in the Philippines. The term also refers to the vehicles. This is one of the two types of share taxi services in the Philippines along with the bus-like jeepney.

== History ==
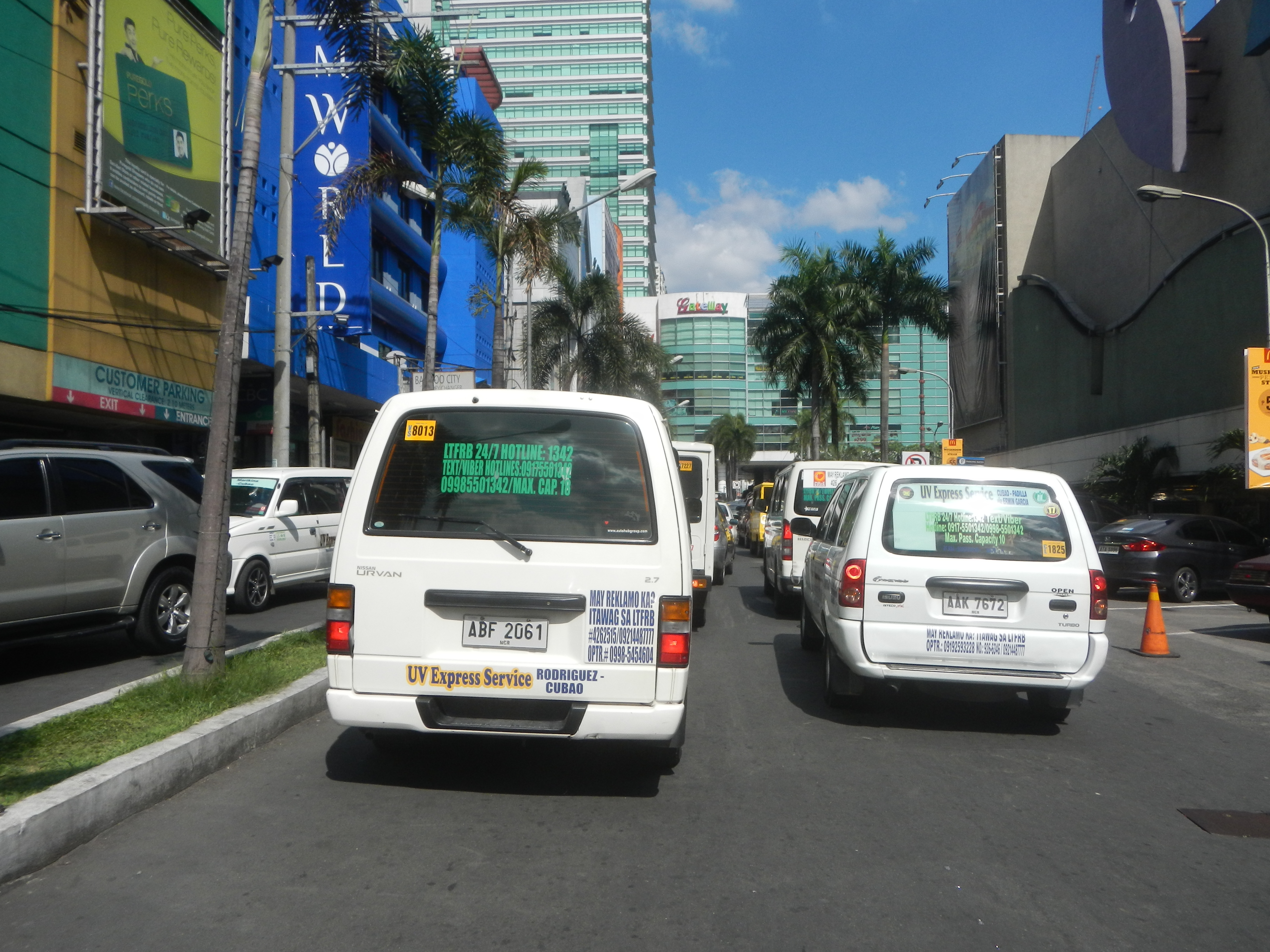
The two kinds of UV Express Vehicles: A van-based UV Express (Left: Nissan Urvan) and an MPV-based UV Express (Right: Isuzu Crosswind)

In 1993, Toyota Motor Philippines introduced the third generation Tamaraw FX. This vehicle was designed and marketed as a smaller type of utility vehicle. The Tamaraw FX could seat a driver and one passenger in front, three passengers in the second row, leaving a relatively large space for luggage. This luggage space was traditionally used to provide additional seating space, producing limited legroom. This vehicle, as well as comparable offerings from makers such as Mitsubishi Adventure, Isuzu Hi-Lander/Crosswind and in rarer instances, the Toyota Innova, would eventually be used in public transport, colloquially referred to as the "FX".

Over time, the FX was replaced by larger vehicles such as the Nissan Urvan, Hyundai Starex, Hyundai Grace, Kia Pregio, Kia Besta, Mitsubishi L300, Isuzu NHR i-Van, Foton View Transvan, and Toyota HiAce. These vehicles removed the luggage space to add seating space, with the same limited legroom as the first ones.

As part of the Public Utility Vehicle Modernization Program, A new type of vehicle was introduced for the UV Express service, the Class 3 Modern PUV. Such minibuses are required to carry 23 or more passengers in forward facing seats, must feature an onboard CCTV, GPS, and a Euro 4 engine, and conform to the PNS 2126:2017 dimension standards.

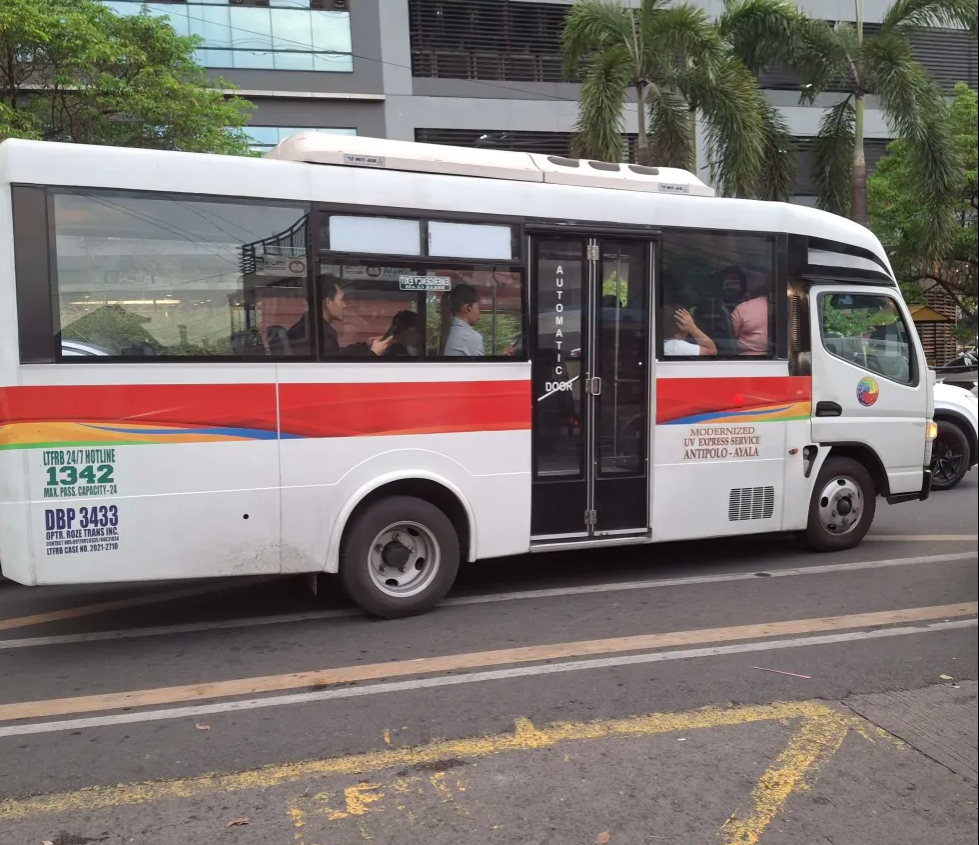
A Fuso Canter Modern PUV used as a UV Express, on the Antipolo - Ayala service

== Public transport model ==
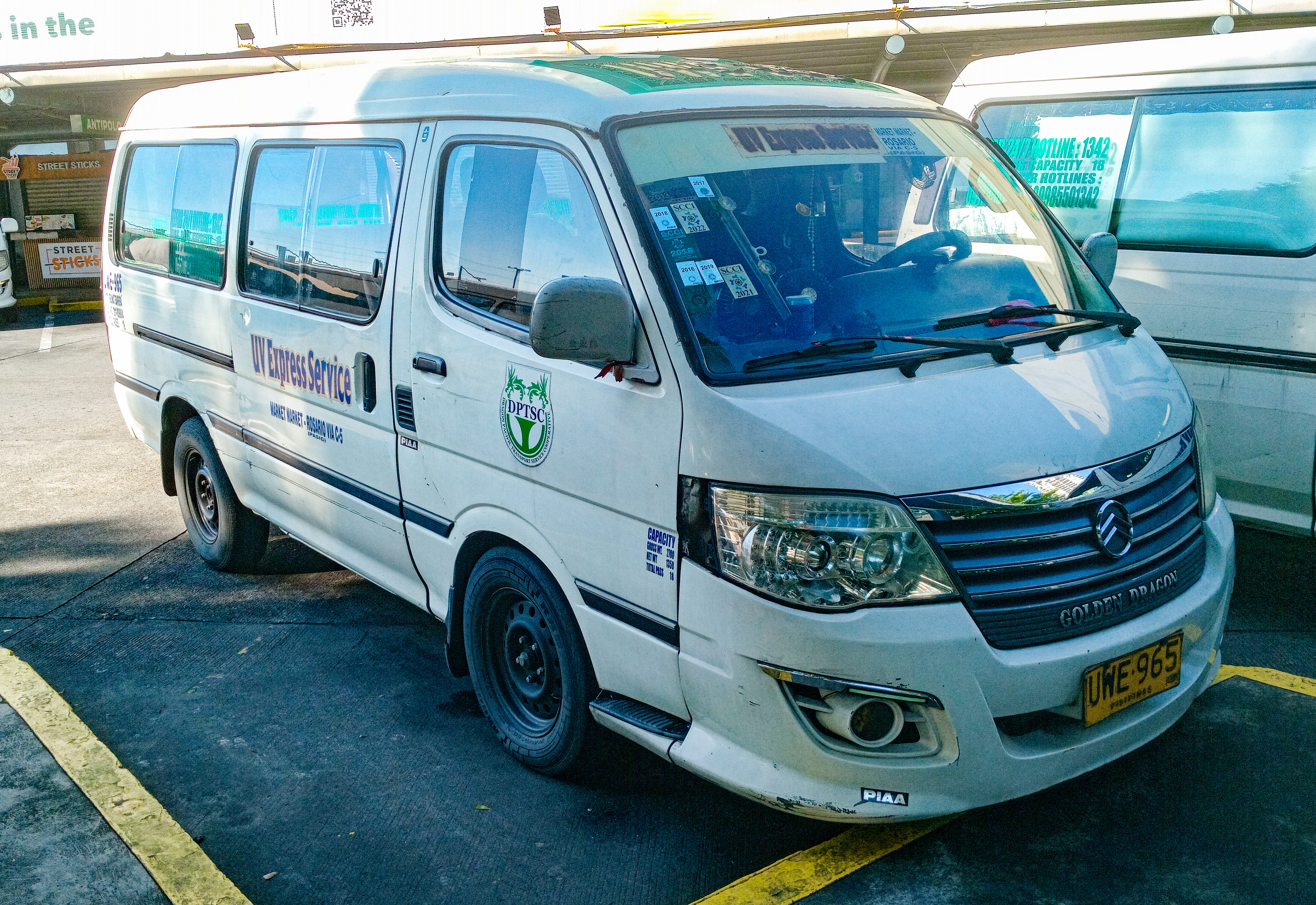
2012 Golden Dragon Haise V4 being used as an UV Express vehicle

A UV Express terminal (see white vans in left foreground) parked at TriNoma.

UV Express follows the franchisee model and has more than 120 services in the Philippines including the National Capital region. The country's Land Transportation Franchising and Regulatory Board serves as the owner of the franchise.

UV Express vans and compact MPVs are air conditioned, usually seat 10–18 passengers (sometimes there are rare vans that seat about 25). As of 2024, traditional UV Express charge ₱2.40 per kilometer while modern UV Express charge ₱2.50 per kilometer and are subject to a 20 percent discount for students, the elderly, and persons with disability. In Metro Manila, they have their own passenger terminals, mostly stops at central business districts.

As part of the government’s Public Utility Vehicle Modernization Program, most of the UV Express fleets have consolidated to become a member or to form a Transport Cooperative in which they are regulated by the Office of Transportation Cooperatives, LTFRB, and Cooperative Development Authority.

=== Fleet ===
List of fleets that are used as traditional UV Express vehicles:

- Nissan Urvan Shuttle/VX/XXI
- Nissan NV350 Urvan Standard/Cargo/Premium
- Mitsubishi L300 Versa Van and FB
- Toyota Hiace Commuter/Commuter Deluxe/GL Grandia
- Hyundai Starex/Grand Starex
- Hyundai Staria
- Isuzu NHR i-VAN/NHR-PV/FlexiTruck
- Hyundai Grace
- Kia Besta
- Kia Pregio
- Asia Topic
- Kia K2700 Panoramic/K2500 Karga
- Isuzu Hi-Lander
- Isuzu Crosswind XT, XL, and XS variants
- Mitsubishi Adventure GX, GLX, and GLS Sport variants
- Foton View Limited/Transvan/Transvan HR/Traveller/Traveller XL
- Golden Dragon Sapphire
- King Long Univan
- Joylong Majestic
- Isuzu Traviz Utility Van
- Foton Harabas TM300 Utility Van
- Toyota Tamaraw FX/Revo
- Toyota Innova J variant
- Isuzu Fargo

List of vehicles that are used as Modern UV Express vehicles:

- Hino 300 (XZU342LN)
- Isuzu QKR77
- Isuzu NLR77
- Canter Express
- JMC CoStar
- Foton Tornado (F-Jeepney M5.2C)
