= Riviel =

Ecuadorian legend

The riviel is an Ecuadorian legend. It is prevalent among the Afro-Ecuadorian communities of the Pacific province of Esmeraldas.

The riviel is a spirit that travels at night along the rivers, causing fright to the unfortunate individuals who cross its path. It typically travels aboard a bongo canoe in the shape of a coffin, carrying a cross that serves as a paddle and a lamp that is affixed to the prow of the boat. The riviel likes to scare its victims and sneaks up on them, causing them to fall in the water where it plunges in with them with the intention of drowning them. All these evils are celebrated with malicious laughter.

To avoid being approached, travellers at nighttime usually carry in their canoes various fishing implements such as nets, hooks and harpoons which serve as amulets and repellents against the vision. They must also avoid fishing alone or travelling alone on the water, especially at night.

In one variant, the riviel often appears as a handsome young man who parties, sings and dances in the marimba dances of Afro-descendants. The intruder is only discovered when little green lights come out of his ankles as he is dancing. Terror spreads among the audience and spoils the merriment, but the old people advise that to get rid of its presence, the assembly must shout: Cast net! Harpoon! Hammock! Hook! and the names of other gadgets for fishing. Another effective repellent is a prayer called La Magnifica.
