= Fun and Fancy Free =

1947 Disney film

- Original theatrical release poster
- Directed by: Jack Kinney (animation); Bill Roberts (animation); Hamilton Luske (animation); William Morgan (live action)
- Story by: Homer Brightman; Eldon Dedini; Lance Nolley; Tom Oreb; Harry Reeves; Ted Sears
- Based on: "Little Bear Bongo" by: Sinclair Lewis (Bongo); "Jack and the Beanstalk" (Mickey and the Beanstalk)
- Produced by: Walt Disney
- Starring: Edgar Bergen; Dinah Shore
- Edited by: Jack Bachom
- Music by: Oliver Wallace; Paul Smith; Eliot Daniel; Charles Wolcott
- Production company: Walt Disney Productions
- Distributed by: RKO Radio Pictures
- Release date: September 27, 1947
- Running time: 73 minutes
- Country: United States
- Language: English
- Box office: $3.165 million (worldwide rentals)

Fun and Fancy Free, formerly known as Fun & Fancy Free, is a 1947 American animated musical fantasy film produced by Walt Disney and Ben Sharpsteen and released on September 27, 1947, by RKO Radio Pictures. The film is a compilation of two stories: Bongo, narrated by Dinah Shore and loosely based on the short story "Little Bear Bongo" by Sinclair Lewis; and Mickey and the Beanstalk, narrated by Edgar Bergen and based on the "Jack and the Beanstalk" fairy tale. Though the film is primarily animated, it also uses live-action segments starring Bergen to join its two stories.

== Plot ==
Jiminy Cricket appears inside a large house, exploring and singing "I'm a Happy-Go-Lucky Fellow" until he comes across a doll, a teddy bear, and a record player. Among the records, he finds one titled Bongo, a musical romance story narrated by Dinah Shore. While he doesn't know the narrator, he still decides to play it.

=== Bongo ===
The story follows Bongo, a circus bear who longs for freedom. Though celebrated in the circus ring, he is mistreated offstage. While traveling by circus train, he acts on his instincts and escapes into the wild. Initially optimistic about his new life, Bongo quickly realizes the harsh realities of the North American wilderness.

The next morning, Bongo meets a female bear named Lulubelle, and the two fall in love. However, a burly rogue bear named Lumpjaw misinterprets Lulubelle's playful slap as affection and claims her for himself. Bongo later learns that slapping is the bears' way of showing love and returns to challenge Lumpjaw. After a fierce fight ending in a plunge down a waterfall, Lumpjaw is swept away, and Bongo and Lulubelle are happily united.

After the story ends, Jiminy notices an invitation to a birthday party for Luana Patten at the house across the street. He hops over and quietly joins the festivities, where Charlie McCarthy, Mortimer Snerd, and Edgar Bergen entertain Luana. Edgar decides to tell a story.

=== Mickey and the Beanstalk ===
In a parody of Jack and the Beanstalk, the kingdom of Happy Valley, sustained by a singing golden harp, falls into despair when the harp is stolen. The story focuses on three poor farmers — Mickey, Donald, and Goofy — are down to a single loaf of bread and one bean. Driven mad by hunger, Donald nearly kills their pet cow, prompting Mickey to trade the cow for "magic beans". Enraged and thinking that Mickey had been defrauded, Donald throws the beans and they fall into a hole in the floor. Overnight, the beans, which turn out to be truly magical after all, sprout into a gigantic beanstalk that lifts their house to the sky.

The next morning, the trio find themselves in a giant land above the clouds. They sneak into a castle where they discover a table of food. While the friends feast, they find the golden harp, who reveals that she was kidnapped by Willie the Giant. Willie appears, showing off his powers of flight, invisibility, and shapeshifting. When Mickey sneezes inside Willie's sandwich, he is caught. Pretending to be a fortune-teller, Mickey tries to trick Willie into becoming a fly but fails when Willie transforms into a bunny instead. He catches Mickey, Donald, and Goofy, locking them in the harp's chest in retaliation while taking the harp out. Mickey manages to escape and the harp sings Willie to sleep. As he tries to get the key for the chest, Mickey accidentally falls into a box of snuff and sneezes, almost waking the giant. The giant sneezes and falls asleep as Mickey climbs up the shelf and frees Donald and Goofy.

The trio flees with the harp, but Willie awakens and chases them down the beanstalk. Mickey stalls Willie long enough for Donald and Goofy to cut the beanstalk, causing Willie to fall to his presumed death.

Back at Edgar Bergen's home, he concludes the tale by explaining that the return of the harp restored happiness to Happy Valley. Mortimer mourns Willie's fate, but just as Edgar reassures him that Willie is fictional, the giant appears in Hollywood, having survived the fall, and inquires about the whereabouts of Mickey. Upon seeing Willie, Edgar faints from shock while Mortimer tells Willie goodnight. The film ends with Jiminy Cricket leaving the house as Willie continues his search.

== Cast ==
- Edgar Bergen – himself, Charlie McCarthy, and Mortimer Snerd
- Luana Patten – herself
- Dinah Shore – singer, the narrator, and Lulubelle
- Jimmy MacDonald – Lumpjaw, Chip 'n' Dale
- Cliff Edwards – Jiminy Cricket
- Walt Disney – Mickey Mouse
- Clarence Nash – Donald Duck
- Pinto Colvig – Goofy, Bongo the Bear
- Billy Gilbert – Willie the Giant
- Anita Gordon – The Golden Harp

== Production ==
During the 1940s, Mickey and the Beanstalk and Bongo were originally going to be developed as two separate feature films.

In the late 1930s, Mickey's popularity fell behind Donald Duck, Goofy, Pluto, Max Fleischer's Popeye and Warner Bros.' Porky Pig. To boost his popularity, Disney and his artists created cartoons such as "Brave Little Tailor" and "The Sorcerer's Apprentice", the latter of which was later included in Fantasia (1940). In early 1940, during production on Fantasia, animators Bill Cottrell and T. Hee had pitched the idea of a feature film based on Jack and the Beanstalk starring Mickey Mouse as Jack and with Donald Duck and Goofy as supporting characters. When they pitched it to Disney, he "burst out laughing with tears rolling down his cheeks with joy", as Cottrell and Hee later recalled. Disney enjoyed the pitch so much he invited other employees to listen to it. However, he said that, as much as he enjoyed the pitch of the film, the film itself would never go into production, because, as Disney claimed, they "murdered [his] characters". However, Cottrell and Hee were able to talk Disney into giving it the green-light and story development as The Legend of Happy Valley, which began production on May 2, 1940.

The story was handed to Frank Tashlin after developmental hurdles, who finished the story treatment in a more efficient manner and ahead of schedule, much to Disney's pleasure. In an interview with historian Michael Barrier, Tashlin noted that Disney tried to modify the story, but decided to use the original story treatment in the final film. Tashlin was not credited due to his extensive involvement in the Disney animators' strike. However, there were a few deleted scenes. For example, there was a scene in which Mickey took the cow to market where he meets Honest John and Gideon from Pinocchio who con him into trading his cow for the "magic beans". Another version had a scene where Mickey gave the cow to the Queen (played by Minnie Mouse) as a gift, and in return she gave him the magic beans. However, both scenes were cut when the story was trimmed for Fun and Fancy Free and the film does not explain how Mickey got the beans.

Shortly after the rough animation on Dumbo was complete in May 1941, The Legend of Happy Valley went into production, using many of the same animation crew, although RKO doubted it would be a success. Since it was a simple, low-budget film, in six months, fifty minutes had been animated on Happy Valley. Then on October 27, 1941, due to the Disney animators' strike and World War II which had cut off Disney's foreign release market caused serious debts so Disney put The Legend of Happy Valley on hold.

Meanwhile, production was starting on Bongo, a film based on the short story written by Sinclair Lewis for Cosmopolitan magazine in 1930. It was suggested that Bongo could be a sequel to Dumbo and some of the cast from the 1941 film would appear as supporting characters; however, the idea never fully materialized. In earlier drafts, Bongo had a chimpanzee as a friend and partner in his circus act. She was first called "Beverly" then "Chimpy", but the character was ultimately dropped when condensing the story. Bongo and Chimpy also encountered two mischievous bear cubs who were dropped. Originally, the designs for the characters were more realistic, but when paired for Fun and Fancy Free the designs were simplified and drawn more cartoony. The script was nearly completed by December 8, 1941, the day after the attack on Pearl Harbor.

On that same day, the United States military took control of the studio and commissioned Walt Disney Productions to produce instructional and war propaganda films in which pre-production work on Bongo and early versions of Alice in Wonderland and Peter Pan were shelved. During and after the war, Disney stopped producing single narrative feature films due to costs and decided to make package films consisting of animated shorts to make feature films. He did this with Saludos Amigos and The Three Caballeros and continued after the war until he had enough money to make a single narrative feature again.

Disney felt that since the animation of Bongo and The Legend of Happy Valley (which had been renamed Mickey and the Beanstalk) was not sophisticated enough to be a Disney animated feature film, the artists decided to include the story in a package film. Throughout the 1940s, Disney had suggested to pair Mickey and the Beanstalk with The Wind in the Willows (which was in production around this time) into a package film tentatively titled Two Fabulous Characters. Ultimately, Mickey and the Beanstalk was cut from Two Fabulous Characters and paired with Bongo instead. By late 1947, Wind in the Willows was paired with The Legend of Sleepy Hollow and re-titled The Adventures of Ichabod and Mr Toad.

Disney had provided the voice for Mickey Mouse since his debut in 1928, and Fun and Fancy Free was the last time he would voice the role regularly, as he no longer had the time or energy to do so. Disney recorded most of Mickey's dialogue in the spring and summer of 1941. Sound effects artist Jimmy MacDonald would become the character's new voice actor, starting in 1948. Disney, however, did reprise the role for the introduction to the original 1955–1959 run of The Mickey Mouse Club.

Celebrities Edgar Bergen and Dinah Shore introduced the segments in order to appeal to a mass audience. Jiminy Cricket from Pinocchio sings "I'm a Happy-Go-Lucky Fellow", a song written for and cut from Pinocchio before its release.

== Reception ==
=== Critical reception ===
Bosley Crowther of The New York Times favorably stated that "Within the familiar framework of the Walt Disney story-cartoon, that magical gentleman and his associates have knocked out a gay and colorful show—nothing brave and inspired but just plain happy ... And while the emphasis is more on the first part than on the second part of that compound, it's okay." John McCarten of The New Yorker wrote critically of the film, stating that "Walt Disney, who seems to have been aiming for mediocrity in his recent productions, has not even hit his mark" with this film. Time was similarly critical of the film, stating that "In spite of the Disney technical skill, it has never been a very good idea to mix cartoons and live actors. With genial showmanship, Mr. Bergen & Co. barely manage to save their part of the show. Most of the Bongo section is just middle-grade Disney, not notably inspired. And once Mickey & friends get involved with Willie, the whole picture peters out and becomes as oddly off-balance and inconsequential as its title." Variety called it a "dull and tiresome film", remarking that "all the technical work and all the names in the world can't compensate for [a] lack of imagination."

Barbara Shulgasser-Parker of Common Sense Media gave the film three out of five stars, praising the hand-drawn, frame-by-frame animation of the film, and citing it as an example of "the Disney accomplishment and finesse". She recommended the film to children who can handle peril and cartoon violence. TV Guide gave the film three out of five stars, claiming that the Bongo portion of the film is "maudlin and overlong", but that the Mickey and the Beanstalk portion is "highly amusing", praising character actor Billy Gilbert's characterization of Willie, the animation in the film, the live-action footage with Edgar Bergen and his dummies, and Cliff "Ukulele Ike" Edwards's performance as the voice of Jiminy. They noted that the film "is a relatively minor work in the Disney oeuvre", but "still quite entertaining".

Dustin Putman reviewed the film with 2 1/2 stars out of 4, stating that "'Bongo' is frequently delightful, but with one caveat: it is glaringly antiquated in its views of romance and gender roles. The parting message—that a couple should say they love each other with a slap—is bizarrely funny for all the wrong reasons." They also described Mickey and the Beanstalk as "an amiable but forgettable telling of 'Jack and the Beanstalk'". Review aggregator website Rotten Tomatoes reported that 78% of critics gave the film positive reviews based on nine reviews with an average rating of 5.4/10. Its consensus states that "Though it doesn't quite live up to its title, Fun and Fancy Free has its moments, and it's a rare opportunity to see Mickey, Donald, and Goofy together."

=== Box-office ===
By the end of its theatrical run, the film had grossed $3,165,000 in worldwide rentals with $2,040,000 being generated in the United States and Canada.

== Music ==
Fun and Fancy Free

Film score by Oliver Wallace, Paul Smith, Eliot Daniel and Charles Wolcott
- Released: 1947
- Label: Disneyland Records

=== Bongo ===
No.	Title	Writer(s)	Performer(s)	Length
1.	"Fun and Fancy Free"	Bennie Benjamin & George David Weiss	Cliff Edwards & The Starlighters
2.	"I'm a Happy-Go-Lucky Fellow"	Ned Washington & Eliot Daniel	Cliff Edwards
3.	"Lazy Countryside"	Bobby Worth	Dinah Shore & The Dinning Sisters
4.	"Too Good to Be True"	Buddy Kaye & Eliot Daniel	Dinah Shore
5.	"Say It with a Slap"	Buddy Kaye & Eliot Daniel	Dinah Shore & The King's Men
6.	"Too Good To Be True (Reprise)"	Buddy Kaye & Eliot Daniel	Dinah Shore

=== Mickey and the Beanstalk ===
No.	Title	Writer(s)	Performer(s)	Length
1.	"My, What a Happy Day"	Bill Walsh & Ray Noble	Anita Gordon & The King's Men
2.	"Eat Until I Die"		Pinto Colvig & Clarence Nash
3.	"Fee-Fi-Fo-Fum"	Paul J. Smith	Billy Gilbert
4.	"My Favorite Dream"	Bill Walsh & Ray Noble	Anita Gordon
5.	"Fun and Fancy Free (Reprise)"	Bennie Benjamin & George David Weiss	Cliff Edwards & The Starlighters

== Release ==
=== Home media ===
Fun and Fancy Free was first released on VHS in the United States by Walt Disney Home Video in 1982 for its 35th anniversary. It was re-released on VHS and LaserDisc in the United States and Canada on July 15, 1997, in a fully restored 50th anniversary limited edition as part of the Walt Disney Masterpiece Collection. For this release, both home video versions were THX certified. The film was re-released on VHS and made its DVD debut on June 20, 2000 as part of the Walt Disney Gold Classic Collection. The film was released in a 2-Movie collection Blu-ray with The Adventures of Ichabod and Mr. Toad on August 12, 2014.

== Availability of the shorts as separate features ==
Although the two shorts were not individual full-length features, as was the original intention, they did air as individual episodes on Walt Disney's anthology TV series in the 1950s and 1960s.

=== Bongo ===
Bongo aired as an individual episode on a 1955 episode of the Walt Disney anthology series with new introductory segments, which used Jiminy Cricket's narration and singing in lieu of Dinah Shore's. The short was released separately in 1989 in the Walt Disney Mini-Classics VHS line.

=== Mickey and the Beanstalk ===
The short aired as an individual episode on the Walt Disney anthology series twice with new introductory segments, first in 1955, with Sterling Holloway replacing Edgar Bergen as the narrator after being introduced by Walt Disney. Holloway's narration was released as a stand-alone short in such venues as the 1980s television series Good Morning, Mickey!. This version also frequently aired alongside Dumbo during the 1980s. A brief clip of this version was one of many featured in Donald Duck's 50th Birthday.

Mickey and the Beanstalk aired as a short film on a 1963 episode of the Walt Disney anthology series with new introductory segments featuring Ludwig Von Drake (voiced by Paul Frees). Von Drake replaces Edgar Bergen as the narrator in the 1963 version, for which he has a Bootle-Beetle companion named Herman (replacing the sassy comments of Edgar Bergen's ventriloquist dummy Charlie McCarthy). In the short film version of the feature, Ludwig Von Drake reads a book about fairy tales in which he shows four pictures and clips from a few of Disney's most well-known animated features, including the Evil Queen transforming herself into an old hag in Snow White and the Seven Dwarfs (1937) and Maleficent transforming herself into a dragon in Sleeping Beauty (1959). The Ludwig Von Drake version of Mickey and the Beanstalk was released separately in 1988 in the Walt Disney Mini-Classics line. This version was then re-released, in 1994, as part of the Disney Favorite Stories collection. The Ludwig Von Drake version of the feature is available as part of the Disney Animation Collection (Volume 1).

A third version of Mickey and the Beanstalk was featured on the Disney television show "The Mouse Factory", which aired from 1972 to 1974. This version starred Shari Lewis and Lamb Chop.

In 2004, the theatrical version of Mickey and the Beanstalk (with Edgar Bergen's narration) was released as a bonus feature on the Walt Disney Treasures set Mickey Mouse in Living Color, Volume Two.

== Directing animators ==
- Ward Kimball (Bongo segment: Bongo Meets Lumpjaw)
- Les Clark (Animation supervision: Bongo)
- John Lounsbery (Willie the Giant)
- Fred Moore (Bongo Meets Lullabelle, Mickey Mouse)
- Wolfgang Reitherman (Goofy, Mickey and Donald, Starvation sequence)
- Art Babbitt (Bongo)

== See also ==
- 1947 in film
- List of American films of 1947
- List of Walt Disney Pictures films
- List of Disney theatrical animated features
- List of animated feature films of the 1940s
- List of highest-grossing animated films
- List of films with live action and animation
- List of package films
- List of Disney animated films based on fairy tales

== Bibliography ==
- Barrier, Michael (1999). Hollywood Cartoons: American Animation in Its Golden Age. University of California Press. ISBN 978-0-520-25619-4.
- Gabler, Neal (2006). Walt Disney: The Triumph of the American Imagination. Vintage Books. ISBN 978-0-679-75747-4.
