= Bonga, Vologda Oblast =

Bonga Бонга
- Settlement
- Location within Vologda Oblast Location within Russia
- Coordinates: 60°30′N 37°33′E
- Country: Russia
- Region: Vologda Oblast
- District: Vashkinsky District
- Time zone: UTC+3:00

Bonga (Russian: Бонга) is a rural locality (a settlement) in Kisnemskoye Rural Settlement, Vashkinsky District, Vologda Oblast, Russia. The population was 277 as of 2002. There are 7 streets.

== Geography ==
Bonga is located 20 km north of Lake Beloye on the right bank of the Kema River, 52 km northwest from Lipin Bor (the district's administrative centre) by road. Yekimovo is the nearest rural locality.
