= Bungo Yoshida =

Japanese puppeteer (1934–2008)

Bungo Yoshida Yoshida Bungo (吉田 文吾) (May 3, 1934 – January 16, 2008) was a Japanese puppeteer, who built a whole new audience for the traditional puppeteering form of bunraku by combining it with rock music.

Born as Teruo Takahashi Takahashi Teruo (高橋 照夫) in Moriguchi, Osaka in 1934, Yoshida was initiated into the Bunraku theatre as a disciple of Tamagoro Yoshida II in 1951, changing his name to Kotama Yoshida. For twenty years, he performed mostly female roles, until switching to male roles in the 1970s. Concerned by falling audience numbers and a lack of young people taking up bunraku, Yoshida combined the ancient art form with his love of rock music, which he combined for a 1980 adaptation of The Love Suicides at Sonezaki (Sonezaki Shinjū) with the music written and performed by Japanese rock musician Ryudo Uzaki, and occasionally with a live orchestra.

He was formerly married to the American television personality and essayist Edith Hanson. Yoshida died at his home in Osaka on January 16, 2008 after suffering from liver cancer.
