= Mbongo (disambiguation) =

Mbongo is the common ancestor of the Sawa peoples of Cameroon according to their oral traditions.

Mbongo may also refer to:

== People ==
- Mbedi a Mbongo, son of Mbongo
- Guy M'Bongo (born 1968), basketball player from the Central African Republic
- Paul Mbongo (born 1971), Cameroonian boxer

== Places ==
- Mbongo, Angola, a town in southwest Africa
- Mobayi-Mbongo, formerly known as Banzyville or Banzystad, a town in the Democratic Republic of the Congo

== Other uses ==
- OC Mbongo Sport, a football club in the Democratic Republic of Congo

== See also ==
- Bongo (disambiguation)
