= Bonga (surname) =

Bonga is a South African surname that may refer to the following notable people:

- George Bonga (1802–1880), Indian fur trader
- Isaac Bonga (born 1999), German basketball player
- Jan Bonga (born 1964), Swiss windsurfer
- Paul Bonga Bonga (born 1933), Congolese footballer
- Pierre Bonga (1770s–1831), trapper and interpreter
- Tarsis Bonga (born 1997), German-Congolese footballer
