= Leka Bungo =

Albanian director and TV executive (1944–2025)

- Born: 28 February 1944; Vlora, Albania
- Died: 11 June 2025 (aged 81); Tirana, Albania
- Education: Academy of Arts of Albania
- Occupations: Director, actor, screenwriter
- Years active: 1960s–2025
- Known for: Albanian cinema and television
- Notable work: Oshëtime në bregdet, Një djalë edhe një vajzë

Leka Bungo (28 February 1944 – 11 June 2025) was an Albanian director, actor and screenwriter.

== Life and career ==
Bungo was born in Vlora on 28 February 1944, graduating from the Higher Institute of Arts, before working as a theatre director in Fier.

He became the head of Albanian Radio Television Board of Directors in the 2010s, but was involved in a scandal related to the receipt of money from the institution. He was replaced as Chairman of the RTSH Steering Council on 17 March 2025 by Fatjon Hoxhalli.

Bungo died in Tirana on 11 June 2025, at the age of 81.

== Filmography ==
- 1966: Oshëtime në bregdet (Howling on the coast)
- 1990: Një djalë edhe një vajzë (A boy and a daughter)
