= Bongo Joe Coleman =

American drummer (1923–1999)

Background information
- Born: George Coleman; November 28, 1923; Haines City, Florida
- Died: December 19, 1999 (aged 76) San Antonio, Texas
- Genres: Jazz
- Occupation: Street musician

George "Bongo Joe" Coleman (November 28, 1923 – December 19, 1999) was an American street musician who was recognized for performing with a makeshift drum kit manufactured from oil drums. Considered both an inspired and novelty act, Coleman developed a unique percussion sound as he toured popular tourist attractions in Texas but preferred to perform on the streets rather than lucrative stage venues. He recorded one album for Arhoolie Records in 1968 and it remains in print.

== Early life ==
He was born George Coleman in Haines City, Florida, on November 28, 1923. His father died before he was born and his mother died when he was seven. After graduating high school, he lived with his older sister in Detroit.

== Musical career ==
Coleman was engaged by the city's jazz scene, and began his career by accompanying local musicians on piano, including Sammy Davis Jr. In the 1940s, in Houston, he spent time in bands at a number of locales. Here, for the first time, he played an unconventional percussion instrument – unconventional in that he fabricated a makeshift drum kit out of 55-gallon oil drums. How he developed his drumming technique and tuning over the years resulted in a unique and novel sound.

Despite more lucrative offers by established venues, for 15 years, Coleman preferred playing on the streets of Galveston; another 15 years were spent in San Antonio where his nickname "Bongo Joe" was originated. The latter city was where Coleman recorded his only album, George Coleman: Bongo Joe, in 1968 with producer Chris Strachwitz of Arhoolie Records; his work remains in print to this day. One song from the album, "Innocent Little Doggy", became an underground classic in Texas, as well as in England. A low-profile but well-respected musician, Coleman occasionally participated at more prominent events such as the HemisFair, New Orleans Jazz and Heritage Festival, and Gerald Ford's presidential campaign in 1976. In 1991, he appeared on the PBS program Almost Live from the Liberty Bar.

Coleman's music career ended abruptly in the early 1990s when he was diagnosed with diabetes and kidney disease. He died on December 19, 1999, age 76.

He was referenced in Gary P. Nunn's 1984 song "What I Like About Texas" and in Garrett T. Capps' 2016 song "Born In San Antone".
