= Kia Pregio =

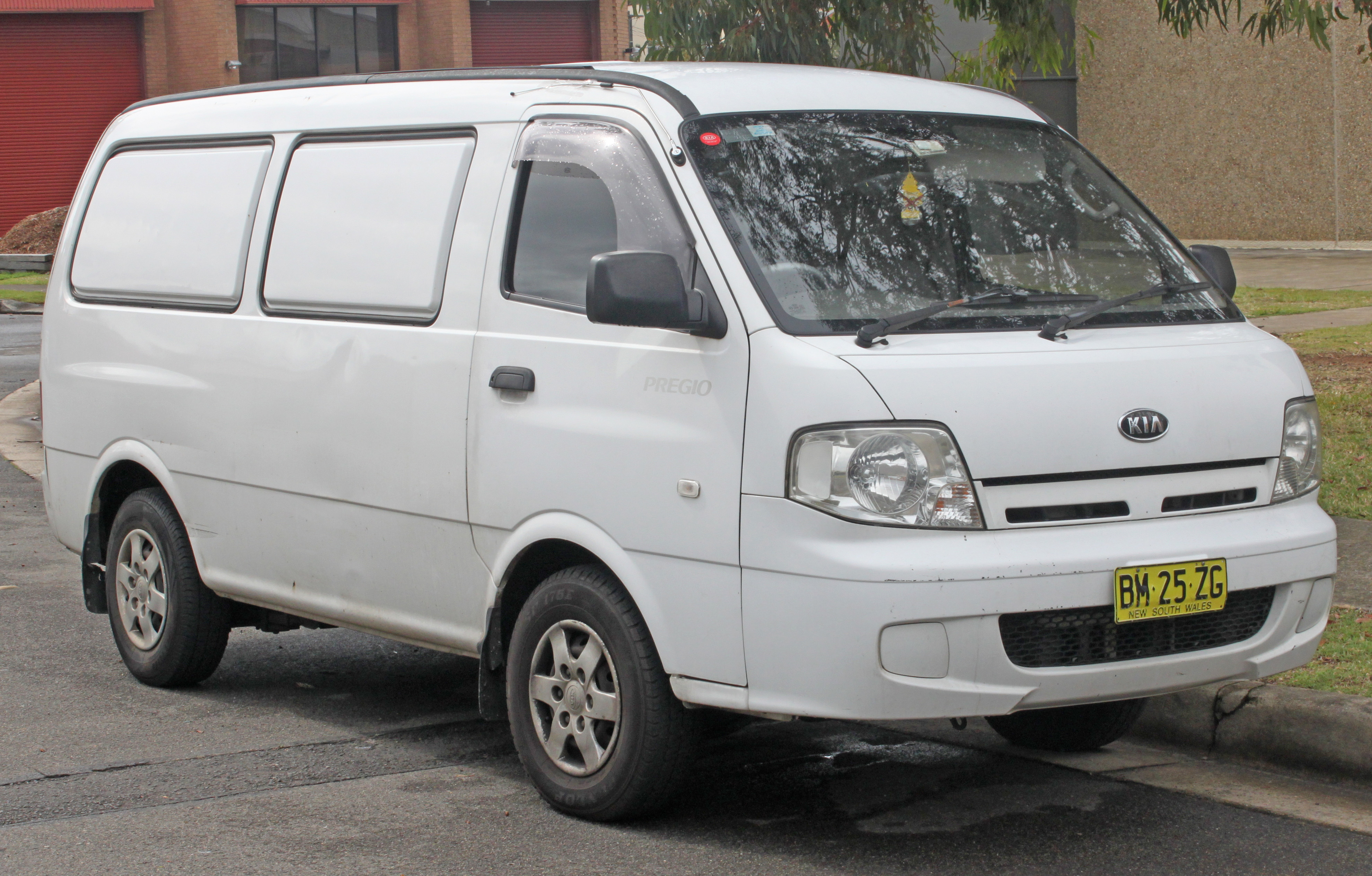

Overview
- Manufacturer: Kia
- Also called: Kia Besta GS (Brazil); Kia Pregio Grand; Kia Bongo III Coach (South Korea)
- Production: 1995–2006
- Assembly: South Korea: Gwangju (Gwangju Plant); Ecuador: Quito (AYMESA); Malaysia: Gurun (NAM); Philippines: Parañaque (Columbian Autocar Corporation)

Body and chassis
- Class: Light commercial vehicle
- Body style: 4-door van; 4-door minibus
- Layout: Front-engine, rear-wheel-drive
- Related: Kia Bongo

Powertrain
- Engine: diesel: 2.5 L D4BH turbo I4; 2.7 L J2 I4; 3.0 L JT I4
- Transmission: 5-speed manual; 4-speed automatic

Dimensions
- Wheelbase: 2,580 mm (101.6 in)
- Length: 4,900 mm (192.9 in)
- Width: 1,810 mm (71.3 in)
- Height: 1,970 mm (77.6 in)

Chronology
- Predecessor: Kia Besta
- Successor: Kia Travello (Indonesia)

The Kia Pregio is a rear-wheel drive cabover van and minibus based on the Kia Bongo and manufactured by Kia from November 1995 to 2006. It replaced the previous Bongo-based van, sold as the "Besta" in most markets. At one point, it slotted between the Kia Carens and the larger, front-wheel drive Kia Carnival/Sedona. The long-wheelbase version was known as the Kia Pregio Grand. The Kia Pregio Grand is a best selling van in Latin American countries such as Colombia and Ecuador because of its high passenger capacity in its segment (16-19 passengers).

== Overview ==
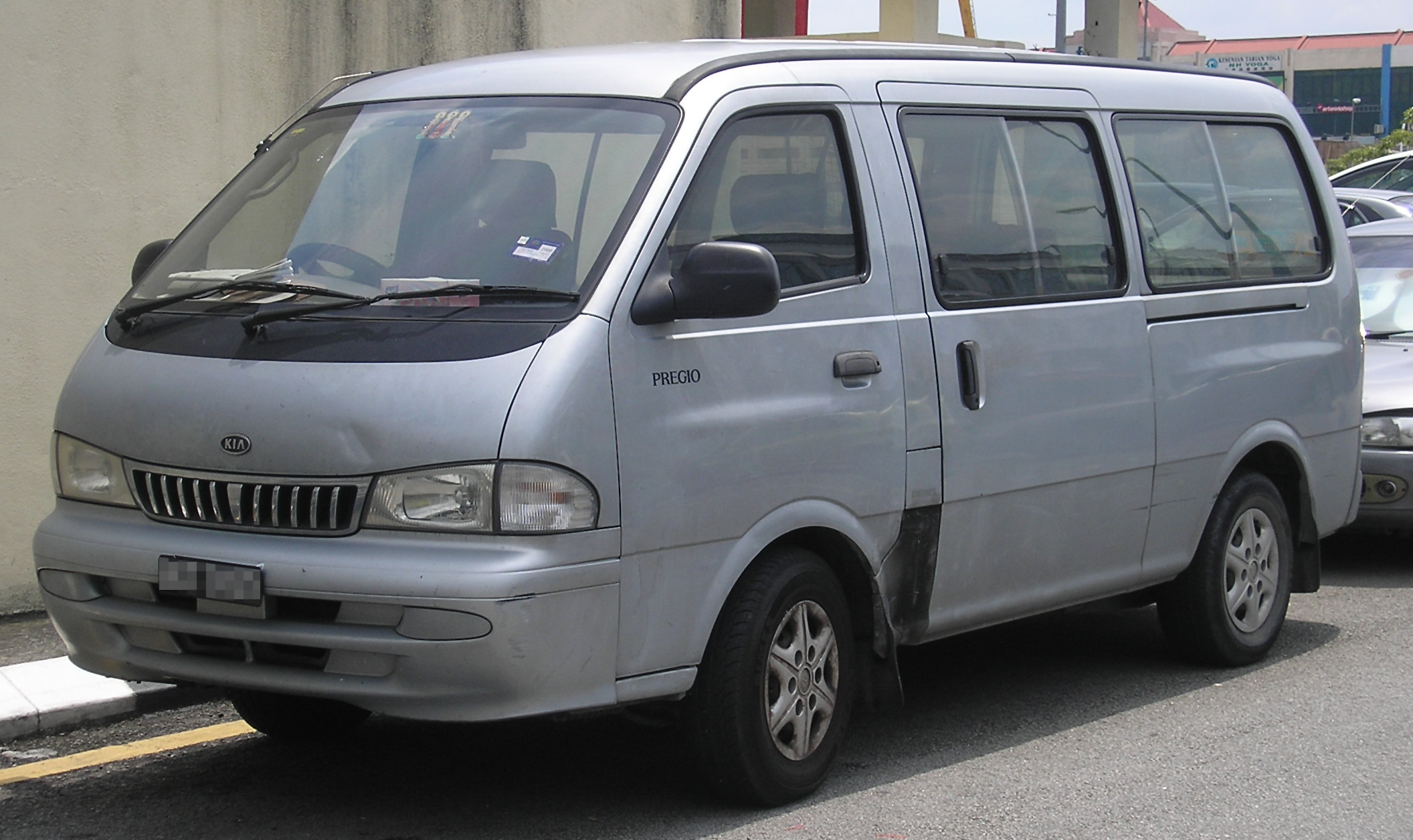

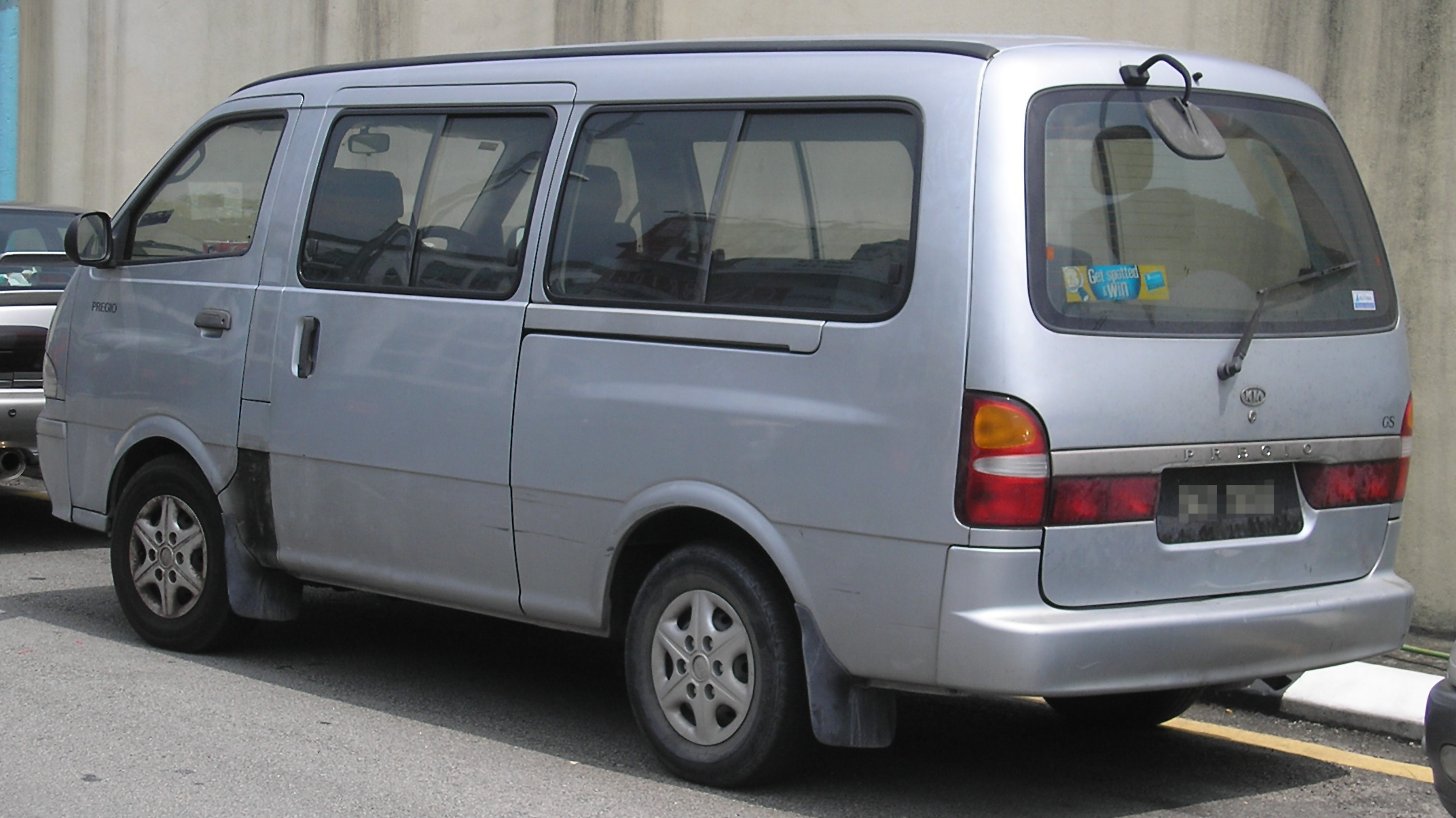
Kia Pregio (CT, Malaysia)

The original Besta had been receiving a lot of complaints due to engine problems, so when a new minivan was developed utilizing the more modern technology of the updated Bongo J2, it was decided to give it a new name. Thus, the Pregio appeared in 1995, with the 2.7 L (2,665 cc) diesel engine of the Bongo J2. The original Pregio received updates in 1998, 2000, and 2002. From 1997 a 3.0 OHV diesel engine with 90 PS (66 kW) was also available and in 2001 a 4-speed automatic transmission was added. For export markets, right-hand drive Pregios were built only in panel van form. The front suspension is independent with coil springs and double wishbones, while at the rear a live axle with elliptic leaf springs is found, to save space and to handle heavy loads. Disc brakes up front and drums at the rear were standard in Europe at least.

Late in its life, a 2.5 L (2,476 cc) intercooled turbo-diesel engine of Mitsubishi origins (called TCi) was made available in European market Pregios. This 94 PS (69 kW) unit could pass Euro III emissions standards for commercial vehicles and the van version could reach a top speed of 160 km/h (99 mph). While earlier Kias had been using Mazda engineering, Hyundai's 1998 takeover meant that Mitsubishi parts found their way into Kia's vehicles. By late 2003 the Pregio underwent a thorough facelift.

In some markets, such as Brazil, the original Besta had developed a very good reputation and had redefined a minivan market where its only competition was the antediluvian (in production since 1950) Volkswagen Kombi. Thus the new Pregio was marketed as the "Kia Besta GS" in Brazil from August 1997. There was no need to change the name, even though Besta means "beast" in most Romance languages, readily lending itself to jokes. The Besta not only dominated the minivan market; it was Brazil's highest selling import vehicle of all types from 1997 until 2001.

=== Facelift model ===
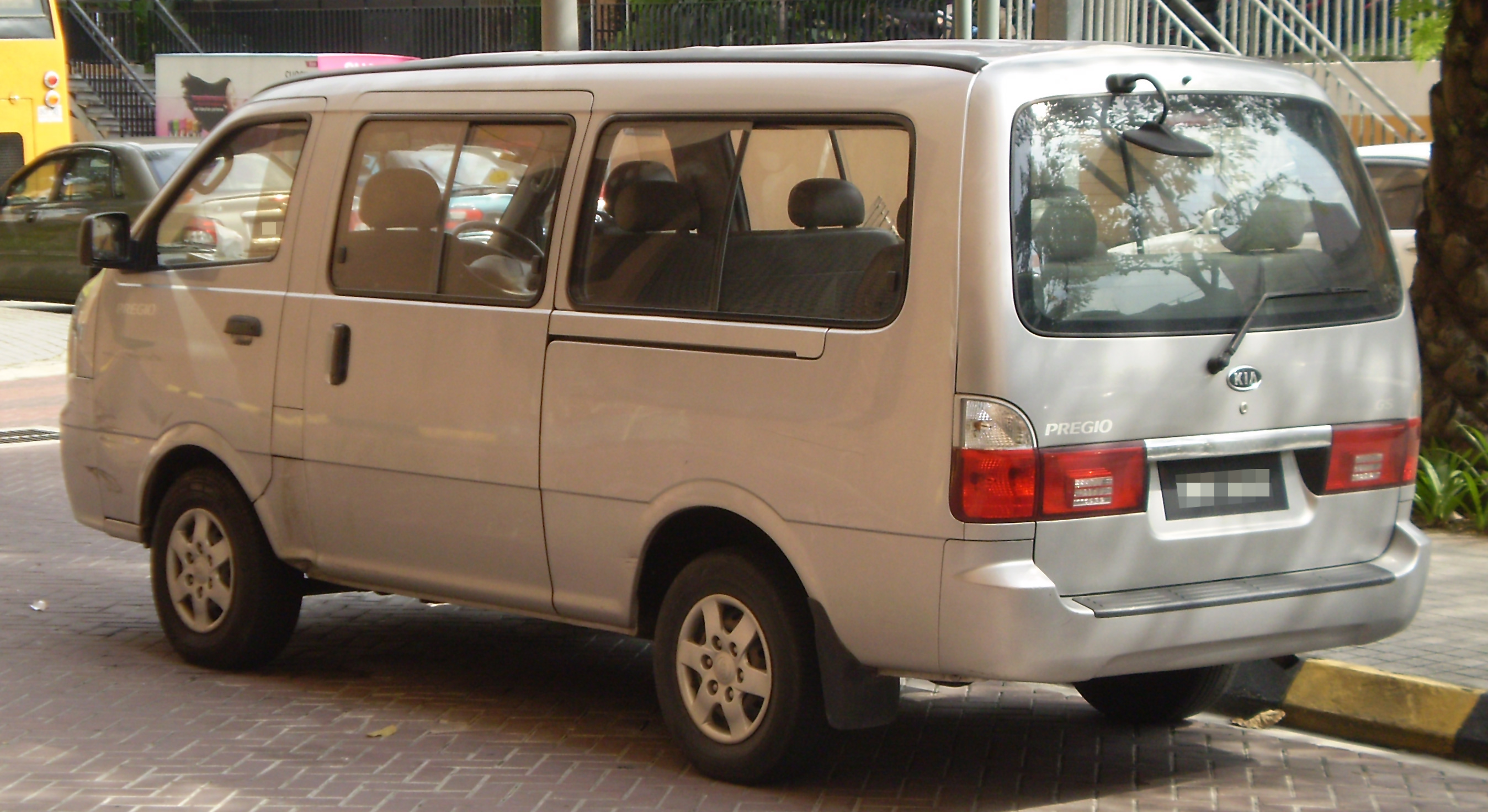
Kia Pregio (CT2, Malaysia)

A different looking Pregio debuted in late 2003, largely a facelift of the first model which could pass stricter European safety demands. It continued until its demise in 2006, due to dropping demand. The Pregio/Pregio Grand was dropped after the 2006 model year to make room for the more passenger-oriented, similarly-sized, short-wheelbase, front-wheel drive Kia Carnival/Sedona (originally the Carnival/Sedona was sold only in long-wheelbase). In South Korea, it was locally manufactured as the Kia Bongo III Coach.

In Indonesia, a locally manufactured coach van version of the Bongo III replaced the Pregio; it was marketed as the Kia Travello.
