= Eliot Daniel =

American songwriter and lyricist

Eliot Howard Daniel (January 7, 1908 – December 6, 1997) was an American songwriter and lyricist who worked primarily in motion pictures. His most well-known composition is the theme from the television sitcom I Love Lucy.

== Biography ==
Daniel was born in Boston on January 7, 1908. His first known song was "What Would People Say", released by Decca Records in 1938. He subsequently became a fixture among Hollywood songwriters, with songs recorded by artists such as Guy Lombardo, Dinah Shore, Gene Autry, Bing Crosby, Burl Ives, Sarah Vaughan, and Marilyn Monroe. He earned Oscar nominations for writing "Lavender Blue" for the 1949 film So Dear to My Heart and for the lyrics to "Never" for 1951's Golden Girl. Collaborating with Johnny Lange in 1947, he wrote the classic Western song "Blue Shadows on the Trail".

Surprisingly, Daniel's most famous composition was outside the mainstream of his movie work: the I Love Lucy theme song. He composed it on the condition that his name would not be associated with it. Being primarily known for film work, he didn't want to be connected to an unproven new medium of television. He was also pessimistic about the prospects for the show's success. Later on, he sought credit for the song and received royalties from syndicated reruns.

In 1957 and 1958, he served as president of the 16,000 member Local 47 of the American Federation of Musicians. During his tenure he led a strike against six motion picture studios.

He died on December 6, 1997, in Placerville, California.
