= Bonga (given name) =

Bonga is a given name or stage name of the following notable people:

- Bonga (musician) (born 1942), Angolan singer-songwriter
- Bonga Makaka (born 2000), South African cricketer
- Bonga Mdletshe (1955–2024), South African politician
- Karyendasoul (born 1997 as Bonga Ntozini), South African DJ and music producer
- Bonga Perkins (born 1972), American surfer
