= Pietro Bongo =

Italian writer (1600–1601)

- Born: Bergamo
- Died: 24 September 1601; Bergamo
- Other name: Petrus Bungus
- Occupation: Writer
- Notable work: Numerorum Mysteria

Pietro Bongo (alternate spelling: Petrus Bungus) was a Renaissance Italian writer.

== Life ==
He came from a noble family. He was born and raised in Bergamo, Italy.

He died on 24 September 1601.

== Career ==
He studied the four mathematical arts of the quadrivium: arithmetic and geometry, music theory and astronomy, and philosophy and theology, beside the classical poetry and the occult sciences of magic and kabbalah. He mastered the Hebrew, Greek, and Latin languages.

In his books, he has tried his best to reconcile Pythagorean doctrine with Christian theology.

His major work, the Numerorum Mysteria was first published in 1591 and received an imprimatur from the Catholic Church. It explores the mystical significance of numbers, beginning with lengthy discourses on the numbers one, two and three, and continuing with shorter tracts on significant numbers later in sequence. Bongo draws on a wide range of sources, including the pagan literature and philosophy of Classical Greece and Rome, early Church Fathers and the mainstream Catholic tradition of scholarship, as well as very recent scholarship of his own day. He quotes extensively in a self-conscious display of erudition, which demonstrates the sheer wealth of reference opened to scholars by the development of printing.

== Bibliography ==
Some of his books are:

- Numerorum Mysteria
