= Bongo (short story) =

- Short story by Sinclair Lewis
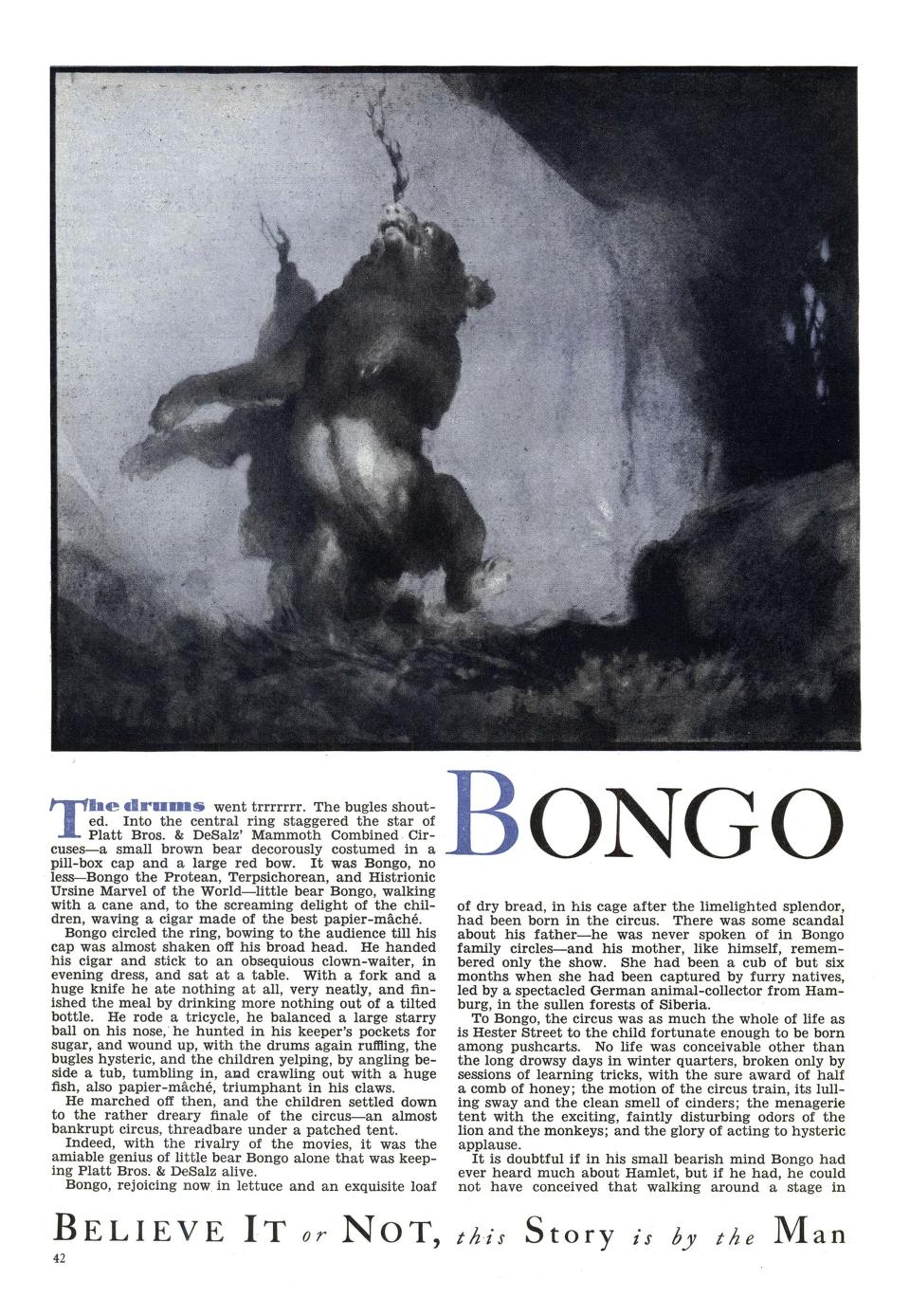
- Page #1 from Cosmopolitan magazine
- Country: United States
- Language: English
- Genre: Children's literature

Publication
- Published in: Cosmopolitan
- Publication type: Periodical
- Publication date: September 1930

"Bongo" is a children's story written by Sinclair Lewis, first published in the September 1930 issue of Cosmopolitan magazine, with illustrations by Josep Segrelles (under the name José Segrelles).

== Synopsis ==
Bongo, a young Kamchatka brown bear trained to do acrobatics and other tricks mimicking humans, is content with his life as the star and main breadwinner of a circus teetering on the edge of bankruptcy. When the circus train attempts a journey through the Rocky Mountains in Colorado, an accident jars Bongo's cage loose. Terrified by the noises, he flees into the wilderness and eventually into a clearing inhabited by many wild black bears.

For the next year, Bongo attempts to befriend the wild bears, who find his civilized behavior annoying and continuously shun him. After he learns to hunt wild animals and defend himself, he is still too peaceful for wild bear approval, and his attempts to mate with the she-bear Silver Ear lead him to fail dismally in competing for her affection with a surly, violent he-bear named Lump Jaw. After his first hibernation, Bongo discovers that Silver Ear had Lump Jaw's cubs, and she viciously drives him away.

A brokenhearted Bongo leaves the clearing and travels west, where he comes across the town of Conquistadore. It is hosting another circus, which immediately attracts Bongo. Heedless of the citizens' panic, he rushes into the big top and prostrates himself before the ringmaster. Recognizing an already-trained bear, the circus accepts him once again into a lap of luxury, with its other bear – a similarly civilized and pacifistic female – as his mate.

== Adaptations ==
The story was acquired by Walt Disney Productions in 1940 for a possible feature film. World War II sidetracked those plans until 1947. Disney adapted the story as part of its feature Fun and Fancy Free and is narrated by Dinah Shore.

Major differences include having Bongo purposefully escape his confines due to his mistreatment in the circus and desire to feel free. The character of Silver Ear and the civilized female bear at the end are combined into a new character named "Lulubelle" who immediately falls for Bongo and rejects the bullying Lumpjaw. The ending makes Bongo more heroic by defeating Lumpjaw and living his life in the woods with Lulubelle. The other bears that inhabit the area are also turned from black bears into brown bears, and instead of shunning Bongo, they find his courtship with Lulubelle delightful and ultimately celebrate his victory over Lumpjaw.
