= Bungo Shirai =

Japanese journalist and businessman (1928–2024)

- Born: 27 January 1928; Tahara, Aichi Prefecture, Japan
- Died: 29 October 2024 (aged 96)
- Education: Shizuoka Prefectural Shizuoka Senior High School
- Occupations: President of Chunichi Shimbun and owner of the Chunichi Dragons

Bungo Shirai (白井 文吾, Shirai Bungo; 27 January 1928 – 29 October 2024) was a Japanese journalist and businessman, who was the president of Chunichi Shimbun and owner of Nippon Professional Baseball team, the Chunichi Dragons.

== Early life ==
Shirai attended the predecessor to Aichi Prefectural Seisho High School for his middle school education, and graduated from Shizuoka Senior High School.

== Career ==
=== Chunichi Shimbun Co. ===
In 1949 Shirai started working at Chubu Nippon Shimbun Co. (Now Chunichi Shimbun Co.)

As a journalist, Shirai covered violent crimes within the society department. While working with the society department he edited "Retsujitsu Saipantō" (The Blazing Sun of Saipan) in 1979, a book touching on the experiences of Japanese soldiers in Saipan during World War II. Throughout his career at the company he held various positions within the Nagoya head office including department head of accounting, head of the Nagoya head office editing department and managing director.

From 2007, Shirai served as president and chairman of Chunichi Shimbun and the Chunichi Dragons.

Shirai was also on the board of the Japan Association of Major Theaters as well as previously serving on the board of Meijo University in Nagoya.

=== Chunichi Dragons ===
Shirai was known to have a close relationship with former Dragons player, manager and general manager Hiromitsu Ochiai whom he helped bring to the team. After the Dragons lost to the Nippon Ham Fighters in the 2006 Japan Series Shirai stood by then manager, Ochiai and kept him on for the 2007 season ultimately leading to Chunichi's first Japan Series win in 53 years.

Shirai was also known to have a dislike of the long-serving Kazuyoshi Tatsunami to a point where the player was convinced that he would never be manager of the team while the president remained in charge.

== Death ==
Shirai died on 29 October 2024, aged 96.

== See also ==
- Chunichi Dragons
- Chunichi Shimbun
