= Kia Bongo =

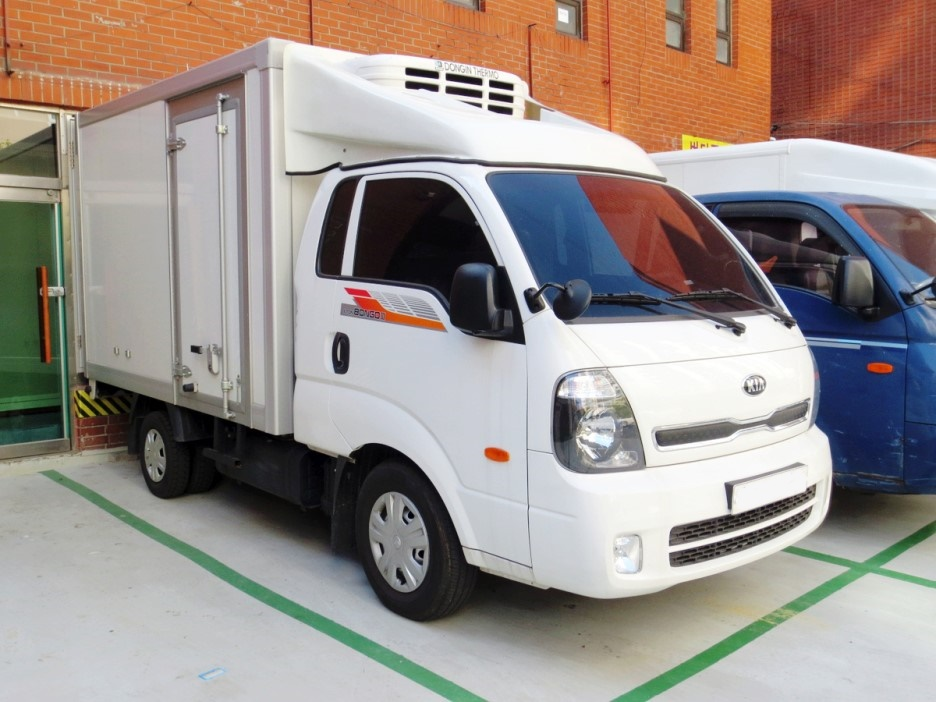

Overview
- Manufacturer: Kia
- Also called: Kia Frontier; Kia Big-Up (Pickup variant; Indonesia); Kia Pregio/Bongo III Coach (Van variant); Kia Travello (Van variant; Indonesia, 2004–2018); Kia Kaon (Taiwan); Forland K1; THACO Kia New Frontier (Vietnam); Kia KC2700; Kia K2400; Kia K2500; Kia K2500 Karga (Philippines, 2019–present); Kia K2700; Kia K3000S; Kia K4000G; Kia Jumbo (Pickup variant; Thailand, 2004–2011); Kia Towner K2500; People Land and Serbia Kia Pitipan
- Production: 1980–present
- Assembly: South Korea: Gwangju (Gwangju Plant); Ecuador: Quito (AYMESA); Uruguay: Montevideo (Nordex); Algeria: Batna (GLOVIZ); Pakistan: Karachi (Kia Lucky Motors); Philippines: Parañaque (1990s–2006), Biñan, Laguna (2006–2019); Columbian Autocar Corporation (CAC); Santa Rosa, Laguna (2019–present); (Kia Philippines); Vietnam: Chu Lai (THACO)

Body and chassis
- Class: Light commercial vehicle
- Body style: Van; Pickup truck

Chronology
- Successor: Kia Pregio (for Besta)

The Kia Bongo (Hangul:기아 봉고), also known as the Kia K-Series or Kia Besta, is a cabover pickup truck and van produced by the South Korean automobile manufacturer Kia since 1980.

The Bongo was first launched in 1980 under the name Bongo. In 1997, the third generation Bongo Frontier was launched. As of 2004, the Kia Bongo was in its fourth version, confusingly sold as the Kia Bongo III. "Frontier" was dropped from the name with this revision.

== Background ==
Kia has produced small and large trucks for the South Korean market for at least 25 years. Rear-wheel-drive Bongo trucks have been on the market in Korea since at least the late 1980s, and these were equipped with a four-cylinder diesel engine. They have occasionally been sold with various surnames such as Kia Bongo Frontier (third generation Bongo), which was replaced by the Kia Bongo III in 2004, and under a variety of names in different export markets. The Bongo Frontier was one of the first Kia cars to be exported to Europe and South America.

In some markets, such as Europe, Australia and South America, the Bongo is branded as the Kia K-Series or the Kia Frontier, which includes the K2400 and K2700. In Taiwan, it is known as the Kia Kaon, while in Vietnam, it is manufactured under license by THACO and sold as the THACO Kia New Frontier.

=== First generation (1980–1994) ===
Production of the truck started in 1980 and the van started in 1981. Early Bongos had round headlights, although these were changed for square units in 1981. The first Bongos also used "Kiamaster" logos rather than simply "Kia"; this was changed in February 1986. The Bongo originally came with the 2.2 liter "S2" diesel engine of Perkins origins, producing 70 PS (51 kW). The 1.4 liter "UC" petrol engine became an option in 1985. 'Wide Bongo' production started in 1987. Between 1987 and 1990 the Bongo was sold as the "Power Bongo", to reflect an upgrade to the 80 PS (59 kW) 2.4 litre "SF" diesel engine. The Power Bongo also has wide rectangular headlights, rather than the smaller units used previously. The first generation Bongo was removed from production in December 1994, although the tougher Ceres version continued for another seven years.

==== Kia Ceres ====
The Kia Ceres was a special agricultural version. It was a one-ton truck that shared a slightly longer front end with the Kia Titan. From 1987, it was also available with four-wheel drive; eventually the rear-wheel drive models were cancelled in the domestic market. Certain export markets with more rugged conditions, such as the Philippines, Latin America, Australia, and Turkey, received the Ceres model rather than the Bongo (in some places, both were available). The Ceres utilized the original BA2 cabin, except it uses a unique front clip. It was facelifted in 1995 when it received a new front clip with round headlights and the then-new Kia logo.

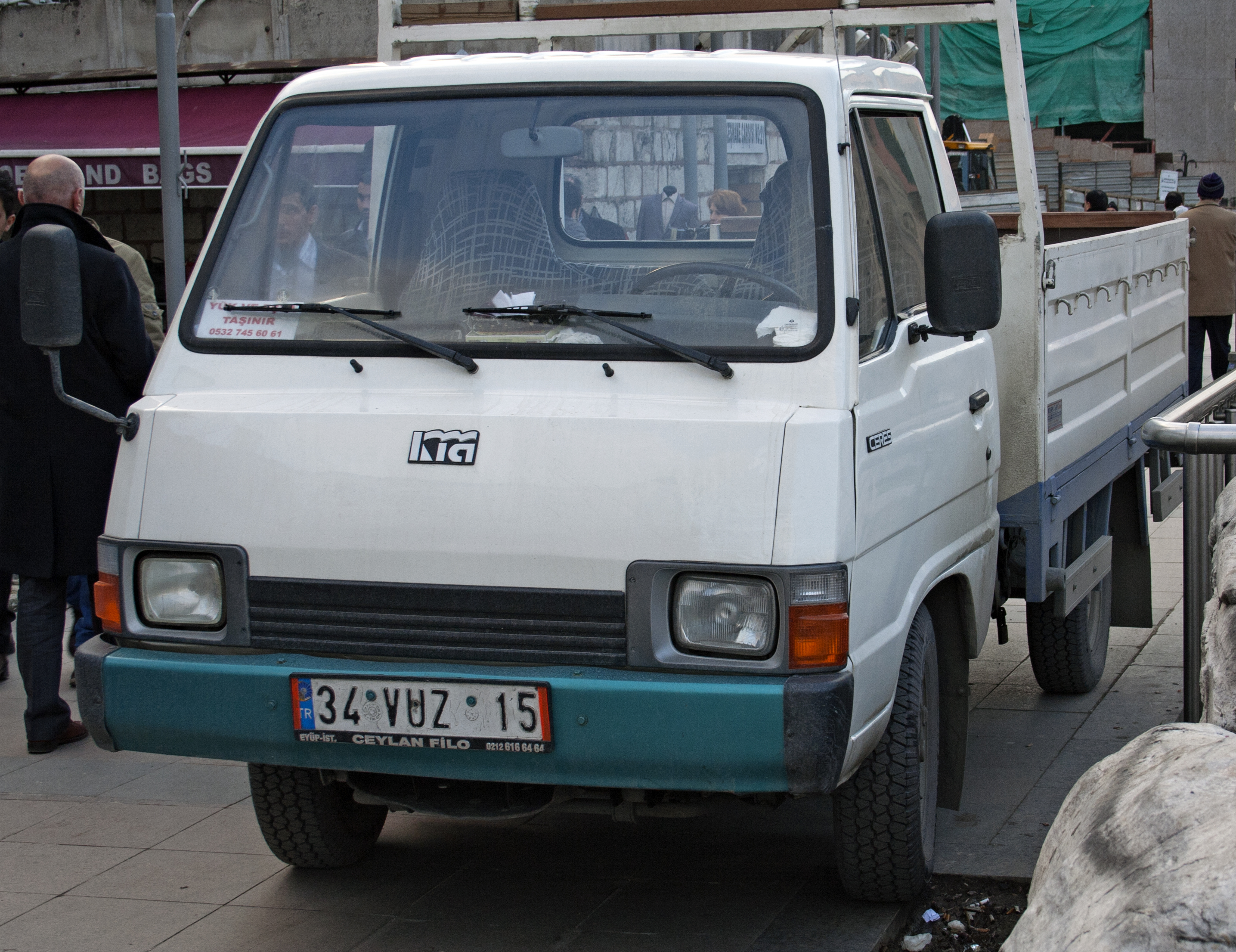
Early, pre-facelifted model

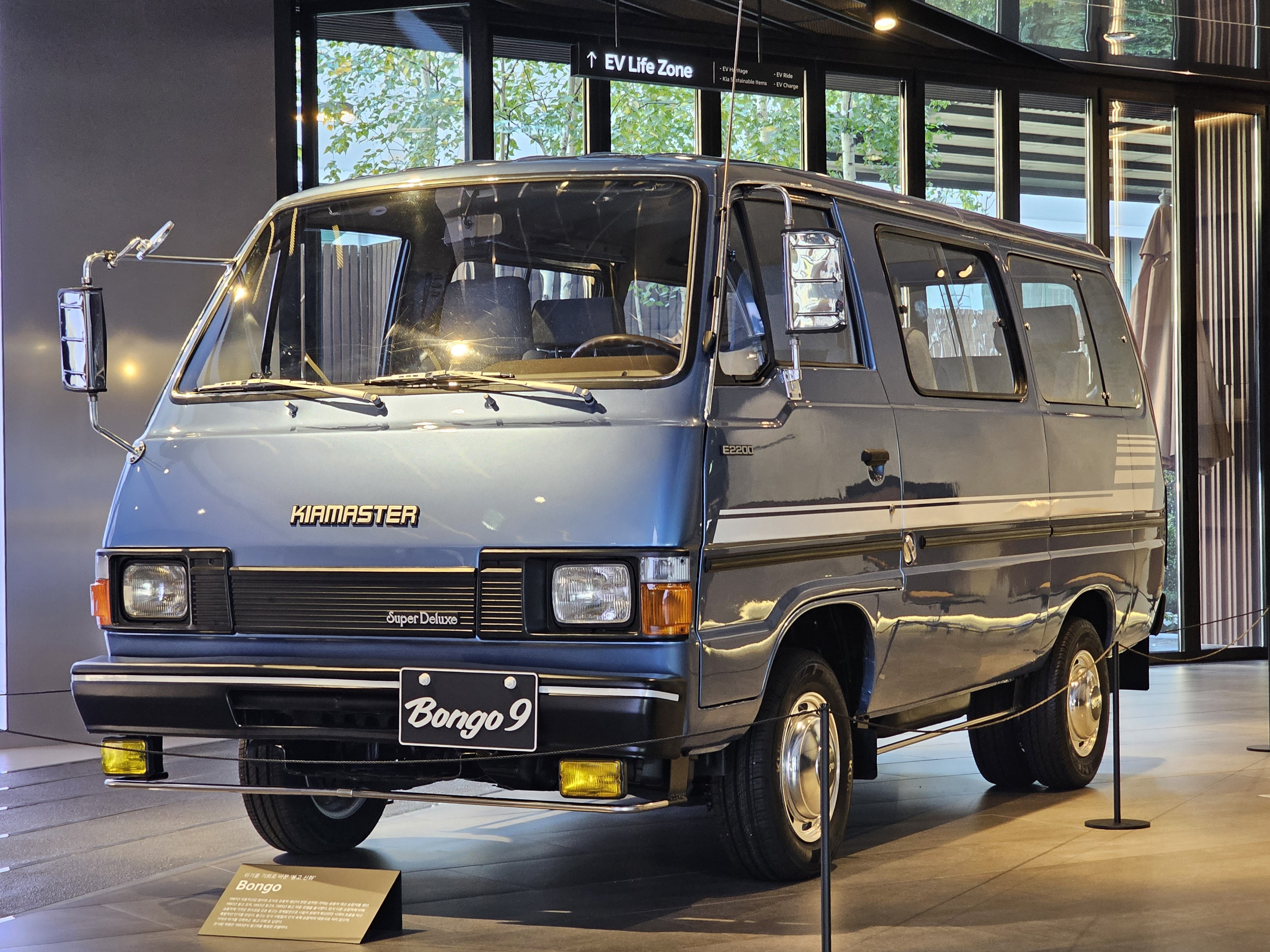
Kiamaster Bongo 9

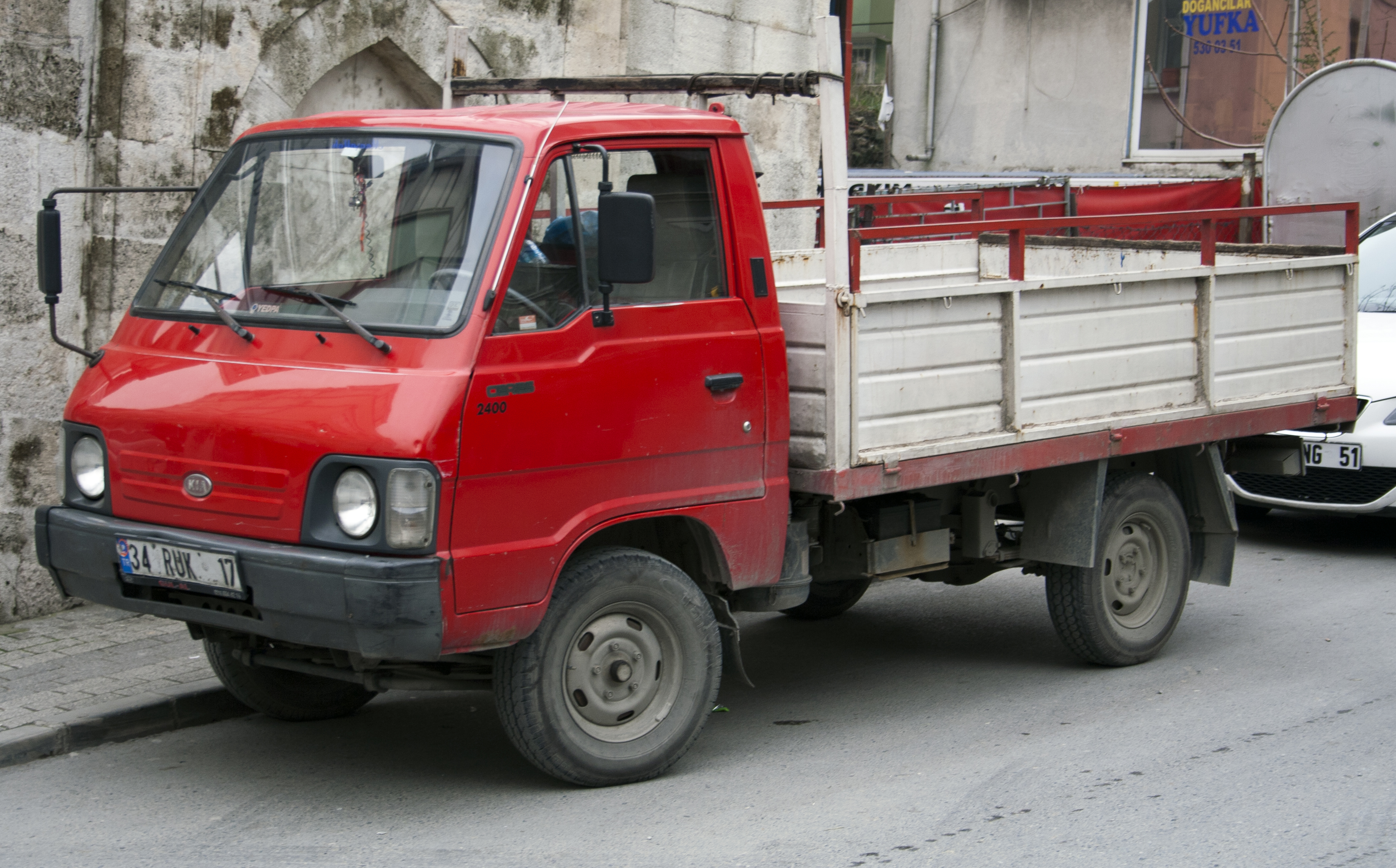
Kia Ceres (facelift)

=== Second generation (1990–1997) ===
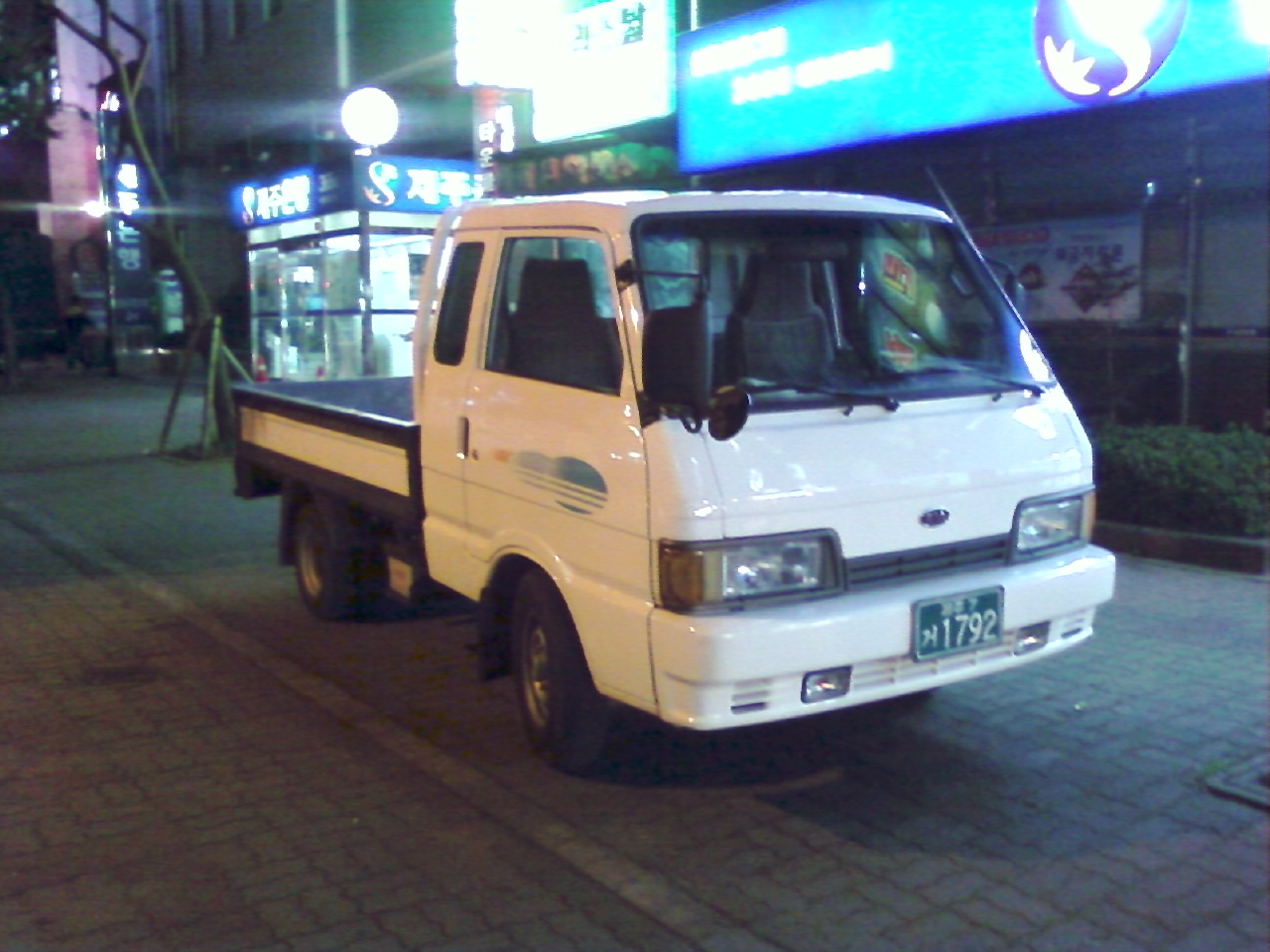
Kia Wide Bongo 2700 (1992–1994)

In January 1990 the second generation Bongo Wide (sold as plain "Bongo" in most export markets) appeared. It was largely a rebadged SR-series Mazda Bongo Brawny. In 1993, a 2.7-litre engine was introduced. In October 1994, Kia's new logo replaced the old "chimney" design. In 1995 a reengined and lightly facelifted version called the "Bongo J2" appeared; this reflected the name of the new engine. The second generation Bongo model for passengers (coach) is named the Kia "Besta" (or "HiBesta"), usually referred to as 'Besta'—which means "beast" in many Romance languages including Portuguese. This did not stop the Besta from immediately becoming the highest selling minivan in the Brazilian market. The Besta name was also used for cargo van versions in many countries. The Besta originally had the 2.2 liter Mazda R2 diesel engine with 62 PS (46 kW), but at the end of 1994 the 80 PS (59 kW) 2.7 liter J2 unit was placed in the Besta as well. This version can reach 128 km/h (80 mph).

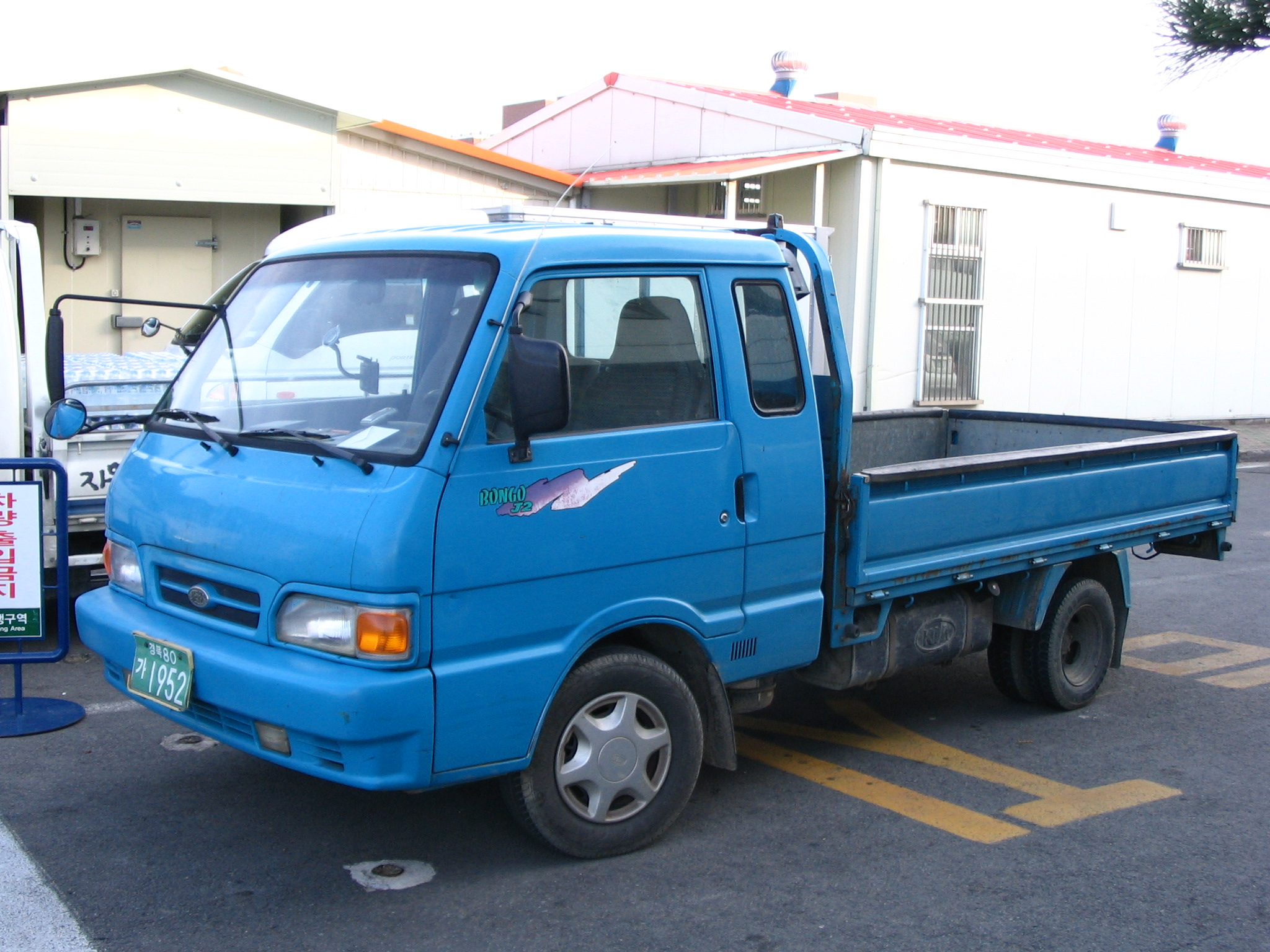
Kia Bongo J2 (1995–1997)

The Bongo J2 also formed the basis for the new Kia Pregio, which replaced the Kia Besta (the coach version of the Bongo). The Besta 2.7 did continue in production alongside the Pregio until at least the summer of 1997 for markets where this lower priced model retained some popularity. Export models of the second generation Bongo often used the K2400 or K2700 labels.

=== Third generation (1997–2004) ===
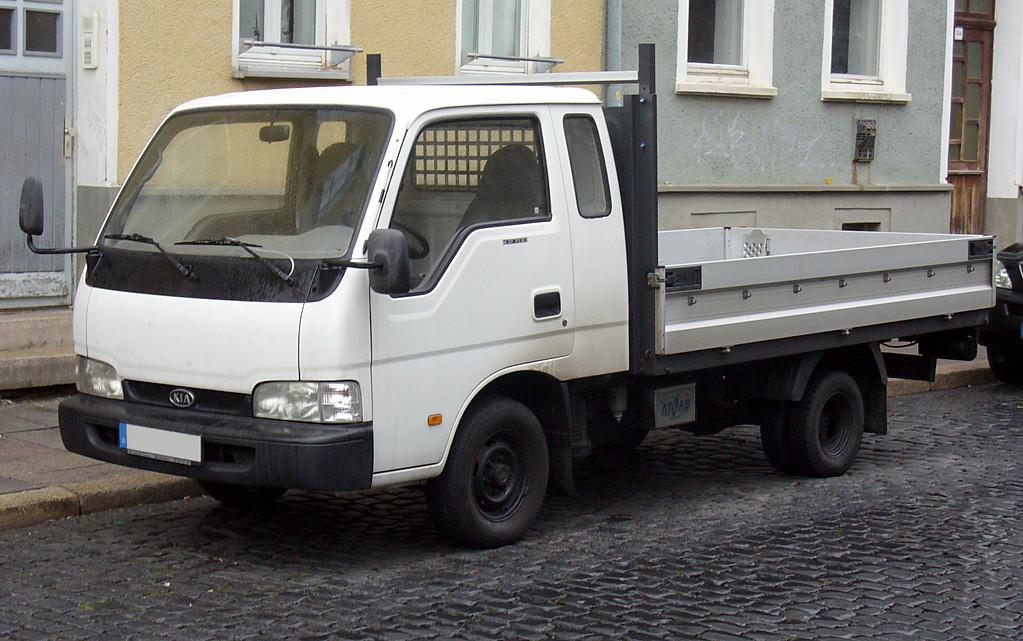
Kia Bongo Frontier

The third generation Bongo appeared in April 1997, now with the "Bongo Frontier" name. The related van version, Pregio, was introduced in November 1995 and continued in production until 2006. A four-wheel drive version ("Bongo Frontier All Terrain") appeared in December 1999, this meant the final end of the Ceres trucks (with origins dating back to the 1977 Mazda Bongo BA2). The third Bongo had the same JS series 2.7 litre engine with 80 PS (59 kW) as used in the previous model, although an optional 3 litre JT engine with 90 PS (66 kW) was also made available from the beginning. In August 2001 this engine received an additional four horsepower.

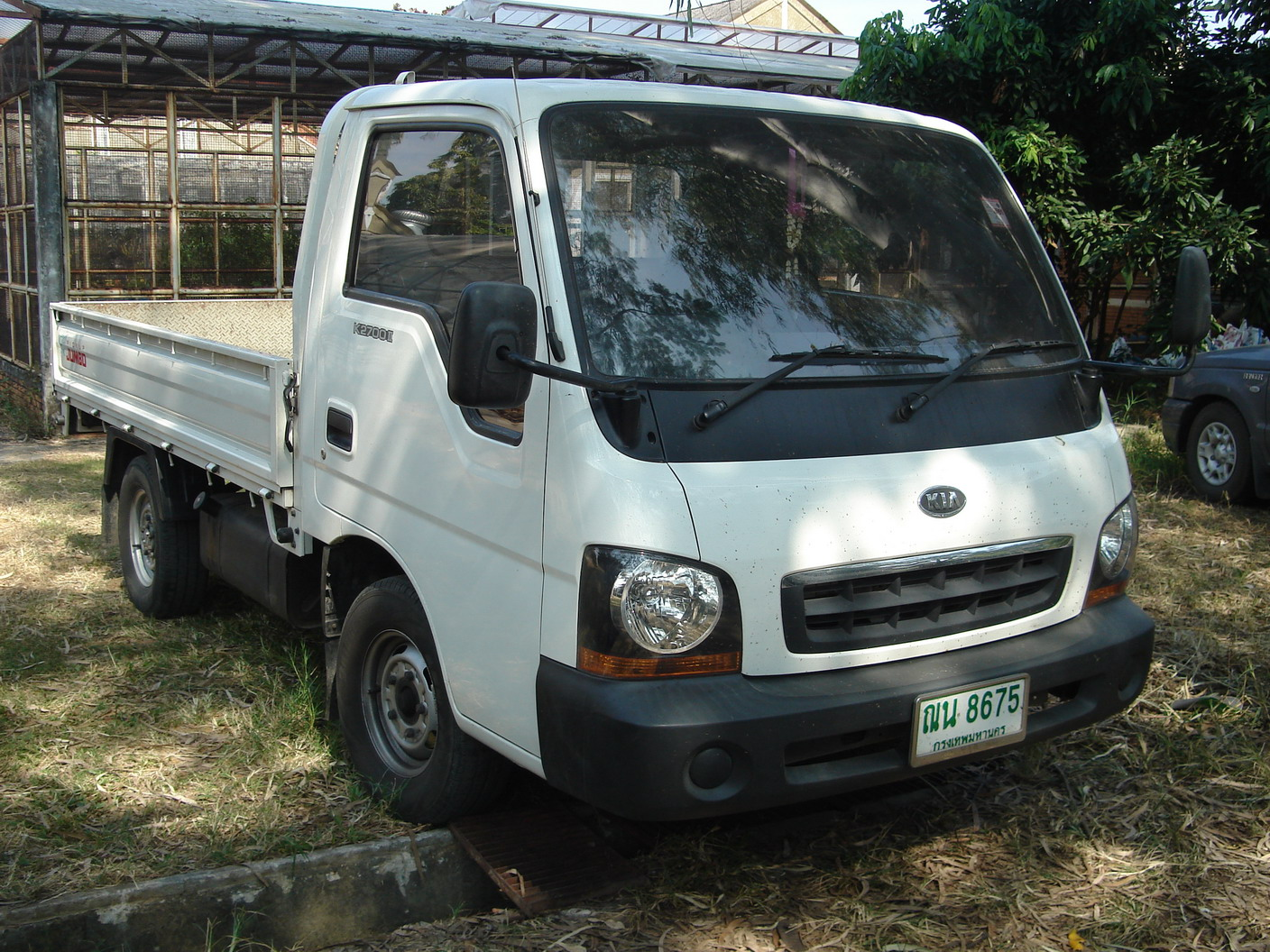
Kia Bongo Frontier / Jumbo K2700II (facelift version)

==== Facelift ====
A facelifted Bongo was introduced in 2000. The truck was discontinued in late 2003, while the Van and Coach models continued to be built until May 2005. With stricter emissions controls coming into effect in South Korea in 2006, the 4x4 dump truck model was discontinued at the same time.

=== Fourth generation (2005–present) ===
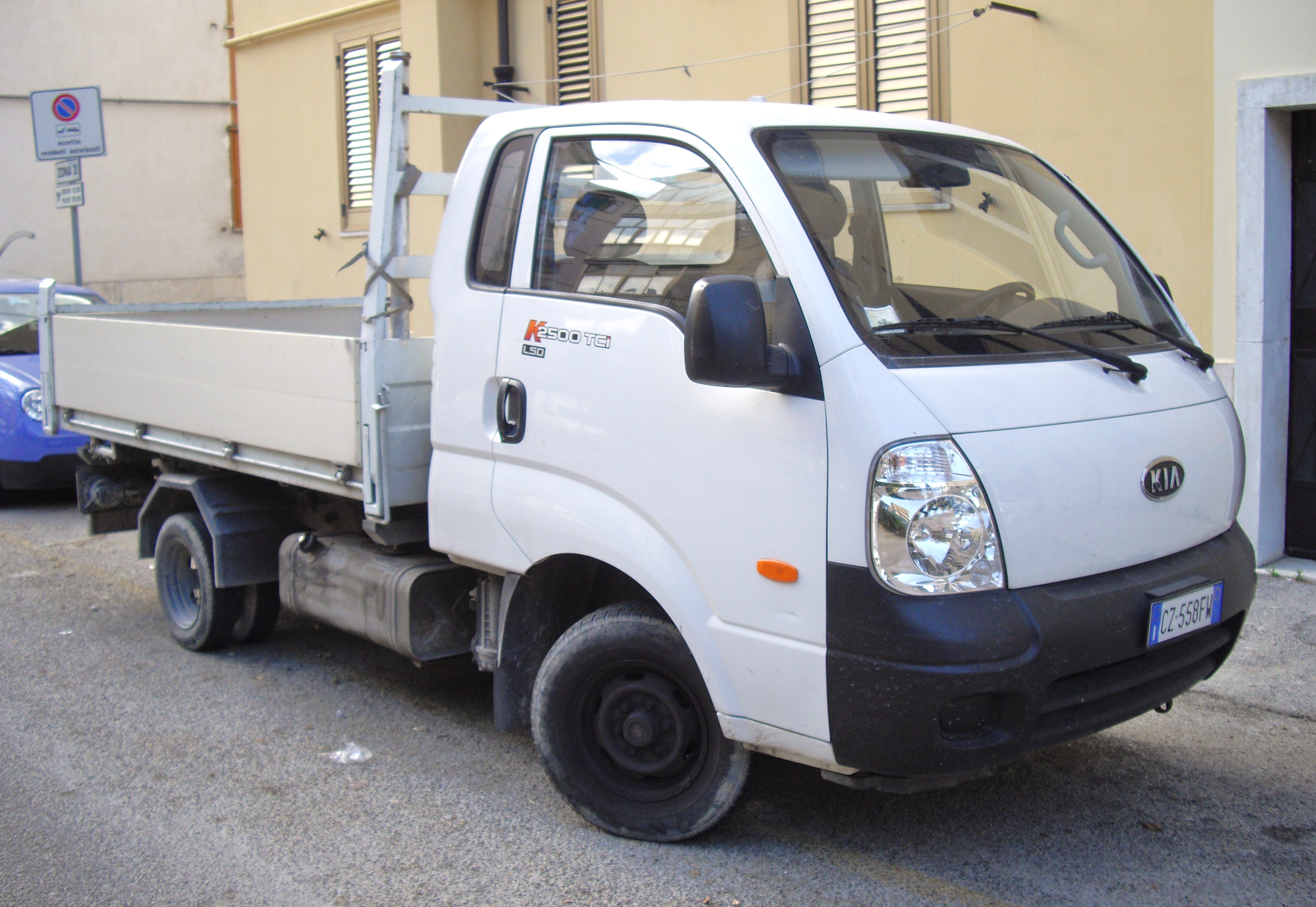
Kia Bongo K2500

The fourth generation, known as the Kia Bongo III, was introduced in 2005, engines were modernized, featuring a common rail option, which is gradually becoming more environmentally friendly.

Due to tighter emissions rules, the 1.2-ton and 1.4-ton variants were discontinued in November 2006. The coachvan, van and trucks except the 1-ton and 1.3-ton models were ceased in production on December 31, 2007, due to low demand. The Bongo III went on hiatus between October 2011 and January 2012, due to tighter emissions rules, but reemerged with a Euro V compliant engine.

The Bongo III was exclusively available in the Philippines as the K2700, from May 2005 to August 2018. It was later replaced by the K2500 in September 2018, which it gained a driver airbag. The K2700 Panoramic was replaced in 2019 by the K2500 Karga, "karga" is the Filipino word for "carry".

In Thailand, the Bongo III is known as the Kia Jumbo since 2005.

In Indonesia, the Bongo III is known as the Kia Big-Up since 2004. It was also available as a coachvan variant, known as the Kia Travello. The Travello was discontinued in 2019. This resulted in the coachvan variant becoming limited to custom builds from coachbuilders.

European sales of the Kia K-Series (with an exception of Russia and Turkey) has been discontinued in late 2007.

==== Facelift ====
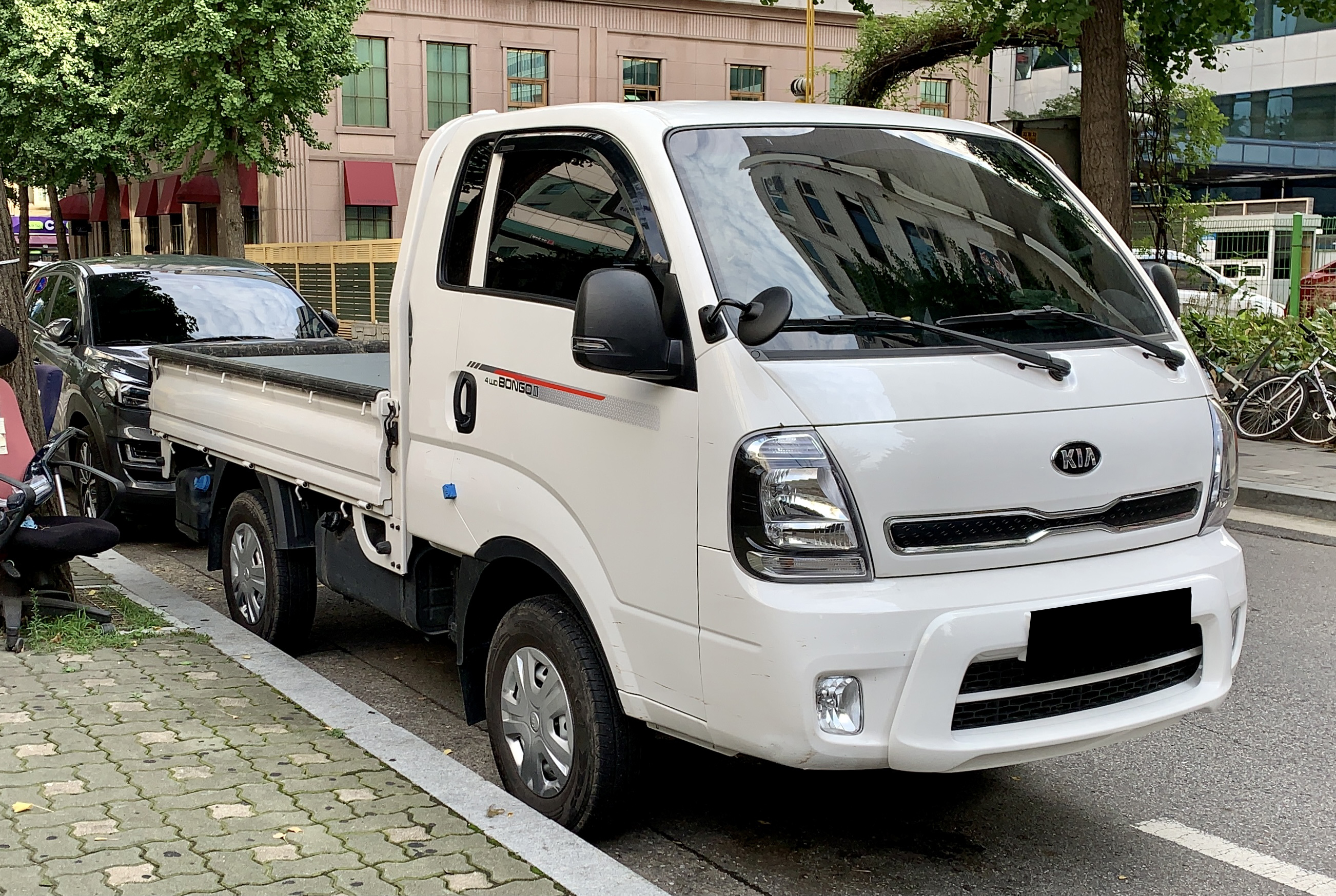
Kia Bongo K2500 (Facelift)

Kia Bongo was updated in 2014, with new gearbox 6-speed engine and much more efficient Euro IV standards, new body design that includes different front and added grille, and wheels increased in size to 15 inches. The K2500, K2700 and K3000S have either a 2.5-litre turbocharged engine that delivers 130 PS (96 kW), or an optional, more old-fashioned 2.7-litre engine that pushes out just 80 PS (59 kW) and another 3.0 liter that adds five more horsepower from the 2.7 litre. It provides all the sufficient loading capabilities, also they have three cab options: standard, super and double cabin. There is another model that is called the K400S and K4000G, which is the bigger van version of the K2500, the K2700 and the K3000II.

In January 2020, an EV version was launched in South Korea. It can go up to 211 km (131 mi) on a charge.

== See also ==
- Mazda Bongo
- Hyundai Porter
- Kia Ceres (in Korean)
- Kia Pregio
