= Bongo (canoe) =

The bongo is a type of canoe, made of wood, typically found in the Hispanic Caribbean regions.

== Description ==
It is short and fat in shape, and is used for river transport and sea fishing. The canoe may be a dugout made out of a single tree trunk, or made of planks of wood put together, often cedar. Due to its small size, it is versatile and easy to transport. Apart from propulsion by oars, small sails may also be used.

The anthropologist Olaf Holm described the bongo in his book Cultura Manteño-Huancavilca.

== Locality ==
The boats are common in rural Colombia and Ecuador, for example, in the latter regions of Esmeraldas, Guayas, Santa Elena, Manabi, etc. Other common types of small craft in these waters are champan, piragua, and canoes.
