= Kia Combi =

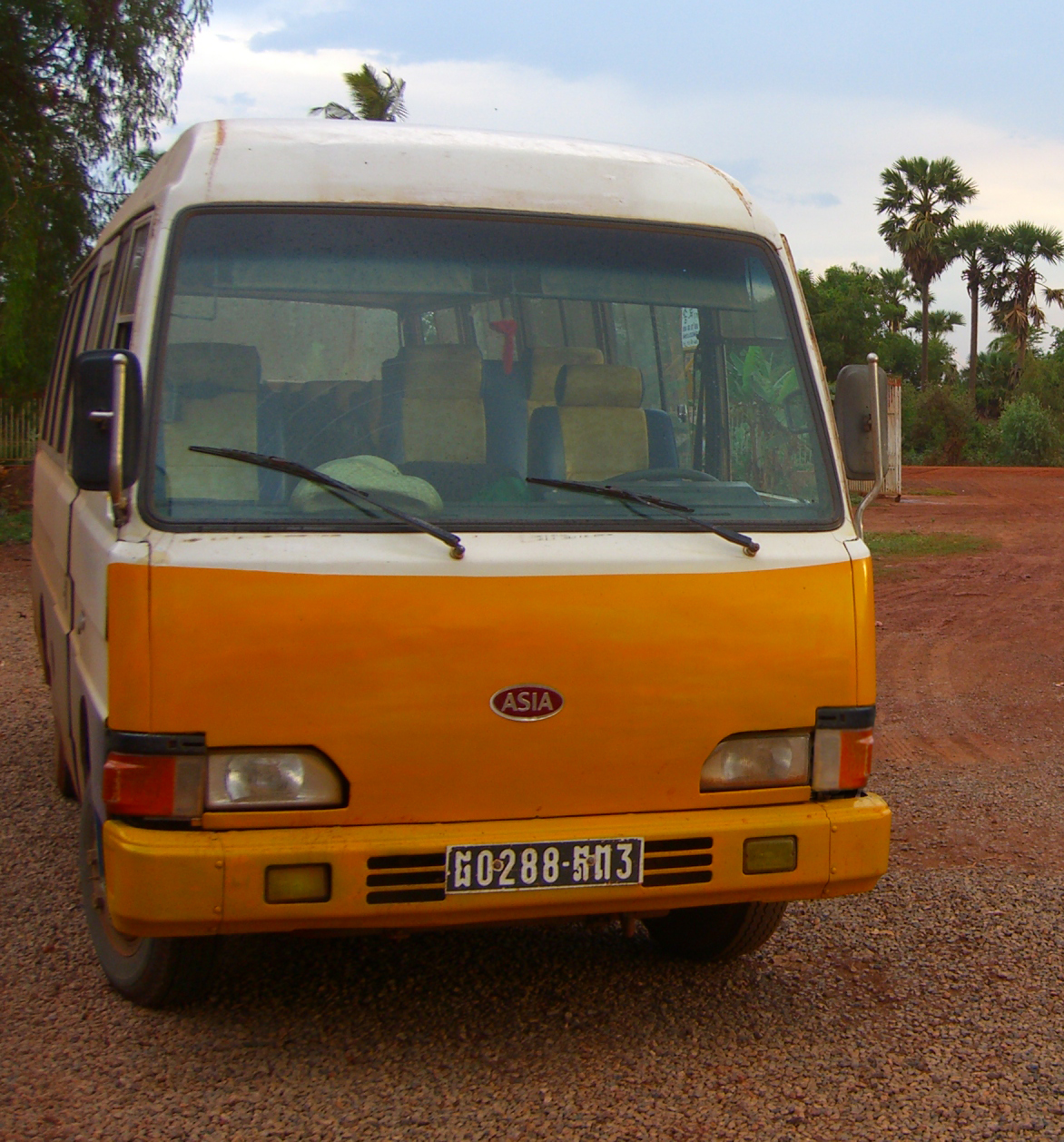

Overview
- Manufacturer: Asia Motors; Kia
- Also called: Asia Combi; Kia Power Combi
- Production: 1983-2002

Body and chassis
- Body style: bus
- Related: Mazda Titan; Mazda Parkway

Powertrain
- Engine: 2,977 cc Mazda HA diesel I4; 3,296 cc Hyundai D4AL TD I4; 3,749 cc VM 638 OHV diesel I6; 3,907 cc Hyundai D4DA TD I4; 4,052 cc Mazda ZB diesel I6

Dimensions
- Wheelbase: 4,015 mm
- Length: 6,300 mm
- Width: 2,000 mm
- Height: 2,680 mm

The Kia Combi (originally marketed as the Asia Combi) is a series of mini-buses built from 1983 until October 2002 by Asia Motors, and later Kia. Asia Motors has been owned by Kia since 1976.

In October 1983, the 24-seater Asia Motors AM805/807 "Combi" minibuses were launched, entering full production in 1984. Most versions received the Mazda ZB six-cylinder engine of 4,052 cc. This produced 100 PS (74 kW) at 3,600 rpm. They succeeded the first generation Mazda Parkway, while being based on the second generation Parkway (itself based on the second generation Mazda Titan). In 1988 or 1990 the twin headlights were changed, introducing single, "cats-eye" headlights (AM815). In 1994 the AM815 Hi-Combi was added to the lineup.

For the 1996 model year another modification took place, introducing more modern smaller four-cylinder Hyundai engines with more power as well as a re-designed dashboard. These later models (AM825) also feature twin round headlights. The new inline-four engines included Hyundai's new turbocharged 3.3 L D4AL and 3.9 L D4DA, producing 120 PS (88 kW) and 140 PS (103 kW) respectively. Following the 1999 merger of Kia and Hyundai, the Asia sub-brand had vanished by 2000. The vehicle was therefore rebadged as the Kia Power Combi. With stricter South Korean emissions regulations on the horizon for 2003, the Combi was then discontinued without a successor on October 28, 2002.

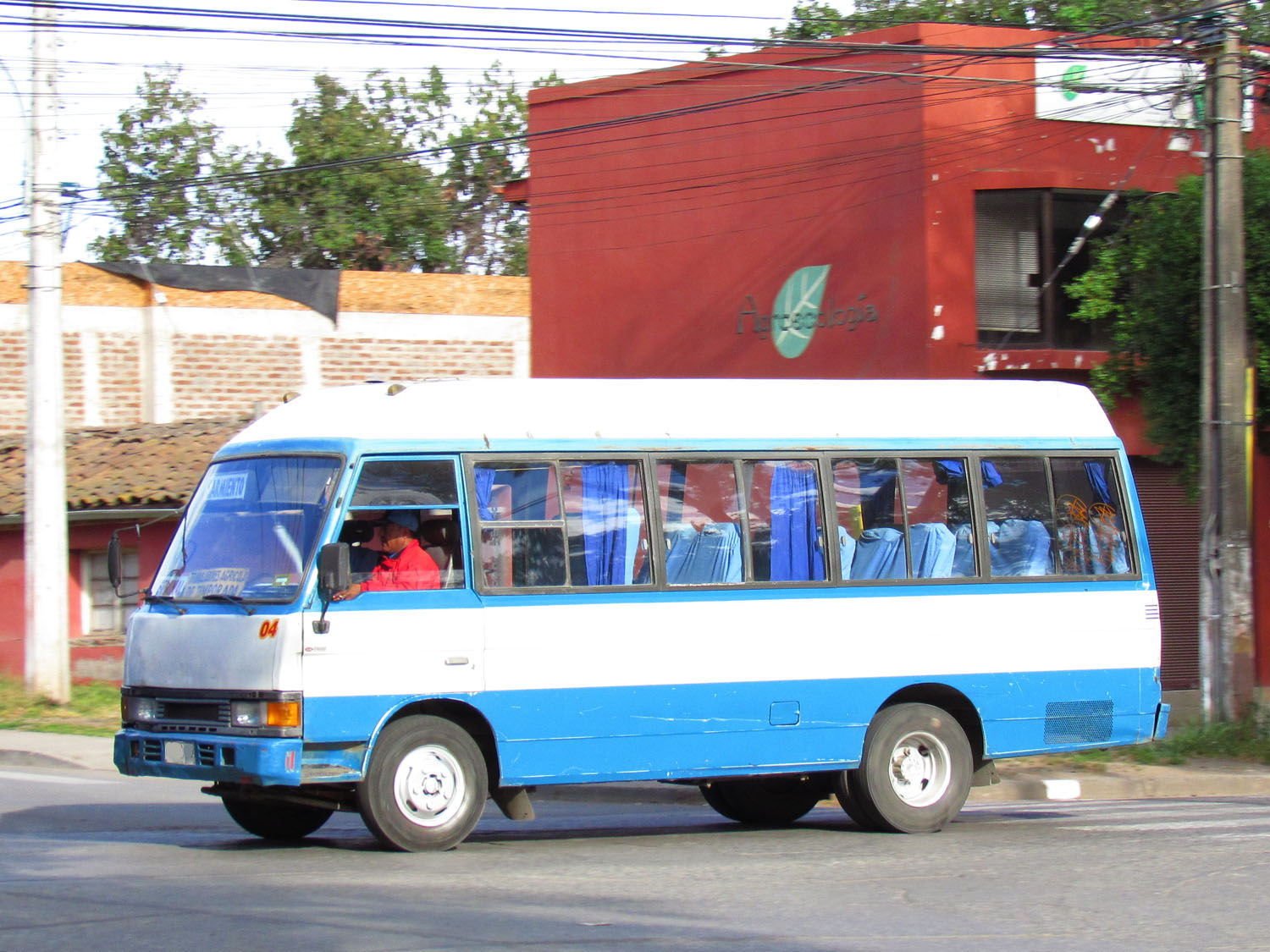
Asia Combi AM 815 1993 in Chile

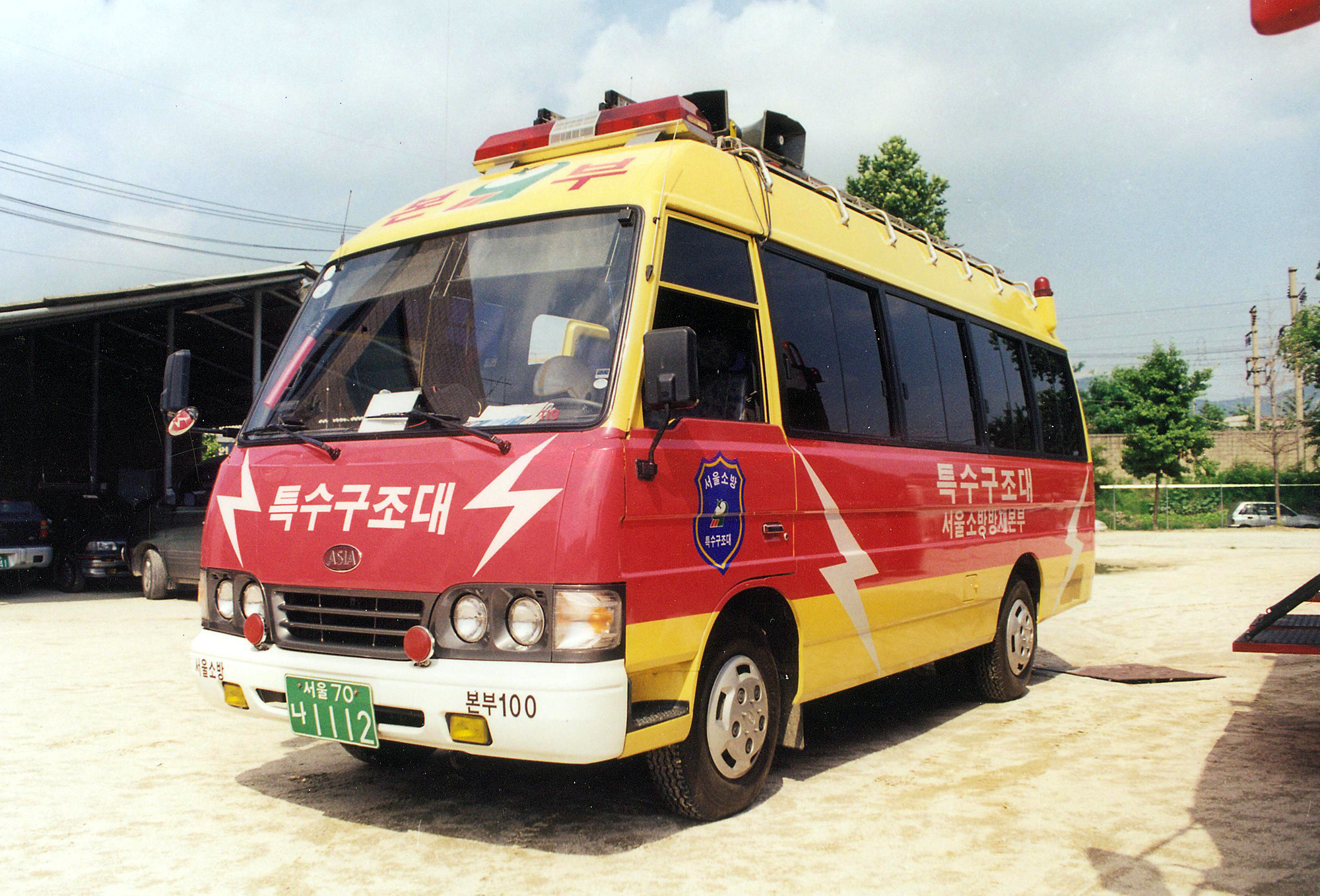
1996-2000 facelift model

== See also ==
- List of buses
