= Mazda Parkway =

Minibus

The Mazda Parkway is a minibus that was based on the Mazda Titan platform, and was manufactured at the Hiroshima Factory exclusively for the Japanese market.

There were two generations of the Parkway, from 1972 to 1982, and the type WVL from 1982 until 1997. It replaced the Mazda Light Bus that was previously built from 1965 until 1972. It was also available as the Kia Combi due to Mazda's partnership.

== Mazda Light Bus ==
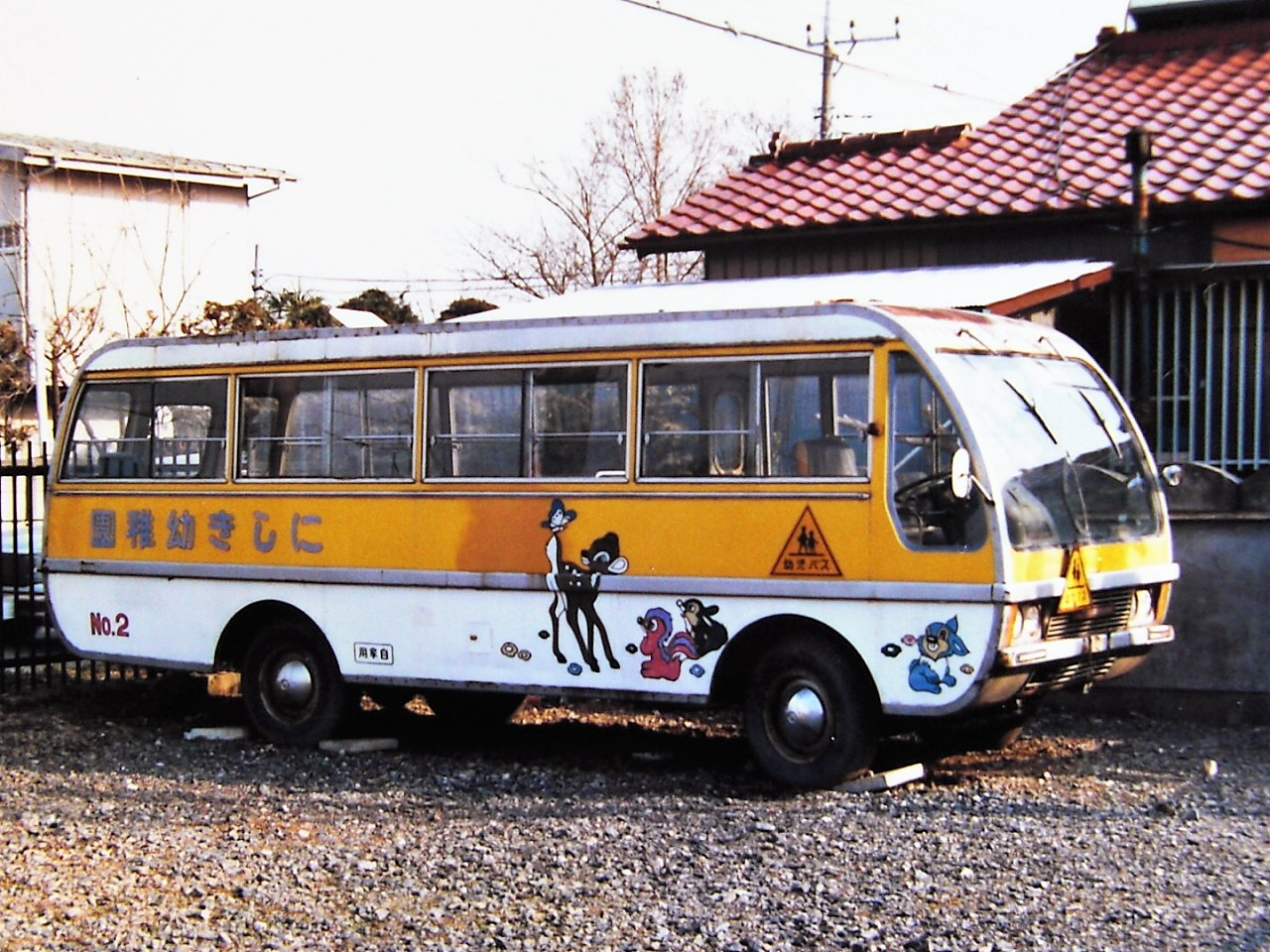
Mazda Light Bus Type A

The Mazda Light Bus, first shown at the 1964 Tokyo Motor Show, was built from May 1965 until April 1972. Based on the company's E2000 truck, it shared that model's 2-litre gasoline engine with 81 PS (60 kW). In 1967 a diesel-engined version was added to the lineup, the result of a technical collaboration with British diesel experts Perkins Engines. It was fitted with the Perkins-developed "XA", a 2.5 L (2,522 cc) unit rated at 77 PS (57 kW).

The Type A's distinct body, with a curved front windshield from laminated safety glass, has been dubbed "spaceship-like". The body was manufactured from a mix of aluminium and steel by Kawasaki Aircraft Industries. A more conventional looking, pressed-steel design, dubbed the Type C, appeared in 1966. This bodywork was manufactured by Nishinippon Industries.

== First generation (AE/VE; 1972) ==
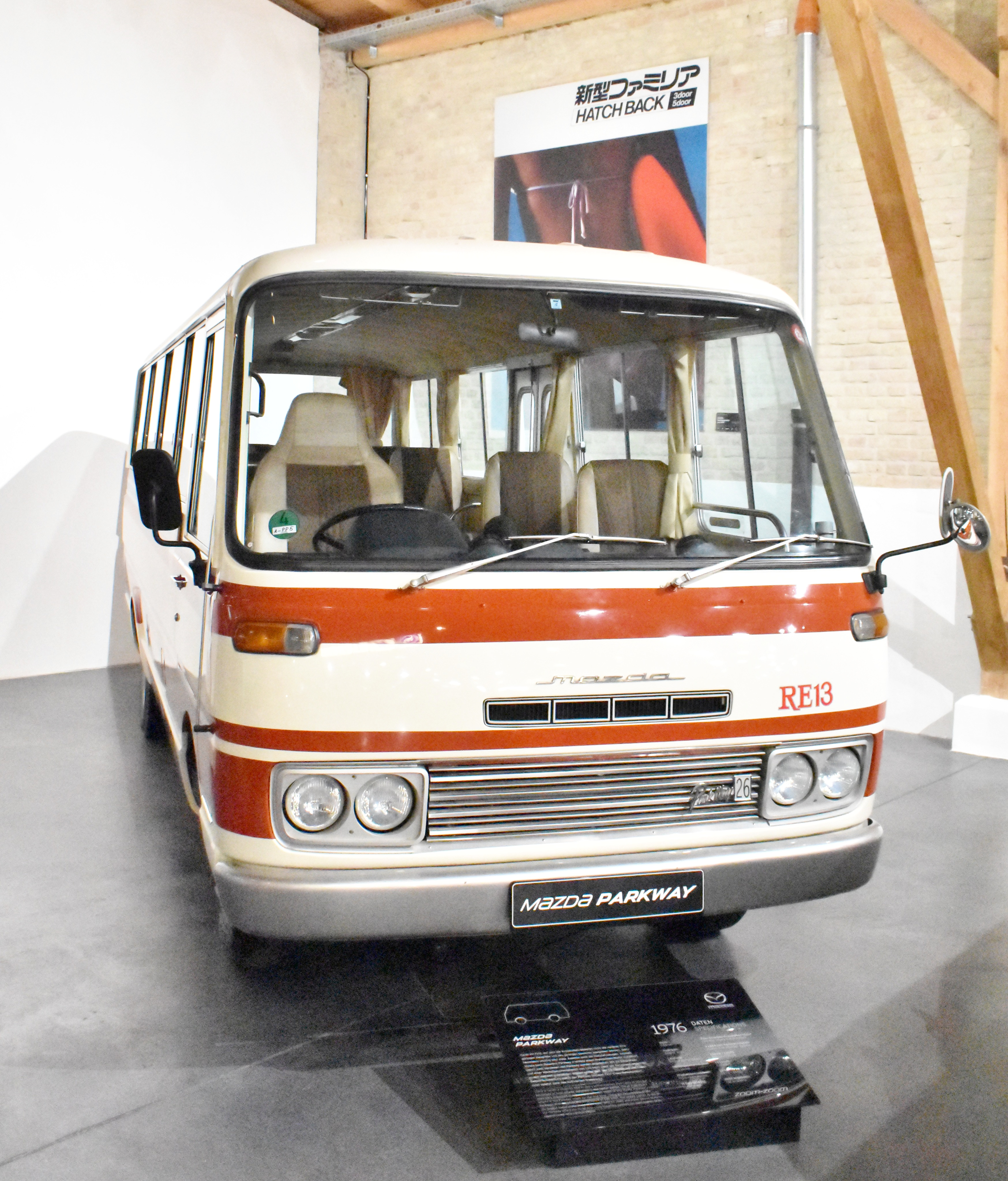
Mazda Parkway Rotary 26 (first generation)

The Parkway was a favorite with public transportation in southern Japan, such as Hiroshima and Hamamatsu in Shizuoka Prefecture, and competed with the Toyota Coaster, Nissan Civilian, Isuzu Journey, and Mitsubishi Fuso Rosa.

In 1974, the Parkway was available with the 13B rotary engine, in addition to the usual 2000 cc gasoline type "VA" and the 2522 cc type "XA" diesel engine. It also offered a novel transmission approach added to the manual transmission installed, called a sub transmission to cope with the load carrying requirements, and a fluid coupling to preventing engine stalling, knocking and oscillation. The rotary-powered minibus was called the Parkway Rotary 26, and could accommodate 26 passengers. It weighed 2,835 kg (6,250 lb) and could achieve a maximum speed of 120 km/h (75 mph), but was hampered by low torque and high fuel consumptions. It was introduced July 22, 1974 and discontinued in 1977, in favor of the considerably better selling diesel options. Only 44 examples were built. The Parkway Rotary was built only for the Japanese market.

== Second generation (WVL; 1982) ==
The rebodied, second generation Parkway bus was introduced in January 1982. It was based on the second generation Mazda Titan (introduced in October 1980) and used that models chassis, engines, front clip, and doors.

The type WVL bus was introduced to the Indian market by SML Isuzu (formerly Swaraj Mazda Limited) in 1986, badged as the T3500, and is still in production.

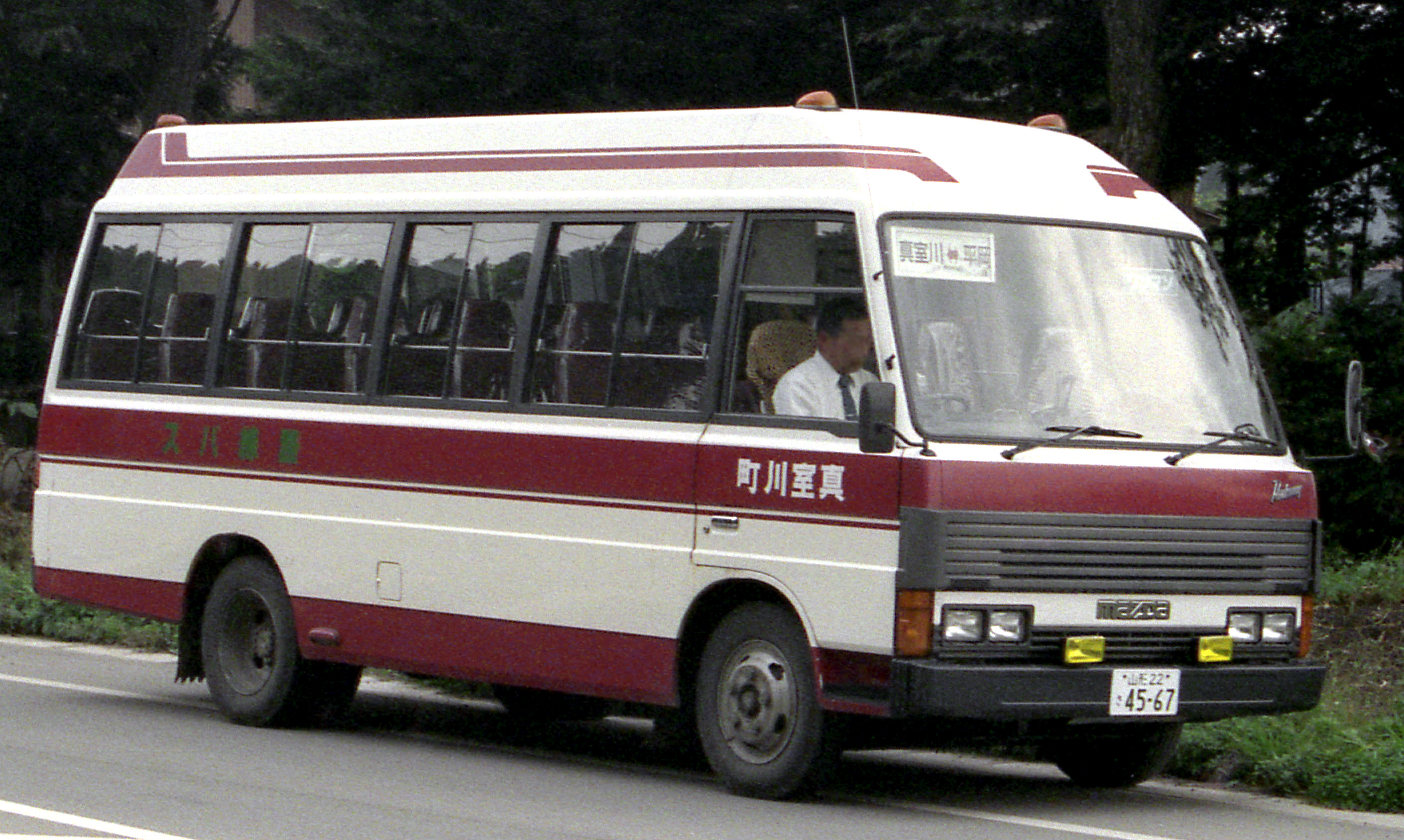
Mazda Parkway (second generation)

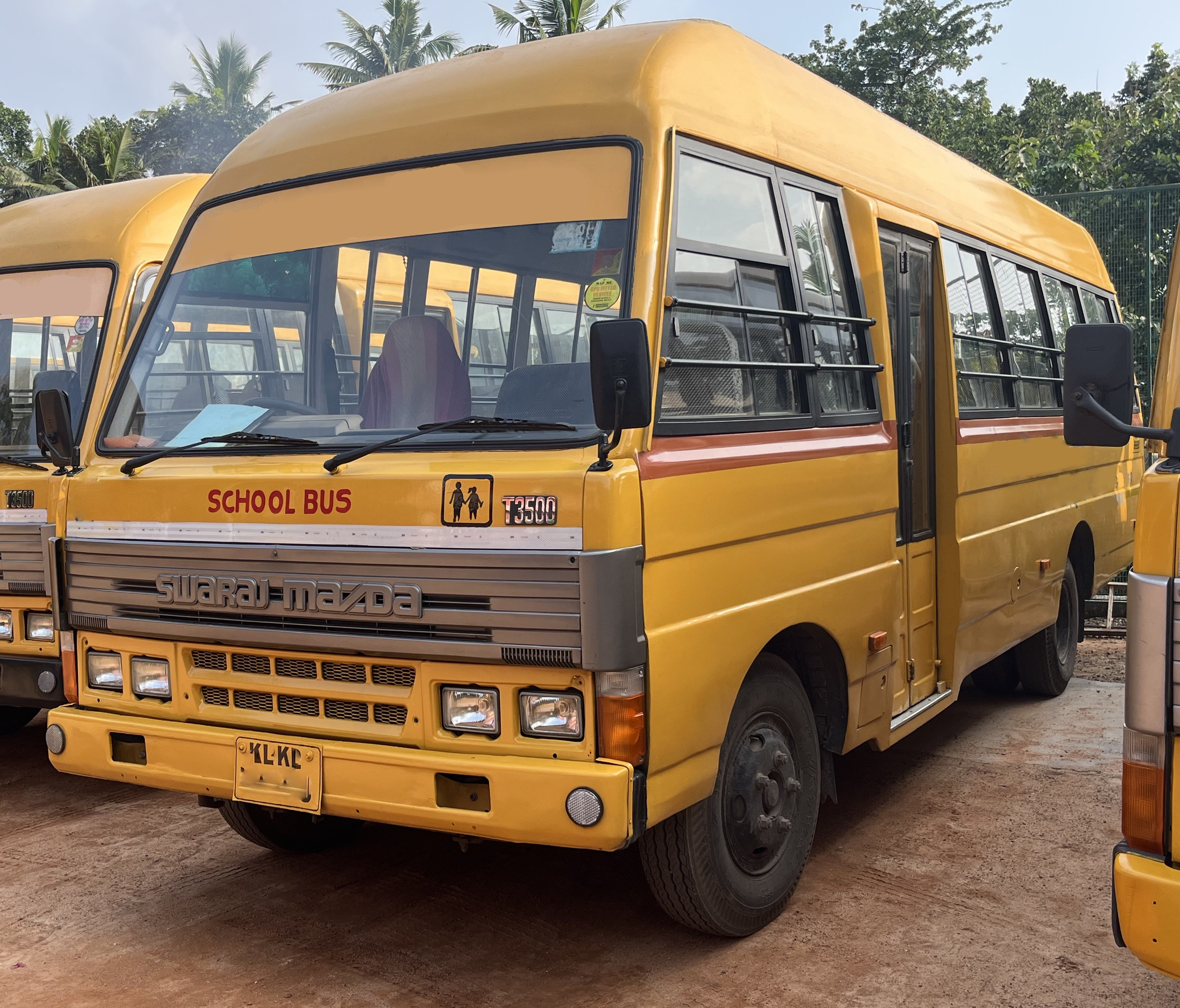
2010 Swaraj Mazda T3500
