= Arcabas =

French painter

Jean-Marie Pirot (December 26, 1926 – August 23, 2018), popularly known as Arcabas (a name given to him by his pupils), was a French contemporary sacred artist.

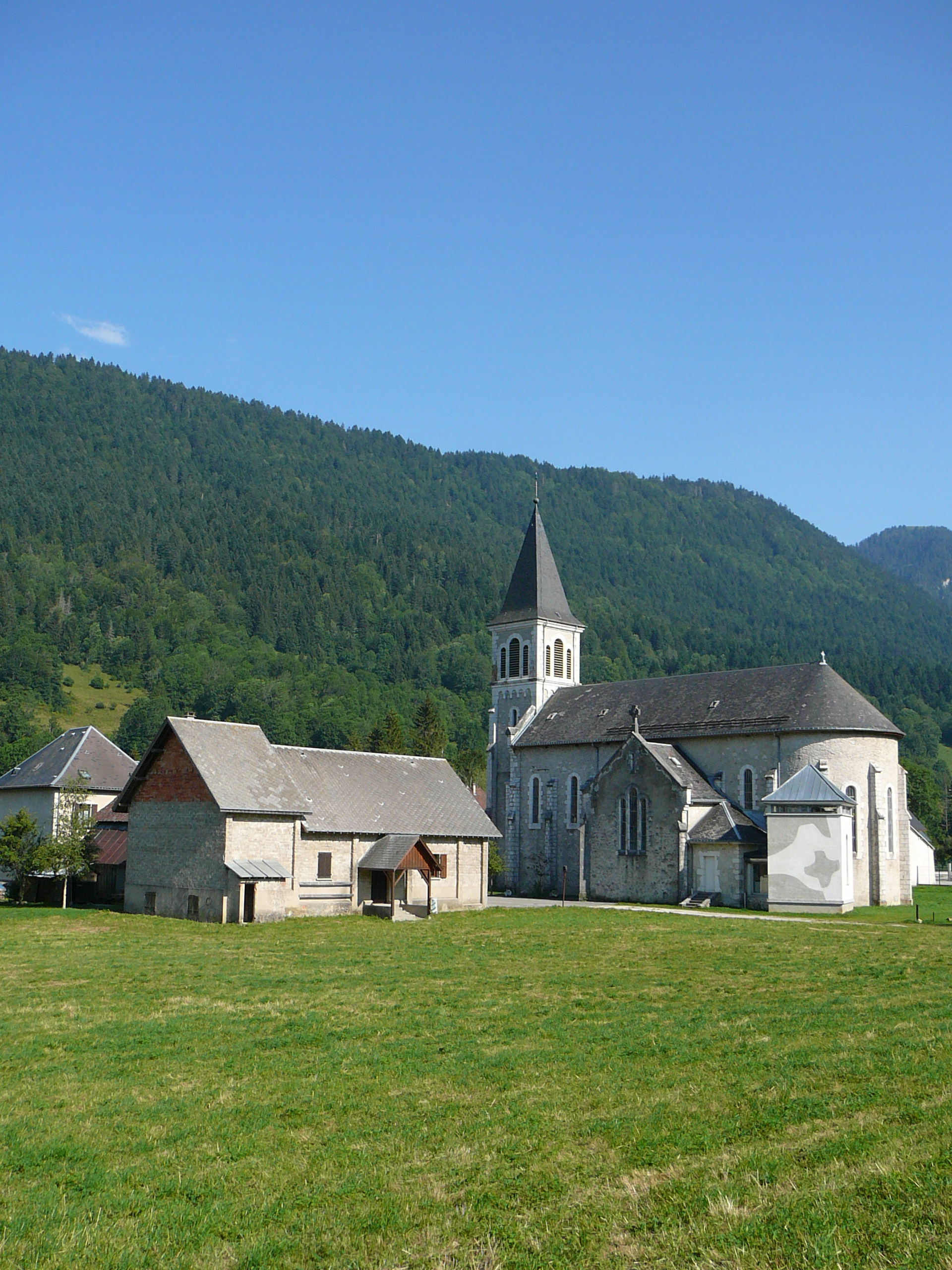
Saint-Hugues church

Pirot was born in Trémery. He studied in the École Nationale Supérieure des Beaux-Arts of Paris and taught in the École des Beaux-Arts of Grenoble. He became known for his works in Saint-Hugues-de-Chartreuse church. From 1969 to 1972, he was appointed guest artist by the Canadian government, and was a professor of the University of Ottawa, where he created "l’atelier collectif expérimental".

Later, back in France, he founded the atelier "Éloge de la Main". He received several orders from the French government and religious institutions. His works can be found in France, Germany, Mexico, Canada and the USA. He last lived in Saint-Pierre-de-Chartreuse, in Isère.

He used several techniques: sculpture, engraving, tapestry, mosaic or cabinet work, but specially painting. He also worked for theater making scenery and costumes.

His works were usually inspired by stories of the Bible.
