= Trémery =

- Commune
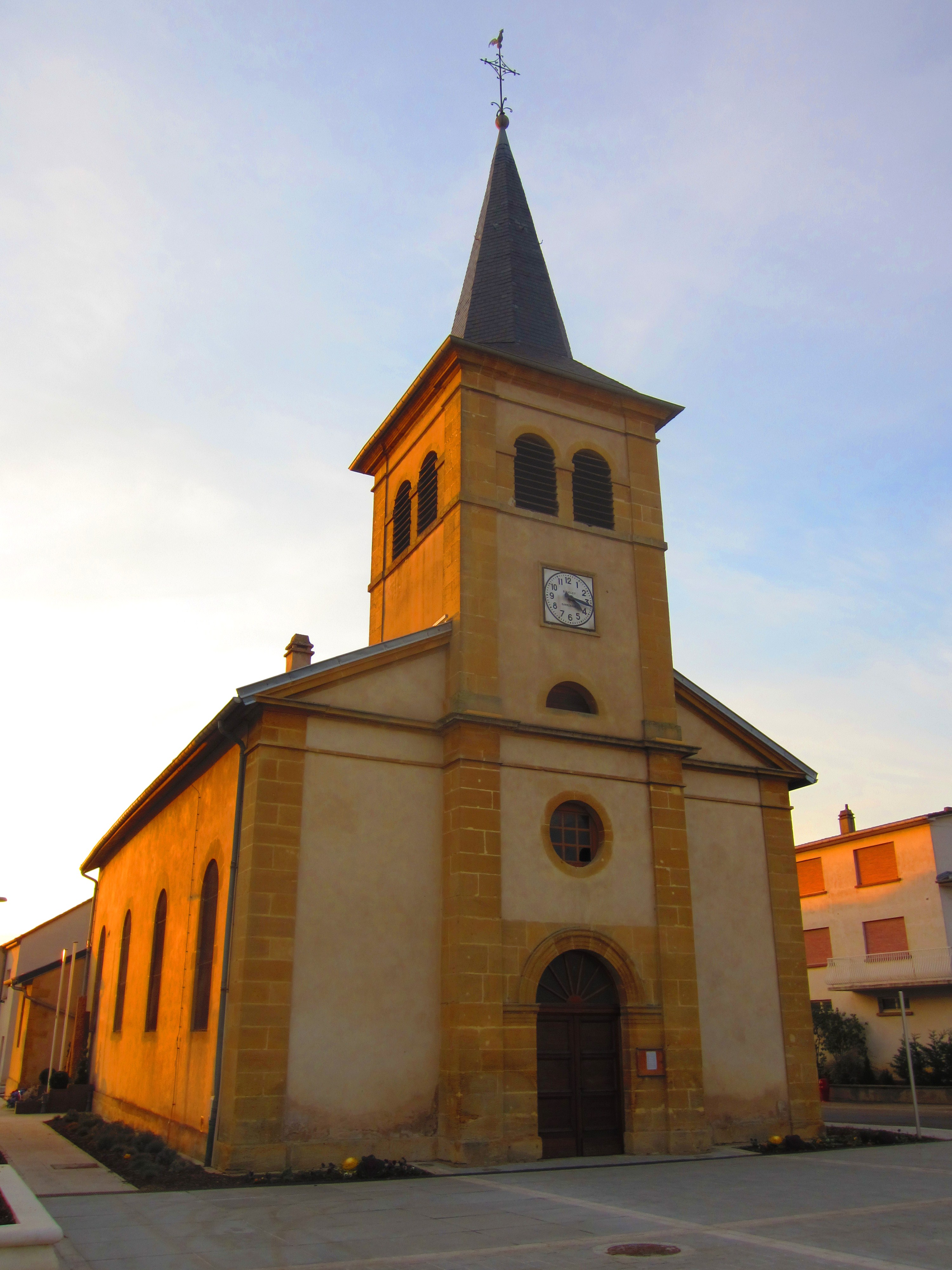
- The church in Trémery

- Coat of arms
- Location of Trémery
- Location within France Location within Grand Est
- Coordinates: 49°14′49″N 6°13′31″E
- Country: France
- Region: Grand Est
- Department: Moselle
- Arrondissement: Metz
- Canton: Le Pays Messin

Government
  - Mayor (2020–2026): Michel Hozé
- Area^{1}: 7.53 km^{2} (2.91 sq mi)
- Highest elevation: 238 m (781 ft)
- Lowest elevation: 160 m (520 ft)
- Population (2023): 965
  - Density: 128/km^{2} (332/sq mi)
- Demonym: Trémerois
- Time zone: UTC+01:00 (CET)
  - Summer (DST): UTC+02:00 (CEST)
- INSEE/Postal code: 57677 /57300
- ^{1} French Land Register data, which excludes lakes, ponds, glaciers > 1 km^{2} (0.386 sq mi or 247 acres) and river estuaries.

Trémery (French pronunciation: [tʁem(ə)ʁi]; German: Tremerchen) is a commune in the Moselle department in Grand Est in north-eastern France.

== Economy ==
- Usine PSA de Trémery (PSA factory of Trémery), the biggest diesel engine factory in the world.

== Notable citizens ==
Jean-Marie Pirot, known as Arcabas, contemporary sacred artist.

== See also ==
- Communes of the Moselle department
