= Mazda Titan =

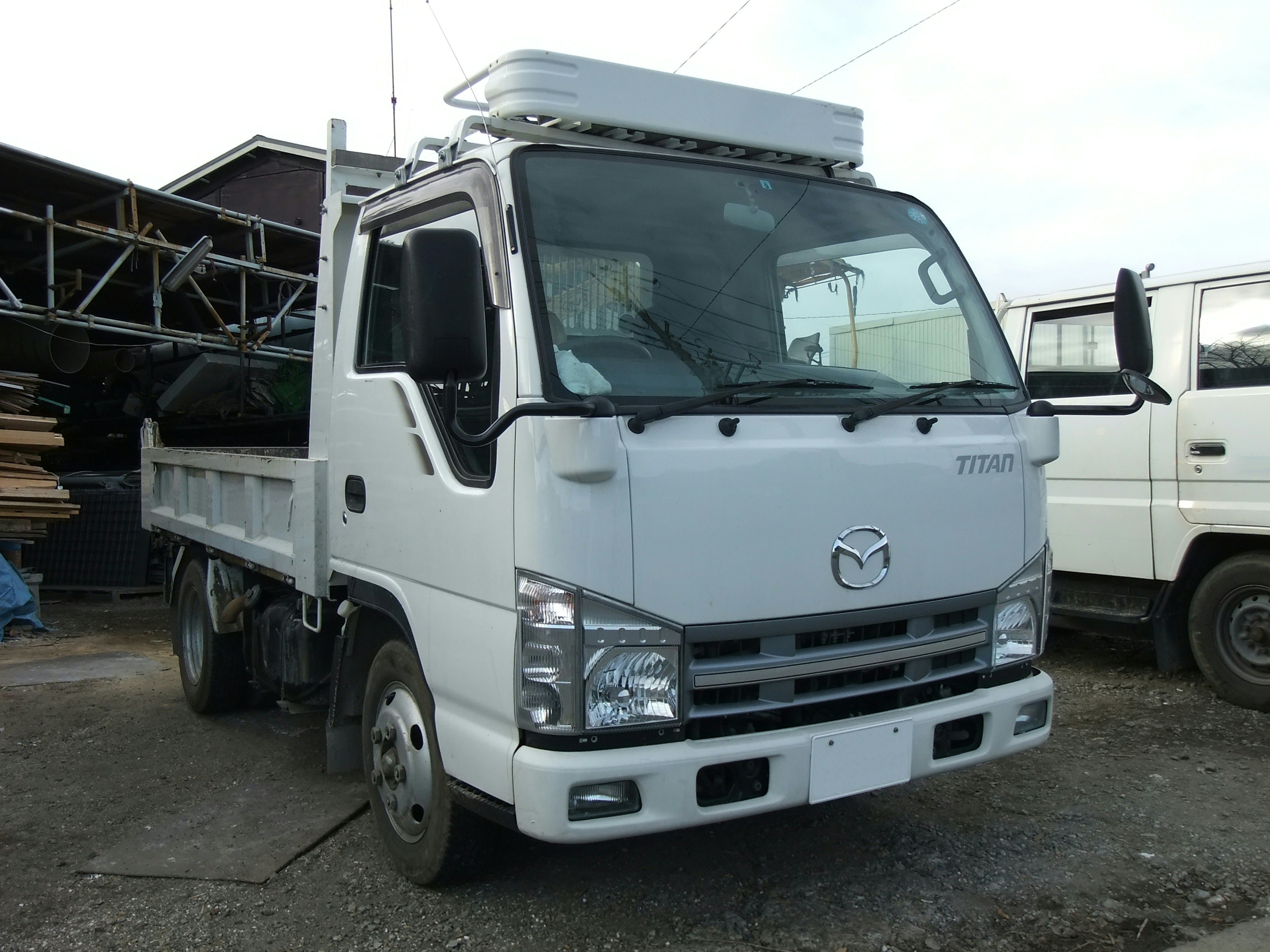

Overview
- Manufacturer: Mazda (1971–2004); Ford (1989–2004); Isuzu (2004–Present)
- Also called: Ford Trader; Mazda T-Series
- Production: 1971–present
- Assembly: Japan: Fuchu, Hiroshima

Body and chassis
- Class: Truck
- Body style: Truck (standard cab, crew cab)
- Related: Isuzu Elf; Mazda Parkway; Ford LCF

Chronology
- Successor: For Ford Trader (in export markets): Ford Transit; Ford Cargo

The Mazda Titan is a commercial truck produced by the Japanese automaker Mazda since 1971. From the fourth generation onwards, the vehicle had become a rebadged Isuzu Elf truck.

== Predecessor ==
Mazda's original entry into the mid-sized truck class was the Mazda E2000 in January 1964. This, in turn had replaced the earlier D series. The E2000 came with a standard bed ("EVA12"), with a three-way dropside bed ("EVA12S"), and as a long-wheelbase dropside ("EVA32S"). The truck had an 81 PS (60 kW), 2.0 L (1,985 cc) (VA) engine which had also been used in the earlier D2000. At the time of introduction, the production target was 1,900 units per month. In 1970 a version called the E2500 was added to the lineup. It was fitted with the Perkins-developed "XA", a 2.5 L (2,522 cc) diesel engine which was rated at 77 PS (57 kW). Its chassis code is "EXA".

== First generation (1971–1980) ==
First generation (pre-facelift)

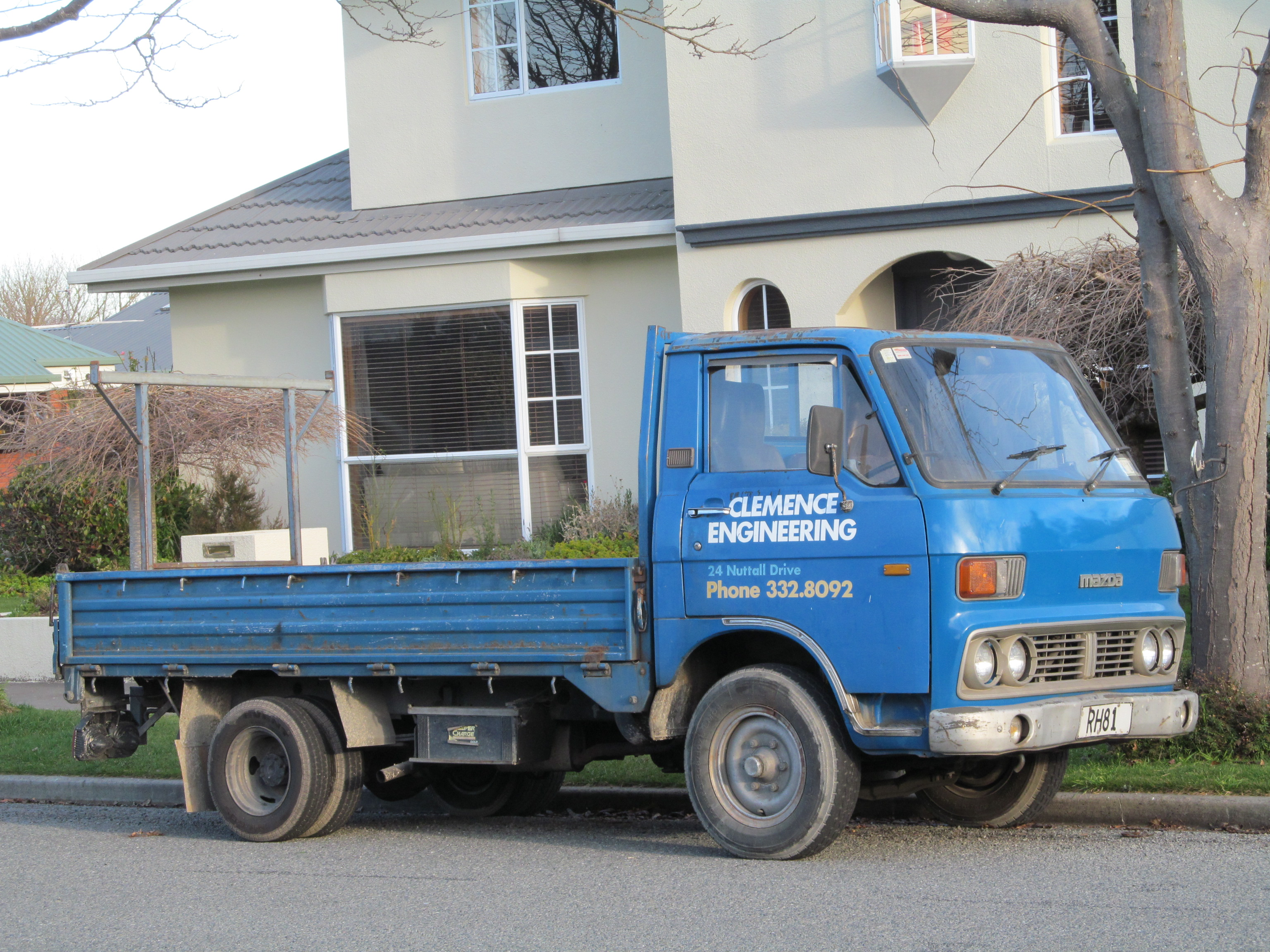
First generation (1977 facelift)

The first Titan was presented in 1971, as a successor to the two-ton Mazda E2000. The box-section chassis rails were unusual for the class. Receiving the chassis code "EXB", the tilt-cab Titan retained the 2.5-litre "XA" diesel engine of the earlier E2000 without any change. For heavier duty usage, there was also the XB-engined Titan T2700: a 2.7 L (2,701 cc) diesel version with four more horsepower (81 PS [60 kW]). A 2.0-litre petrol four cylinder engine was also available.

In 1977, the Titan underwent a minor change and facelift. Along with a new grille and bumpers with integrated fog lights, the turn signals were bigger and more squared off and incorporated vents for the cabin. Most obviously, the old round "M" logo was replaced by the new corporate "MAZDA" logo. The 2.7-litre diesel option was replaced by a 3-litre one, increasing power to 86 PS (63 kW). The interior was also updated, with all new seats, door panels, dashboard, and a new combination stalk for turn signals and wipers. Sales targets were 5,500 Titans per month.

This generation Titan was also the first to provide the basis for the Australian-market 3-tonne truck badged "Ford Trader". This generation was also made under license in South Korea by Kia, badged as the "Kia Titan". The Titan's chassis was shared with a minibus called the Mazda Parkway.

== Second generation (1980–1989) ==
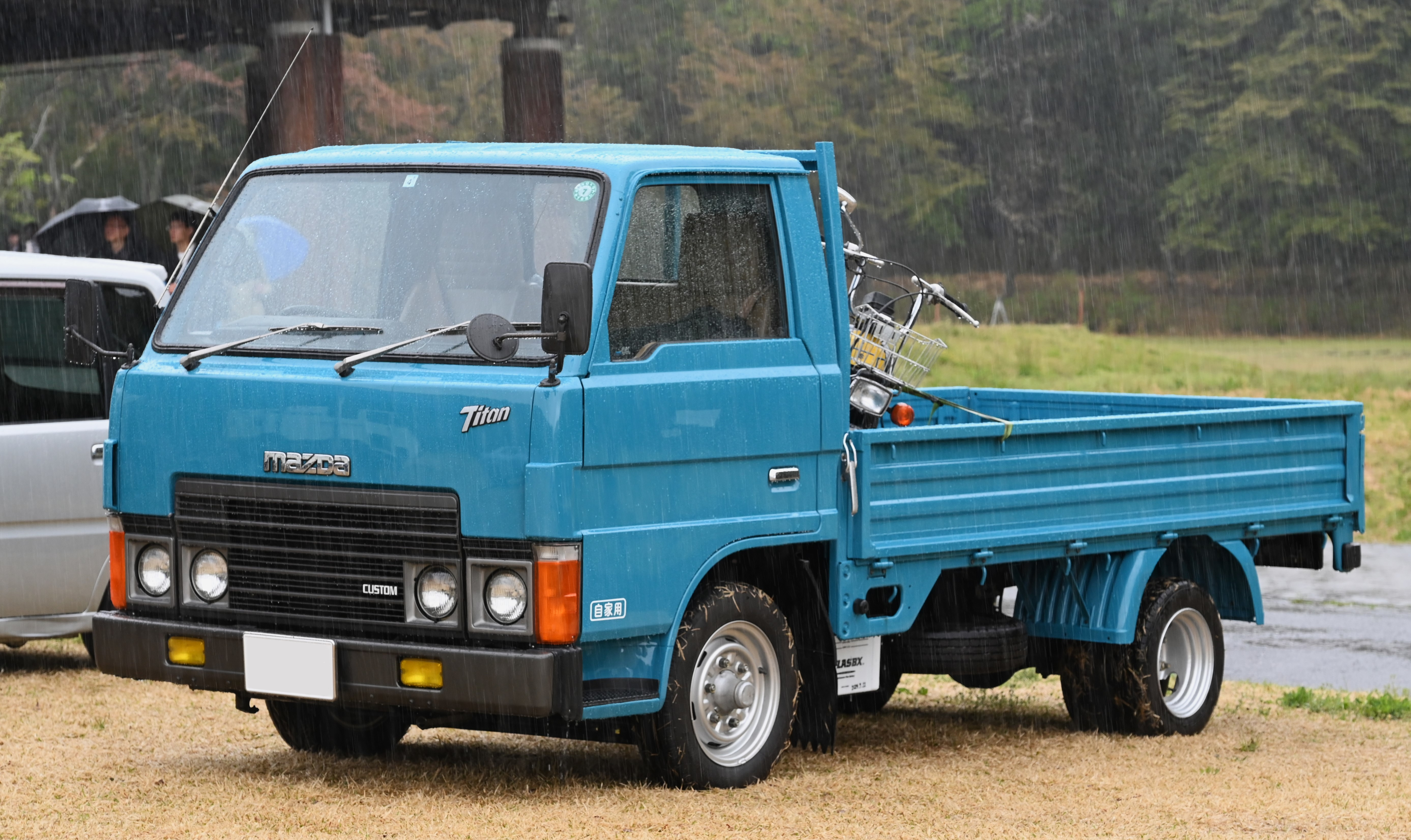
Pre-facelift model (1980–1984)

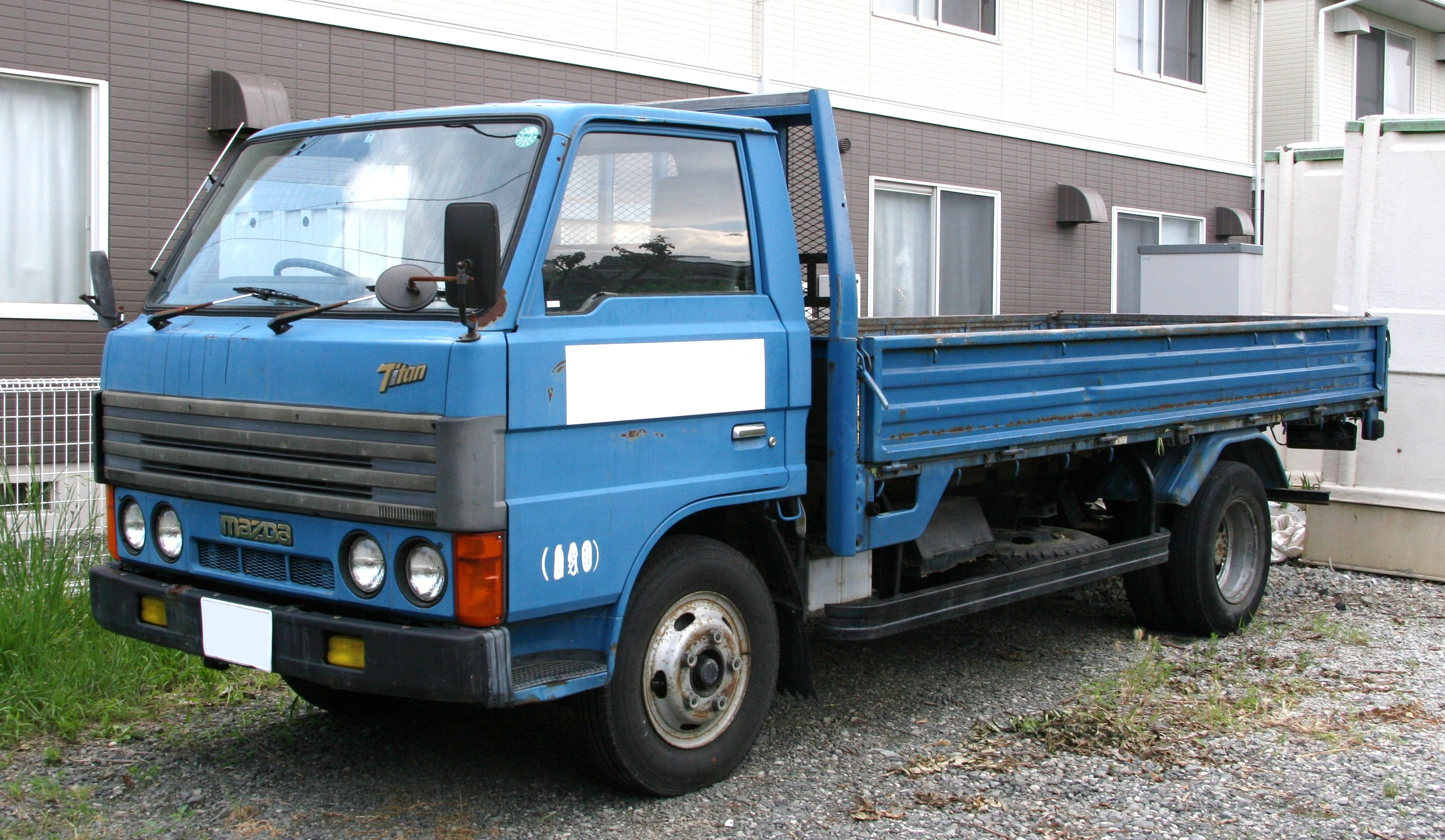
Second generation first facelift (1984–1987)

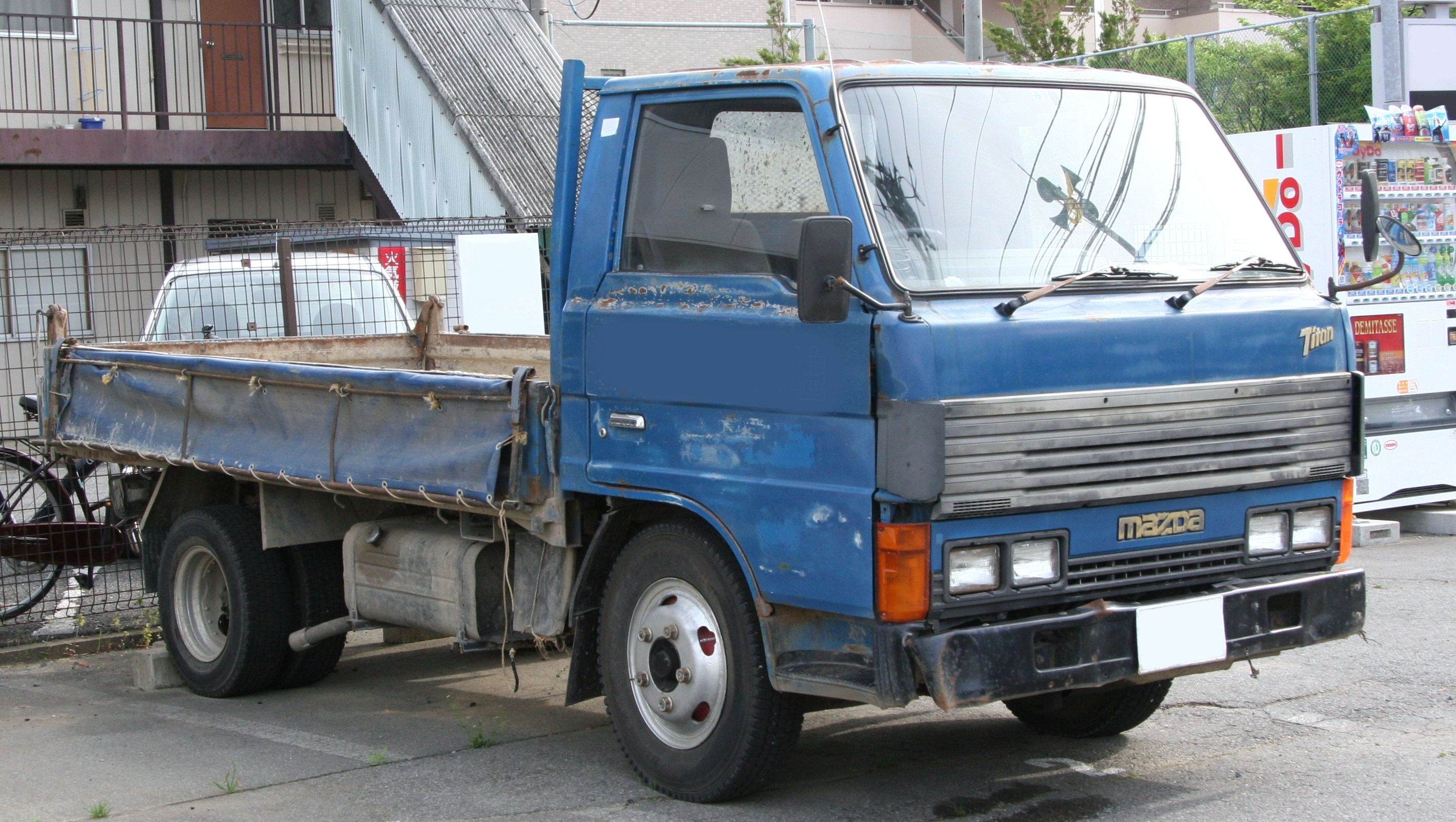
Second facelift (1987–1989)

The second generation was announced in October 1980. Engine capacity increased to 4052 cc with the introduction of the new, six-cylinder ZB diesel engine. 2.0, 2.5, and 3-liter four-cylinder models were also available. This model also received a dual range (ten-speed) transmission, marketed as the "Two Way Shift." In January 1982 the second generation Mazda Parkway bus version was introduced, based on the new Titan.

May 1984: Minor change, with a new front grille. Japanese market models were now also compliant with the 1983 emissions regulations.

1987: Minor change. As part of the facelift, the four round headlights were changed to four square units of standard type. A DIN-standard audio space is provided.

The Mazda Titan also appeared in export markets as the Mazda T2000, T2500, T3000 or the Mazda T4100. It was also license built in India under Swaraj Mazda, beginning in 1985 (trial production) and 1986 (full production). The company was renamed SML Isuzu in 2010 and the truck is marketed under SMLI.

== Third generation (1989–2000) ==
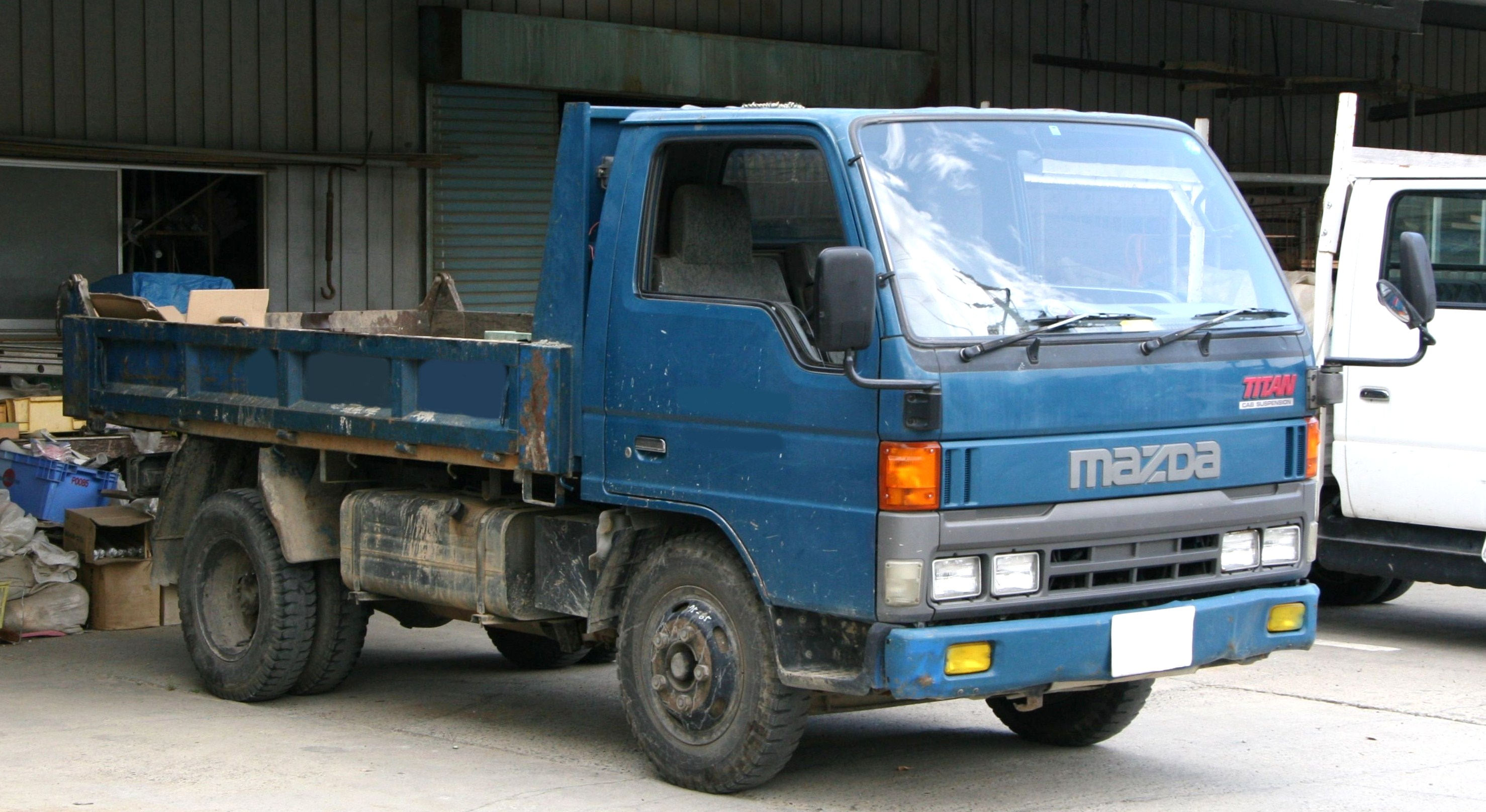
Third generation (second facelift; 1995–1997)

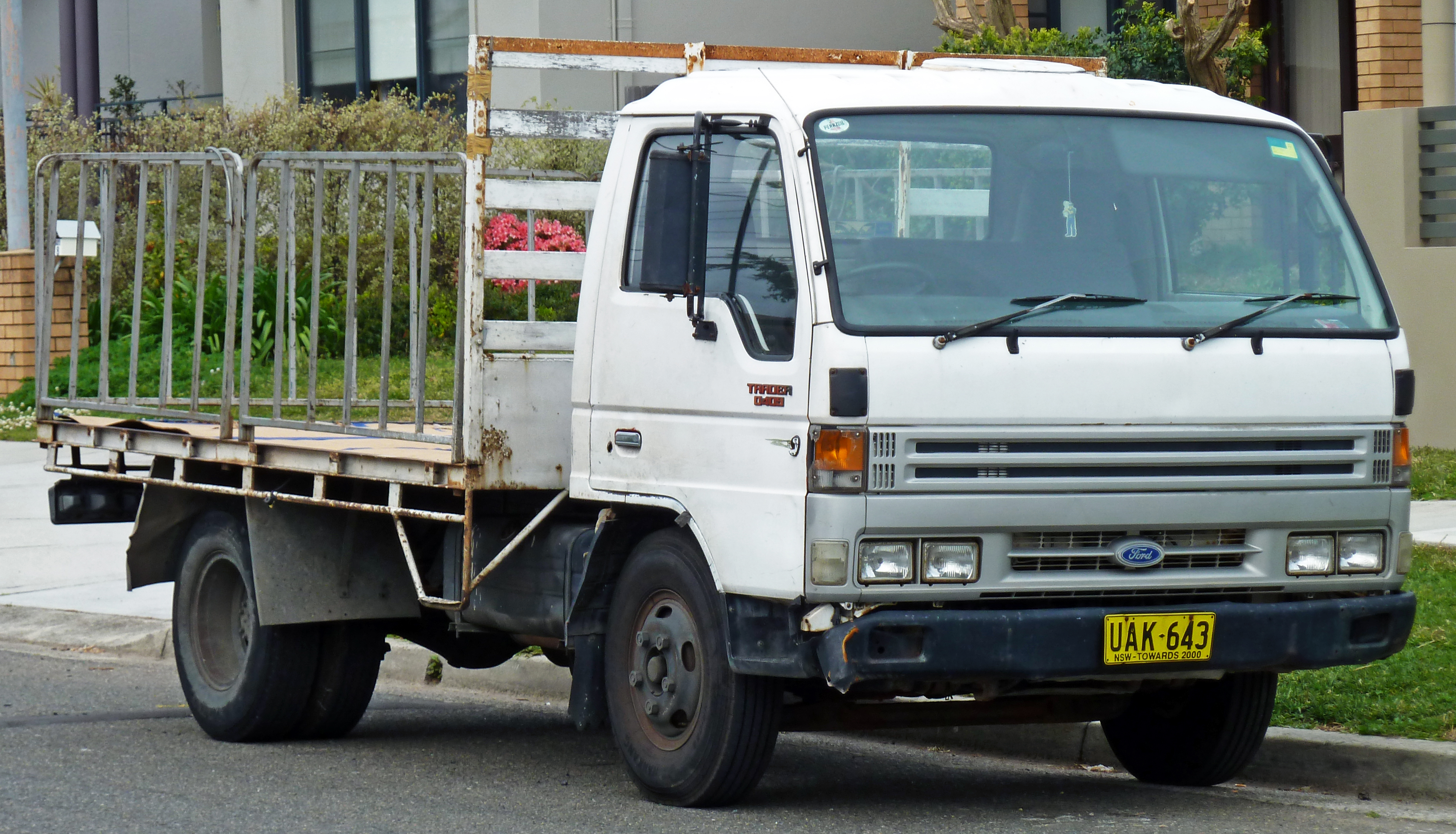
1989–1998 Ford Trader 0409 (Australia)

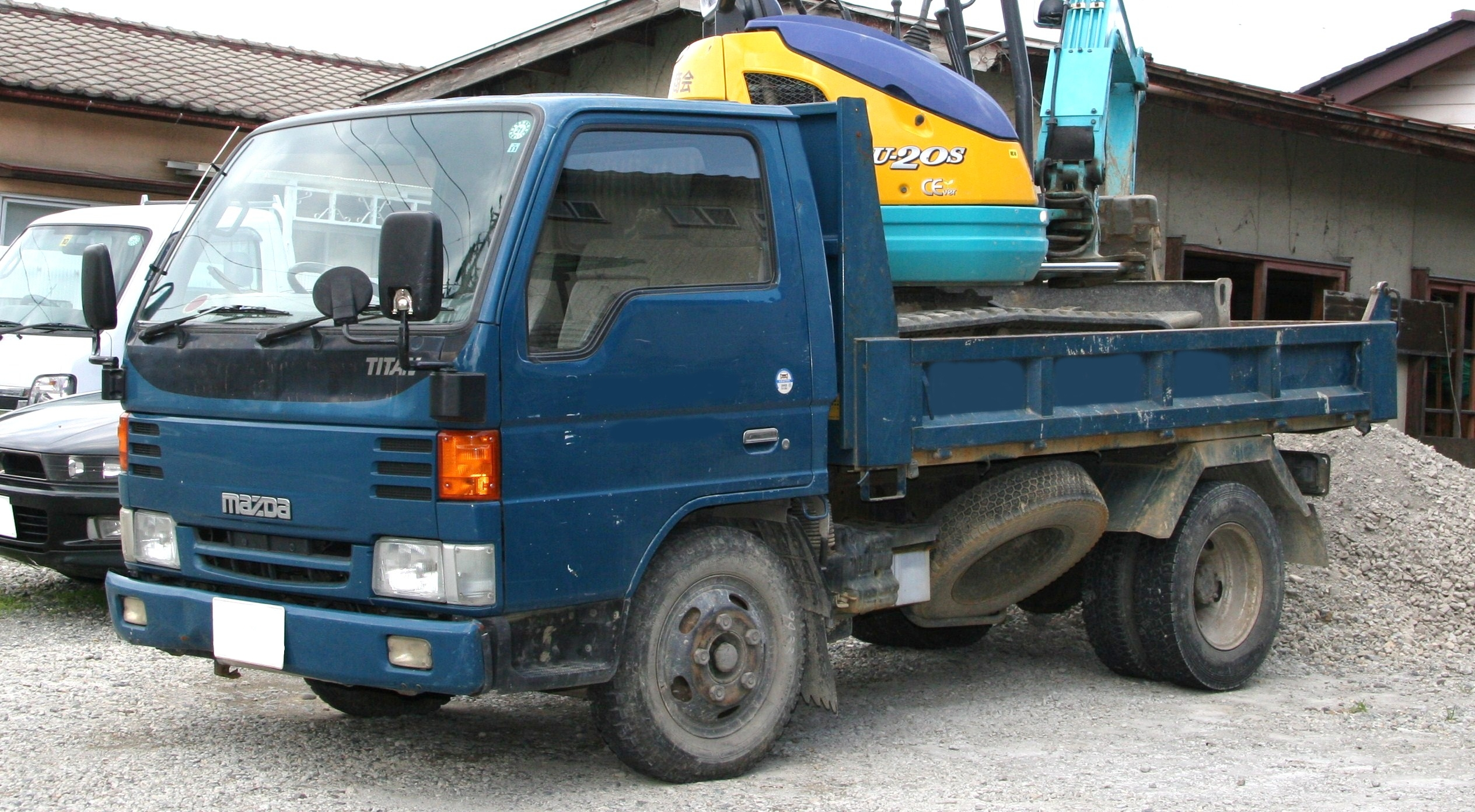
Third generation (third facelift; 1997–2000)

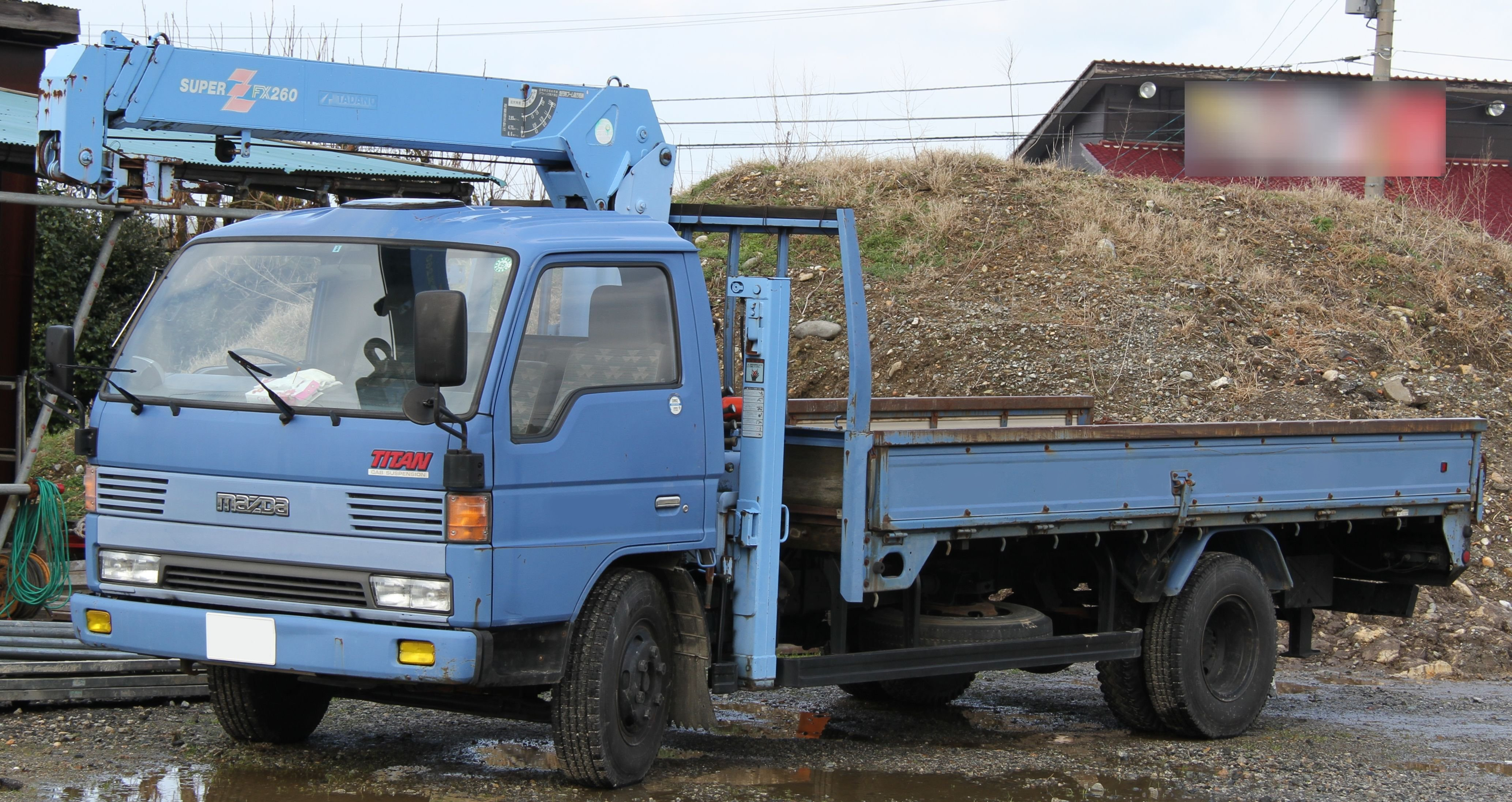
Third generation (first facelift; 1992–1995)

The third generation Titan was announced in 1989. The truck received all-new bodywork, albeit still rather similar looking. The biggest difference is that the side windows received a pronounced dip at the leading edge, to allow the driver better visibility. The "Titan" logos were changed to all-caps. The new Titan also received mudguards, with prominent "Titan" script. In 1992, the Titan underwent a minor facelift, softening the design somewhat.

In 1995, the Titan received another facelift although there were also some mechanical changes this time: To be compliant with the stricter 1994 emissions standards, Mazda had to replace the higher output engines with Isuzu's 4HF1 and 4HG1 engines. The Mazda logo was made considerably larger.

In October 1997, a third facelift was implemented. The front was rounded off, with the windscreen made to look larger by placing a piece of black plastic beneath it. The four square lamps were replaced by more irregularly shaped single units which wrap around the corners. The Titan logo was changed from red to white characters.

In May 1999, the 1998 emissions standards were met - except for the four-litre version, which did not become compliant until November.

In export markets, the Titan was sold as the Mazda T series and Ford Trader. Buyers had a choice of rear ends that included ute bed, tray top, and a box which included a hydraulic lifting tray. The choice of motor was either a four or six-cylinder diesel (some of which are of Perkins origin) or a petrol engine with either four or six cylinders.

== Fourth generation (2000–2010) ==
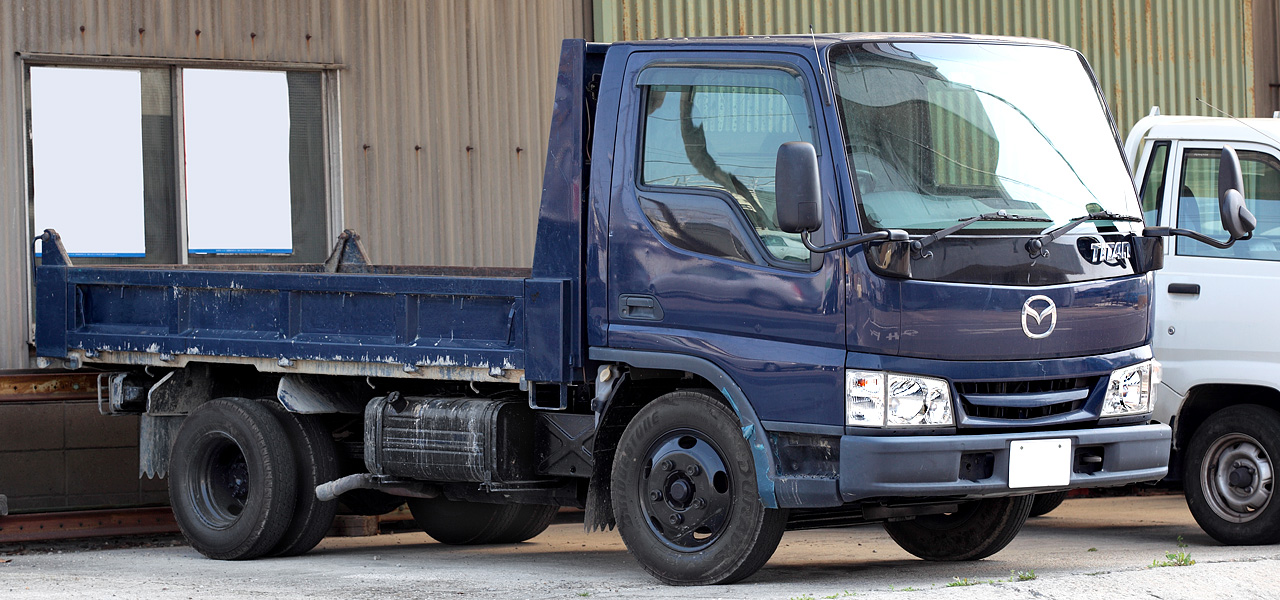
Fourth generation

The fourth generation Titan was launched on May 4, 2000.

On October 25, 2000, the 1-ton payload Titan Dash was launched, replacing the Bongo Brawny truck. In November, CNG powered versions were added to the range.

On June 24, 2004, the fifth generation of the Titan was launched, built by Isuzu (see below). The Titan (from 1.5- to 4-ton payload) became a rebadged Isuzu Elf. The 1-ton Titan Dash remained in production alongside the new variant. In December, the Diesel versions adopted the Bongo's DPF-equipped 2.0 litre turbo-diesel engine, in order to meet new short-term emission regulations. A driver's seat airbag became standard equipment across the Titan Dash range.

In August 2007, Diesel versions became compliant with the new long-term emission regulations for compact vans and trucks with a loading capacity of 1 ton or less, due to changes in the compression ratio and DPF capacity. The Titan Dash was discontinued in 2010.

== Fifth generation (2004–2007) ==
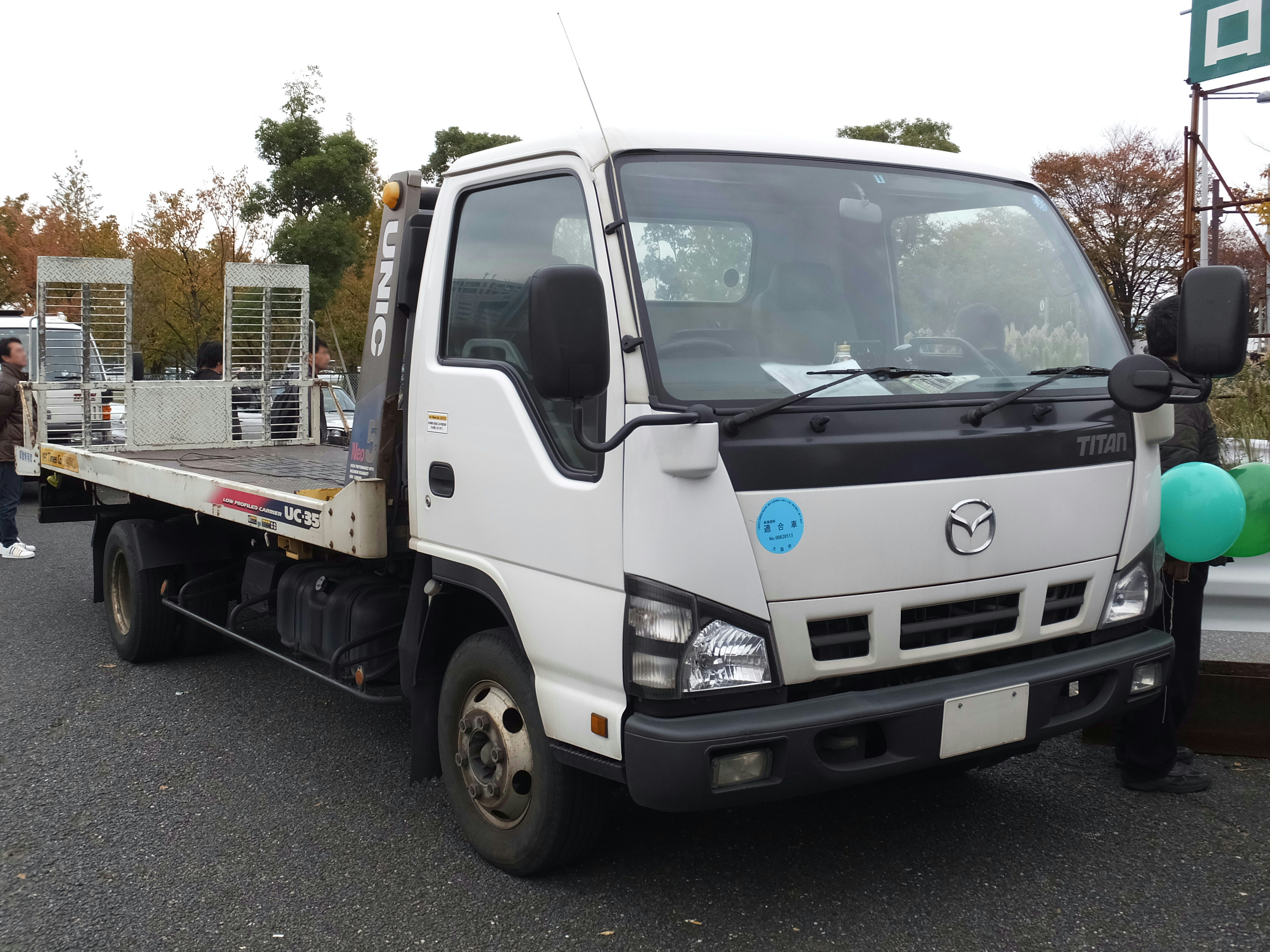
Mazda Titan (fifth generation)

In June 2004 the fifth generation Titan was introduced, this version was an OEM-supplied Isuzu Elf. The previous generation Titan was the last 1.5-4t truck developed by Mazda, and saw an uncommonly short production run of only four years - the production life of a truck in the Japanese market usually being around 10 years. The lighter one-tonne Titan Dash of the previous generation continued to be built alongside the new model.

The Isuzu-built Titan featured three Diesel options, 3.1 L, 4.8 L and 4.8 L turbo, in addition to LPG and CNG engines. 4-wheel drive versions and crew cabs were also available.

== Sixth generation (2007–2023) ==
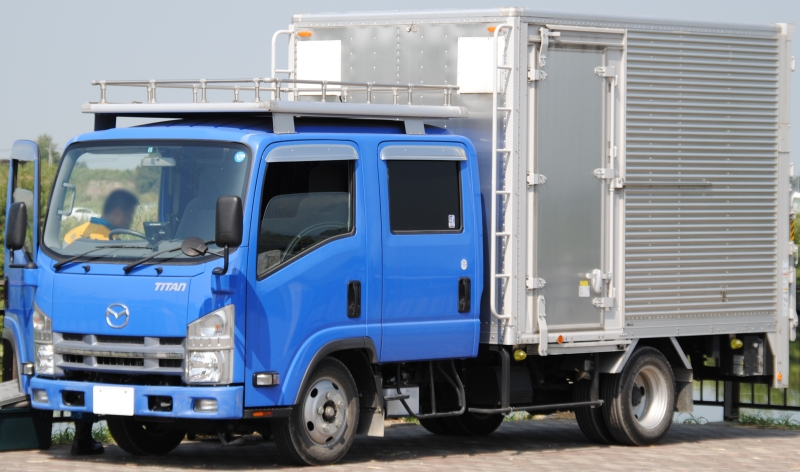
Sixth generation

In January 2007, the sixth generation of the Titan was launched for the Japanese market featuring a newly designed body, Mazda's auto start-stop system, a new range of engines and lighter body panels. The target sales volume was limited to 430 units per month.

== Seventh generation (2023–present) ==
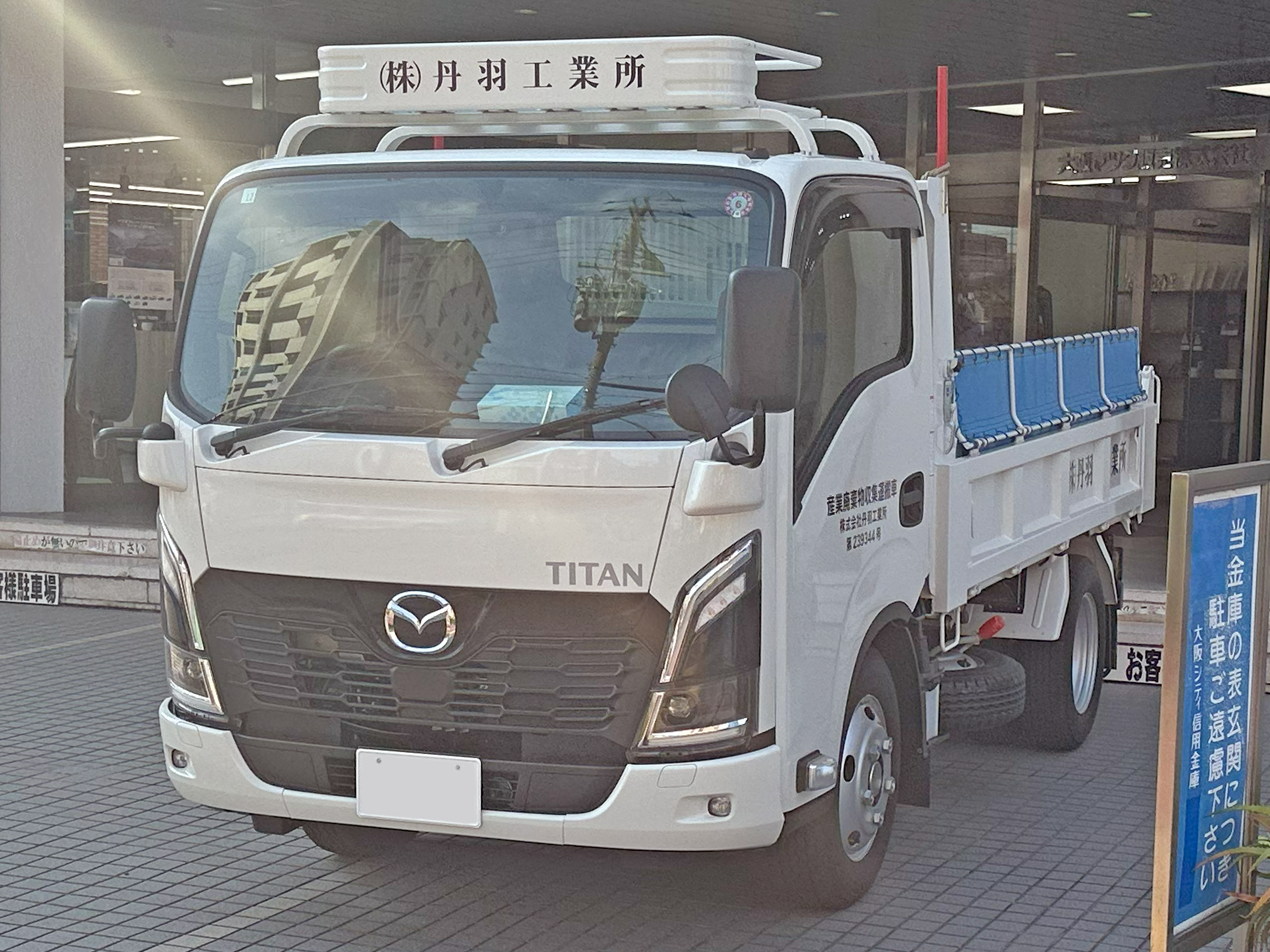
Seventh generation
