= Mazda OHV engine =

Overview
- Manufacturer: Mazda

Layout
- Configuration: Straight-2 & straight-4
- Displacement: 0.4 L (358 cc); 0.6 L (586 cc); 0.8 L (782 cc); 1.0 L (987 cc); 1.2 L (1,169 cc); 2.0 L (1,985 cc)
- Cylinder bore: 46 mm (1.8 in); 54 mm (2.1 in); 58 mm (2.3 in); 68 mm (2.7 in); 70 mm (2.8 in); 75 mm (3.0 in); 82 mm (3.2 in)
- Piston stroke: 54 mm (2.1 in); 64 mm (2.5 in); 68 mm (2.7 in); 74 mm (2.9 in); 76 mm (3.0 in); 84 mm (3.3 in); 94 mm (3.7 in)
- Valvetrain: OHV
- Compression ratio: 8.5:1, 8.6:1, 9.0:1

Combustion
- Fuel system: Hitachi/Stromberg carburettor
- Fuel type: Gasoline
- Cooling system: Water-cooled

Output
- Power output: 33–92 PS (24–68 kW)
- Torque output: 39.2 N⋅m (29 lb⋅ft)

After an early flirtation with V-twin engines, Mazda's small cars of the 1960s were powered by OHV straight-2 and straight-4 engines. This family lasted from 1961 until the mid-1970s. Today, Mazda's keicars use Suzuki engines. It was produced at the Hiroshima Plant in Hiroshima, Japan.

== AA ==
The engine was a two-stroke, water-cooled straight-twin engine used in the Mazda Chantez and Mazda Porter kei car and truck unique to Japan from 1972 until 1976. The displacement is 359 cc (21.9 cu in), producing 24.3 kW (33 PS) and 39.2 N⋅m (29 lb⋅ft) of torque.

== DA/DB ==
The 358 cc (21.8 cu in) water-cooled OHV straight-four DA engine, used in the 1962 P360 Carol had a tiny 46 mm × 54 mm (1.8 in × 2.1 in) bore and stroke. This was one of the smallest production four-cylinder automobile engines in history, only beaten by Honda's 356 cc (21.7 cu in) inline-four unit used in the T360 truck. The engine's small size was dictated by Japan's kei car rules which offered special status to vehicles with engines displacing less than 360 cc (22 cu in). Mazda's tiny OHV was the only four-cylinder in the class in the 1960s, but was outperformed by 2-stroke and I3 powerplants from other companies.

When fitted to the B360/Porter light truck and van, the engine received the DB engine code.

== RA ==
The 586 cc (35.8 cu in) RA engine was a larger version of the 358 cc (21.8 cu in) engine 54 mm × 64 mm (2.13 in × 2.52 in). It was used in the 1962-1964 P600 Carol and produced 28 PS (21 kW) and 4.2 kg⋅m (41 N⋅m; 30 lb⋅ft) of torque.

== SA ==
The SA, a larger 782 cc (47.7 cu in) engine powered the 1963-1967 Mazda Familia and the 1966 Mazda Bongo. Bore and stroke was 58 mm × 74 mm (2.28 in × 2.91 in) for this water-cooled OHV engine. In the Familia, the SA produces 42 PS (31 kW) at 6,000 rpm, while the Bongo received a detuned version with 37 PS (27 kW) at 5,000 rpm. For 1966 and 1967, the max power of the SA mounted in the Familia increased to 45 PS (33 kW) (at the same engine speed), by increasing the compression ratio from 8.5:1 to 9.0:1.

== PB ==
The 1.0 L (987 cc) PB engine, a separate development, used a square 68 mm (2.68 in) bore and stroke. It was a water-cooled OHV engine and first powered the 1967 Mazda Familia 1000. Output ranged from 52 to 58 PS (38 to 43 kW), depending on the application.

- Jan 1967 - Feb 1968 Mazda Familia 1000 Sedan, Van (Mazda 1000)
- Nov 1967 - 1973 Mazda Familia 1000 (Mazda 1000)

== TB ==
One of the more-popular variants of this family was the 1.2 L (1,169 cc) TB unit found in the Familia/1200. Bore and stroke was 70 mm × 76 mm (2.76 in × 2.99 in). The 1200 Coupé used a Hitachi/Stromberg carburettor and 8.6:1 compression to produce 68 PS (50 kW) at 6000 rpm and 9.6 kg⋅m (94 N⋅m; 69 lbf⋅ft) at 3000 rpm. This engine was built from 1968 until 1970 for passenger cars, until 1971 for the Familia Truck.

== UA/UB ==
The UA (and the similar UB, for use in three-wheeled trucks) is a 1484 cc water-cooled overhead valve inline-four engine. It has a bore of 75 mm (3.0 in) and a stroke of 84 mm (3.3 in). As installed in the original 1960 D1500 four-wheel truck, equipped with a sidedraft carburetor, it has a maximum horsepower of 60 PS (44 kW) at 4600 rpm and a maximum torque of 10.4 kg⋅m (102 N⋅m; 75 lbf⋅ft) at 3000 rpm. The B1500's output remained the same but for the second generation B1500 an improved engine cylinder head and valves and a downdraft carburetor increased the maximum horsepower to 72 PS (53 kW) at 5200 rpm and a maximum torque of 12.0 kg⋅m (118 N⋅m; 87 lbf⋅ft) at 3400 rpm.

UA:

- March 1960 – 1965: Mazda D1500 (DUA12)
- 1961-1965: Mazda B1500 (BUA/BUB)
- 1965-1971: Mazda B1500/Proceed (BUD61)
- 1965-1977: Mazda Kraft DUD9/DUE9

UB:

- 1962-1971: Mazda T1500

== VA ==
The VA first appeared in the Mazda D2000 of April 1962. With a bore and stroke of 82 mm × 94 mm (3.23 in × 3.70 in), displacement is 2.0 L (1,985 cc). Power output was originally 81 PS (60 kW) at 4600 rpm, but later models have 92 PS (68 kW) at 5000 rpm.

- April 1962 - 1964 Mazda D2000, D2000 Microbus (DVA12)
- 1964 - 1973 Mazda Light Bus (AEVA)
- January 1964 - 1971 Mazda E2000 (EVA12/32)
- Mazda Parkway 18 (EVK15)
- 1971 - 197? Mazda Titan (EVB12)
- 1973 - 197? Mazda Parkway 26 (AEVB)

== See also ==
- Mazda engines
- Mazda Wankel engine
