= List of Mazda engines =

Type	Family	Name	Displacement (cc)	Years
V2	V-twin	BA; EA/EB	356; 577	1958–1963
V2	V-twin	MB; HB	1105; 1400	1958–1963
I4	early OHV	DA/DB; RA; SA; TA; UA/UB; VA	358; 586; 782; 1139; 1484; 1985	1959–1967
I4	later OHV	PB; TB	987; 1169	1961–1974
I4	xC	PC; TC; UC/D4; UB/D5; NA; VB; VC; MA	985; 1272; 1415; 1490; 1586; 1796; 1769; 1970	1965–1984
I4	E	E1; E3; E5	1071; 1296; 1490	1980–1987
I4	F	FE; F2; FS; FP; RF; R2	1998; 2184; 1991; 1839; 1998; 2184	1977–2002
I4	G	G6; G5; GY	2606; 2500; 2494	1989–1999
I4	B	B1; B3; B5; B6; B8/BP	1138; 1324; 1498; 1597; 1839	1985–2005
I4	Z	Z5; ZL; ZM	1489; 1498; 1598	1995–2014
I4	MZR	ZJ; ZY; Z6; L8; LF; L3	1349; 1498; 1598; 1798; 1999; 2261	1995–
Diesel I4 (licensed Perkins)	Mazda	S2; XA; HA	2209; 2522; 2977	1970–1984
V6	J	JF; J5; JE	2000; 2500; 2954	1986–1994
V6	K	K8; KF; KJ; KL	1845; 1995; 2300; 2497	1991–2002
Wankel	Mazda	L8A; 10A; 12A/12B; 13A; 13B; 20B; 26J/26B; Renesis	798; 982; 1146; 1310; 1308; 1962; 2622; 1310	1963–

Mazda makes both piston and Wankel "rotary" engines. This page summarizes the various engine families and variations.

== Piston engines ==
Although Mazda is well known for their Wankel "rotary" engines, the company has been manufacturing piston engines since the earliest years of the Toyo Kogyo company. Early on, they produced overhead camshaft, aluminum blocks, and an innovative block containing both the engine and transmission in one unit. This section summarizes piston engine developments. Note that only Mazda's V-twin, Inline-4, and V6 configurations have made it to market. The company has engineered and completed a W12 engine by 1990 for use in their proposed Amati luxury car brand. Due to financial hardships during that time, the luxury brand was abandoned as well as those two engines.

=== V-twin ===
Like several other Japanese makers, Mazda produced V-twin engines for their three-wheeled delivery vehicles of the 1950s. These were also used in some of the tiny keicars of the 1960s. These were essentially motorcycle engines, and were largely superseded by water-cooled straight-4 engines in a few years, except for in the Mazda R360 which remained in production until 1969 especially for the handicapped.

- V-twin - 356 cc—1.4 L air-cooled V2 (1958-1969)

=== Inline-4 ===
Mazda's strength since the 1960s has been in its line of Inline-4 engines. Beginning with a tiny 358 cc kei car engine, one of the smallest ever made, Mazda continues to this day to be a leading developer of this type of engine.

- OHV engine – 358 cc–1.2 L OHV I4 (1961–1974)
- xC engine – 1.0 L–2.0 L SOHC I4 (1965–1983)
- E engine – 1.1 L–1.5 L SOHC I4 (1980–1987)
- F engine – 1.6 L–2.2 L SOHC/DOHC I4 (1977–2002)
- RF engine (including MZR-CD) – Diesel - 1983 - 2009
- G engine – 2.5 L–2.6 L I4 (1989–1999)
- B engine – 1.1 L–1.8 L SOHC/DOHC I4 (1985–2005)
- Mazda Z engine (MZR) – 1.3 L–1.6 L DOHC I4 (1995–2011)
- Mazda L engine (MZR) – 1.8 L–2.5 L DOHC I4 (2002–2011)
- Japan Kei car engine – Suzuki I4
- Diesel – 1.4 L–4.6 L I4
- YF – Ford 2.0 L I4 for Mazda Tribute
- SkyActiv-G – 1.3/1.5/2.0 L I4 (2011–present)
- SkyActiv-G – 2.5 L I4 (2013–present)
- SkyActiv-D – Twin Turbo Diesel - 2.2 L I4 (2012–present)
- SkyActiv-X – 2.0 L I4 (2019–present)

=== V6 ===
Mazda has created three families of in-house V6 engines. As of 2000, they build and use the Ford Duratec V6 design.

- J engine – 2.0 L–3.0 L 60° V6 (–1995)
- K engine – 1.8 L–2.5 L 60° V6
- Diesel V6 – 4.1 L–5.5 L ZB/ZC V6
- AJ/MZI – 2.5 L and 3.0 L V6 - The Mazda version of the Ford Duratec DOHC V6. The 3.5 L MZI is the Ford Cyclone engine.

=== Inline-6 ===
Offered since 2023 in the CX-90.

- SkyActiv-G – 3.3 L I6 (2023–present)

== Wankel engines ==
Mazda is the only producer of successful Wankel engines, positioning them as a prime sports car powerplant. All of Mazda's Wankels are based on their first design of the 1960s, though there have been significant developments over the four decades. After Mazda RX-8 production ceased in 2013, Mazda has carried on with testing prototypes to re-introduce the rotary as part of the "SkyActiv" lineup, dubbed SkyActiv R, displacing 1600 cc and featuring direct injection, laser ignition and forced induction.

- Wankel family – 1.0 L-2.0 L Wankel (1967–present)
  - 10A – 1.0 L (1967–1973)
  - 0813 – 1.0 L (1968–1972)
  - 13A – 1.3 L (1970–1972)
  - 12A – 1.1 L (1970–1985)
  - 13B – 1.3 L (1973–2002)
  - 20B – 2.0 L three-rotor (1990–1996)
  - R26B – 2.6 L four-rotor (1991 24 Hours of Le Mans winner)
  - Renesis – 1.3 L (2004–2013)
- Mazda Skyactiv-R – (Coming Soon)

== Gasoline Diesel Engine ==
- SKYACTIV-X
