= Mazda Chantez =

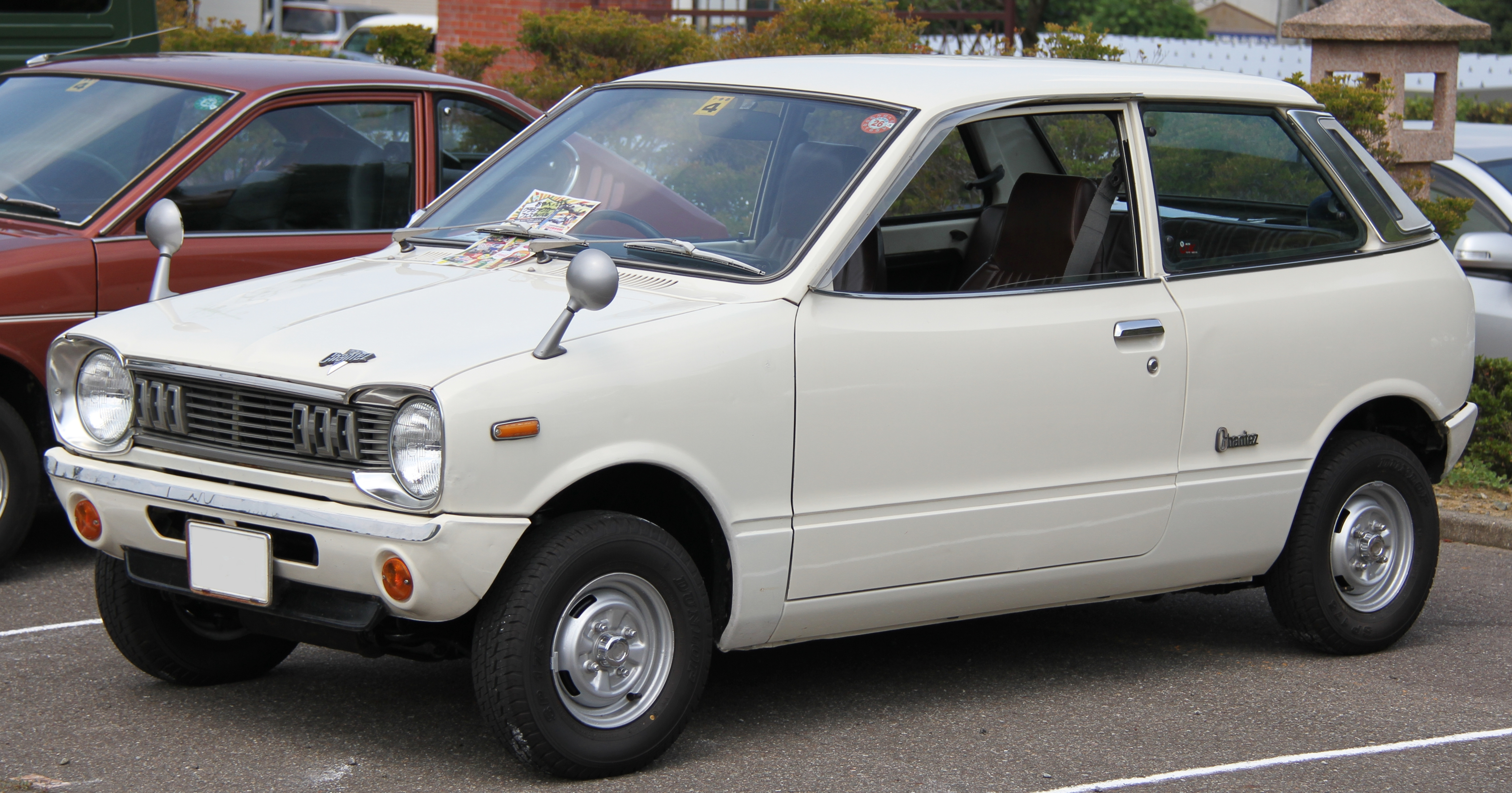
- 1974 Mazda Chantez GL

Overview
- Manufacturer: Mazda
- Production: July 1972 – April 1976
- Assembly: Japan: Hiroshima Assembly, Hiroshima

Body and chassis
- Class: Kei car
- Body style: 2-door sedan
- Layout: FR

Powertrain
- Engine: 359 cc AA I2 two-stroke

Dimensions
- Wheelbase: 2,200 mm (86.6 in)
- Length: 2,995 mm (117.9 in)
- Width: 1,295 mm (51.0 in)
- Height: 1,290 mm (50.8 in)
- Curb weight: 490 kg (1,080 lb)

Chronology
- Predecessor: Mazda Carol

The Mazda Chantez (chassis code KMAA) is a two-door kei car that was introduced by Mazda in July 1972. The Chantez had a longer wheelbase at 2,200 mm (86.6 in) than most of its competitors and featured the powerful two-stroke "AA" engine also seen in the Porter. With 35 PS (26 kW; 35 bhp), top speed was 115 km/h (71 mph) and the 400 m (0.2 mi) sprint was dispatched in a sprightly 20.6 seconds. In more recent testing (early 2000s) of a 1972 GF II, 0–100 km/h came up in 35.8 seconds. The engine was installed longitudinally in the front of the vehicle powering the rear wheels, and the spare tire was installed next to the engine on the right side.

The name chantez is second-person plural present indicative of chanter, which in French means 'to sing'.

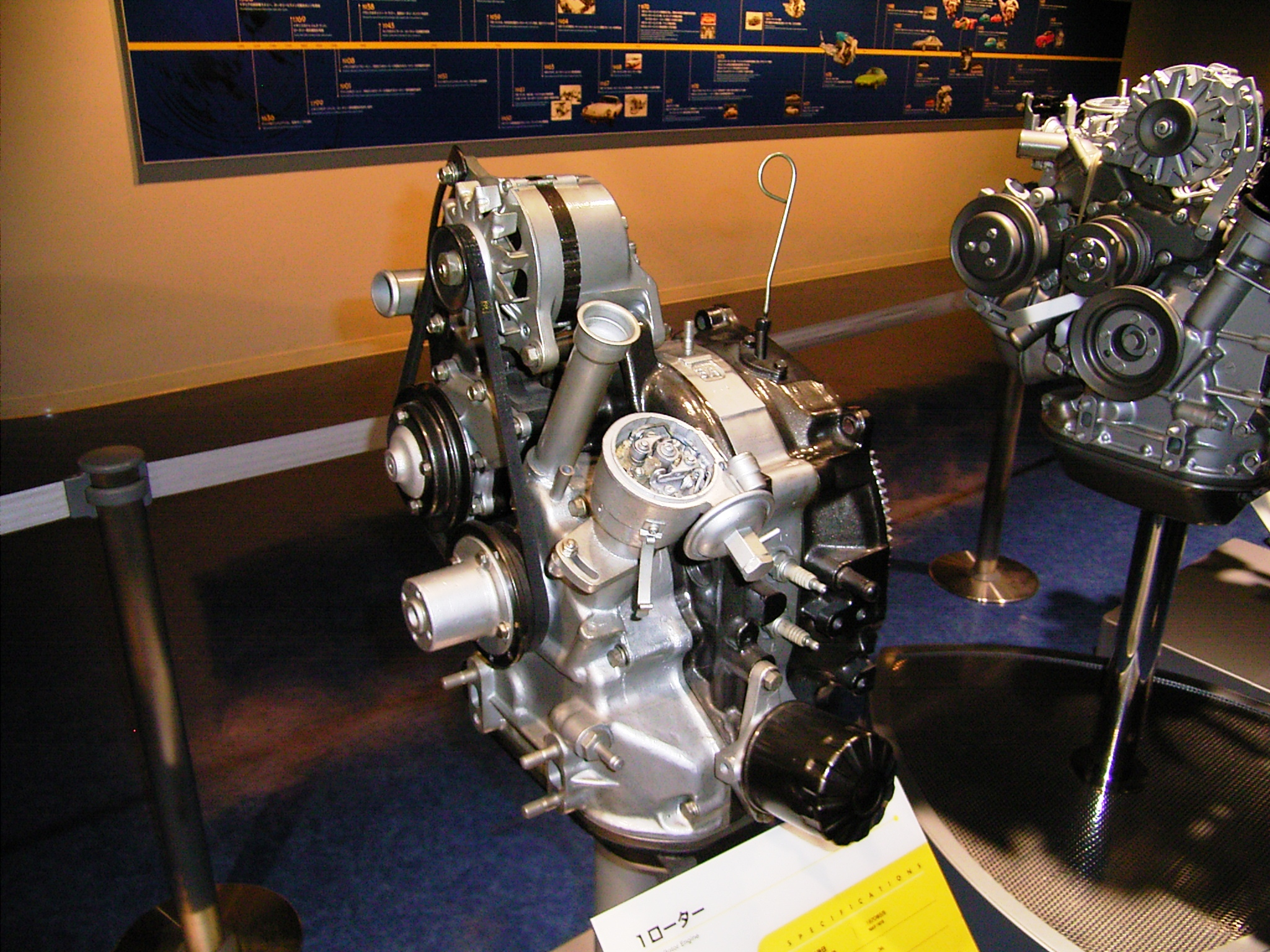
3A rotary engine, originally intended for the Chantez

Originally, the Chantez had been planned to use a single-rotor Wankel engine, a slimmed down derivative of the R100's 10A engine, and test cars were seen in 1970. Mazda's financial situation and lobbying from other Kei manufacturers, who considered this engine type an unfair advantage, to disallow rotary engines in this class meant that Mazda chose not to bring this version to market. As a result of not being able to build the car they had originally planned, Mazda lost interest in the Kei class and sales halted without a replacement in 1976, on the eve of new Kei car regulations. Mazda did not market another Kei passenger car until 1989 with a reintroduction of the Carol, which was a rebadged Suzuki Alto, and to this day still choose not to make their own engines for the Kei class.

Equipment levels ranged from the lowest spec L (less chrome, body colored bumpers and B-pillars), via the LX, GL, GF, and GL II to the top-of-the-line GF II, which featured a sports interior, radial tires, and available two-tone paint.

1972–1974 Chantez GL II

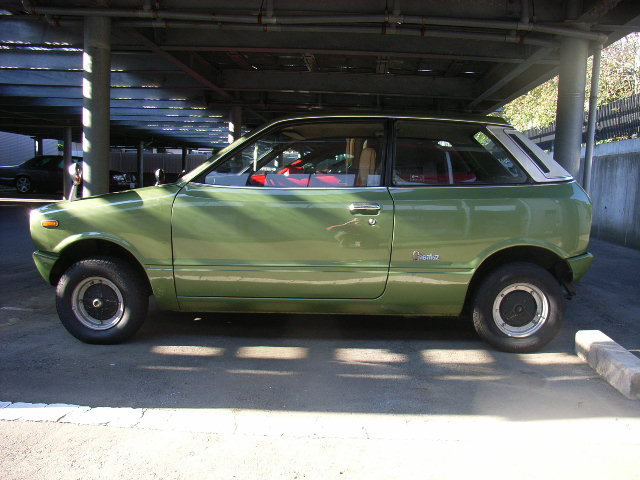
Side view

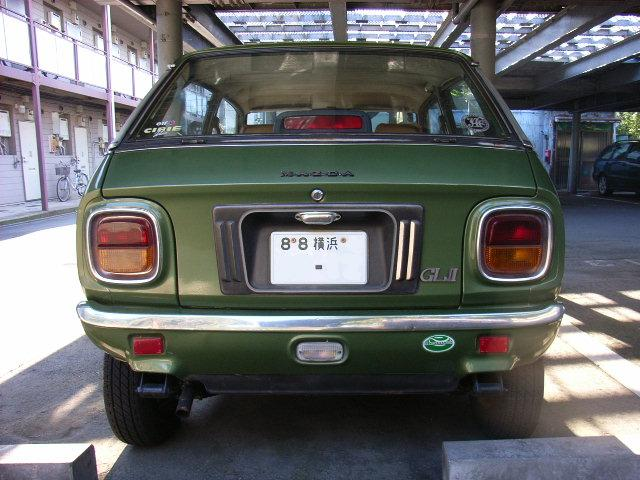
Rear view

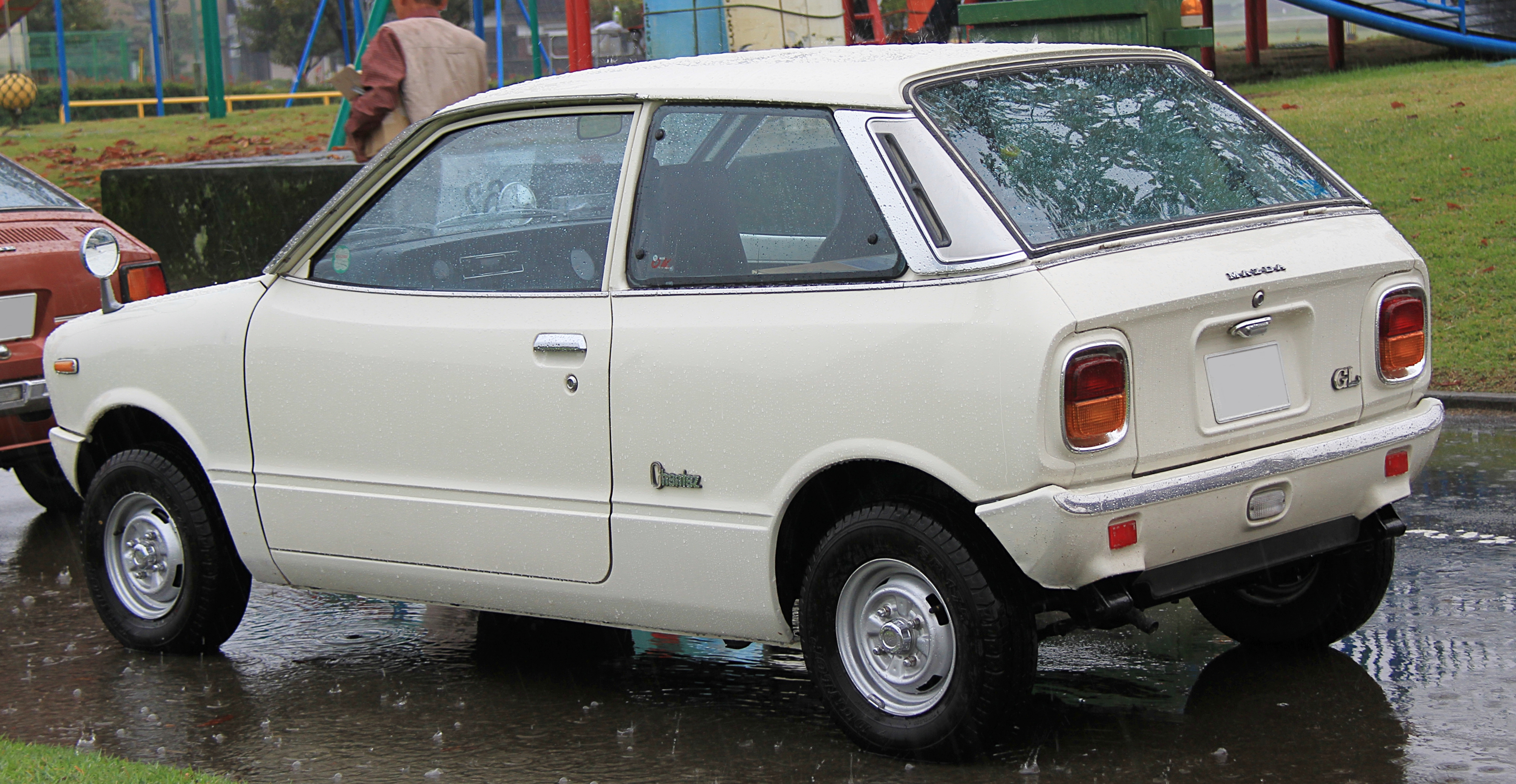
1974 Mazda Chantez GL (rear left view)

In late 1974, anticipating a changing law at the turn of the year, the trunk lid and front bumper were modified to fit larger-size license plates.

== Chantez EV Concept ==
The Mazda Chantez EV was a concept car designed by Mazda as part of the A.I.S.T. government funded scheme; it was unveiled at the 1972 Tokyo Motor Show.

The Chantez EV featured a unique grille-less appearance which helped with aerodynamic efficiency, also to aid with efficiency is Mazda's first car with regenerative braking. The Chantez EV was fitted with a single 8.0 kW (10.9 PS) electric motor, rear-mounted driving the rear axle, powered by a 9.6 kWh battery pack rated to deliver a total output of up to 8.0 kW (10.9 PS). It has a claimed top speed of 65 km/h (40 mph). The battery replaced the rear seat and provided a stated range of about 65 km (40 mi).
