= Mazda Porter =

The Mazda Porter and Porter Cab are a series of small kei trucks that were produced from 1961 to 1989 (as the B360/B600 until 1968) by Mazda, mainly for sale in the domestic Japanese market. Export versions of the Porter were labelled E360. The Porter was replaced by the Autozam Scrum, a rebadged Suzuki Carry.

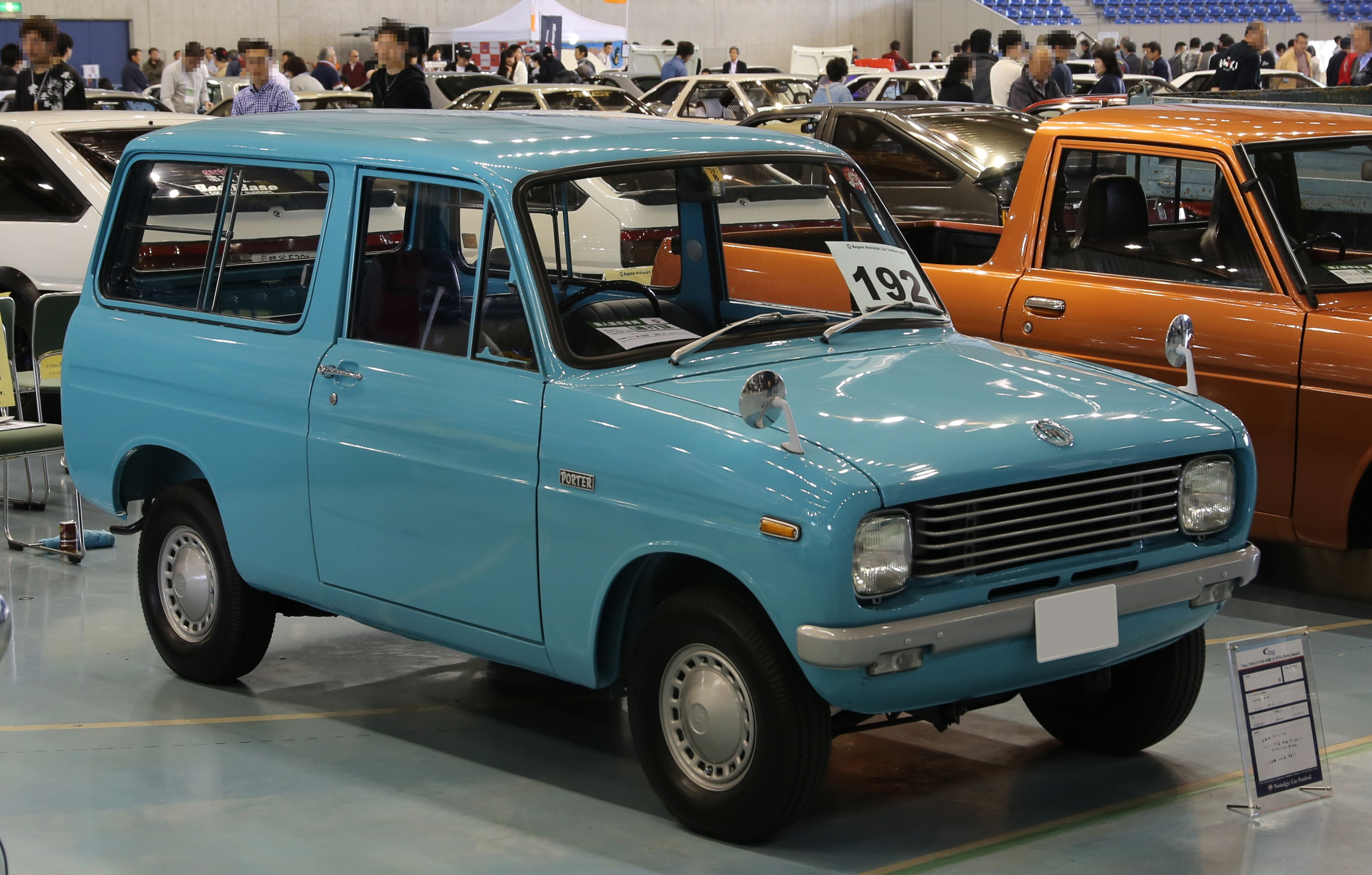
Mazda Porter Van

== B360/B600 ==
Mazda B360
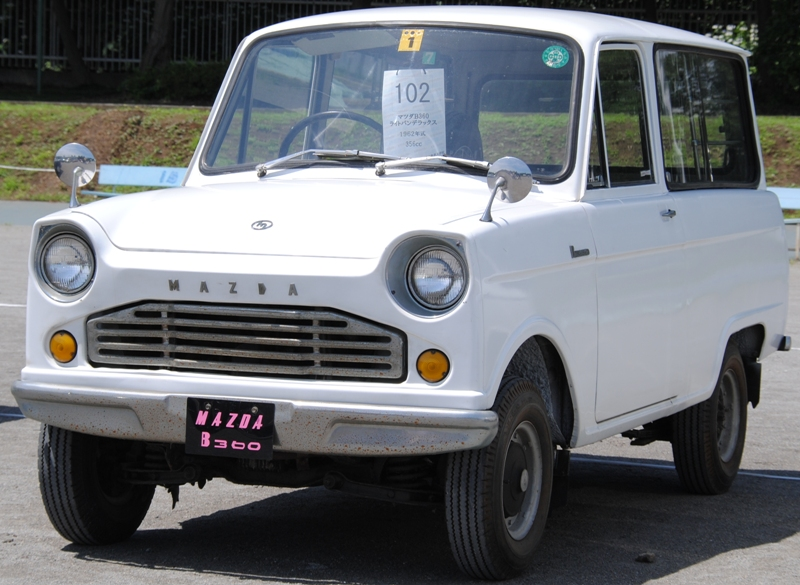
- Pre-facelift B360 (KBBAV)

Overview
- Manufacturer: Mazda
- Production: 1961—1968
- Assembly: Hiroshima Assembly, Hiroshima, Japan; Tonbo, Pandaung Township, Myanmar (MADI)

Body and chassis
- Class: MPV, van
- Body style: MPV
- Layout: FR layout

Powertrain
- Engine: 356 cc BA V-twin; 358 cc DB OHV I4; 577 cc EB V-twin
- Transmission: 4-speed manual 2-speed automatic

Chronology
- Predecessor: Mazda Mazdago
- Successor: Mazda Porter

The predecessor of the Porter, introduced in February 1961, the Mazda B360, was available as a pickup (KBBA33) or light van (KBBAV) version of the R360 kei passenger car. It had a 356 cc OHV V-twin producing 13 PS (10 kW) (BA) and weighed 535 kg (1,179 lb). The 1961 export only Mazda B600 (KBEA) was similar to the B360 except that it received an enlarged 577 cc version of the air-cooled V-twin. This engine produced 20 PS (15 kW) and 3.8 kg⋅m (37 N⋅m; 27 lb⋅ft) of torque.

In September 1963 the B360 gained the four-cylinder, 358 cc 20 PS (15 kW) DB OHV engine from the Carol. It also received a facelift, with a larger grille using the same look as the B1500 truck. The modelcodes changed to KBDA33/KBDAV, and a DeLuxe Van version was added. Top speed went up from 67 to 79 km/h (49 mph). In October 1966 the B360 received another facelift, giving it a much more modern look.

The two-cylinder B600 was one of the first Japanese cars to have an impact in the Indonesian market. The B600, nicknamed "Soap Box" (Kotak Sabun) in Indonesia for its square shape, was used by numerous government agencies and public utilities. It was only ever sold with van bodywork there. The B600 was a common sight in Indonesia for decades, so common that its V-twin engine has become popular for use in custom motorcycles. Since 2010, the supply of B600 engines has begun to dry up, however, with prices increasing accordingly.

In 1972, the B360/600 entered license production in Burma (today's Myanmar). Mazda's investment consisted of shipping the production equipment to Burma; this was part of Japanese war reparations to Myanmar. After strict sanctions were imposed in 1988 and the import of Japanese parts became impossible, manufacture shifted to MADI (Myanmar Automobile and Diesel Engine Industries). The little trucks were built in the "No 2 Automobile Industry" plant in the small town of Tonbo, at Kwinhla Station, Pandaung Township, Bago Division (just north of Yangon), where MADI also assembled the Mazda Pathfinder and the Hino TE truck. The truck was kept in production until the mid-1990s with 100 percent local content. Always painted in blue from the factory, these were ubiquitous as taxis in Burma (Mandalay in particular) until after the markets opened up in 2011.

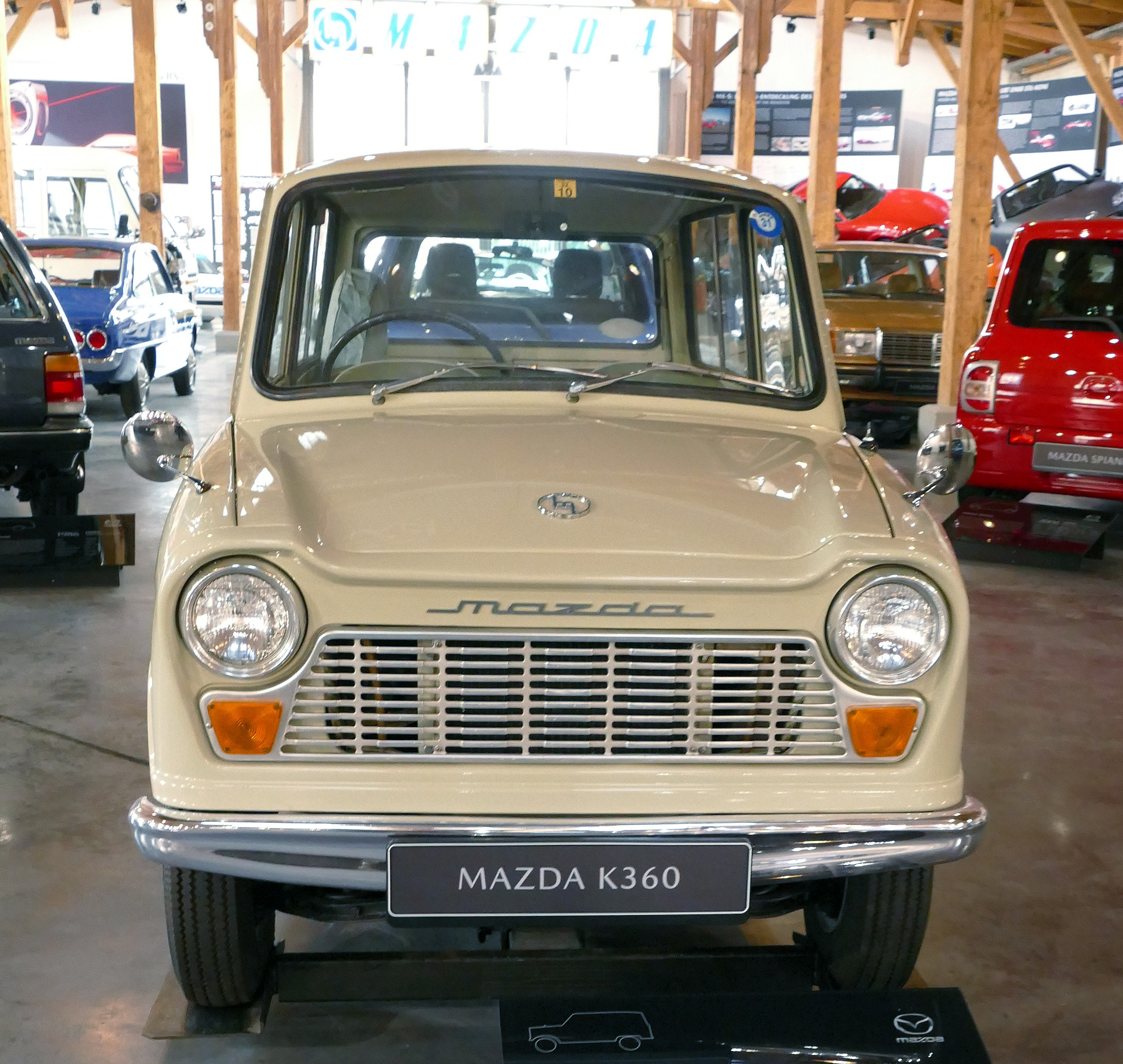
1963-1966 Mazda B360 Van (KBDAV; first facelift model)

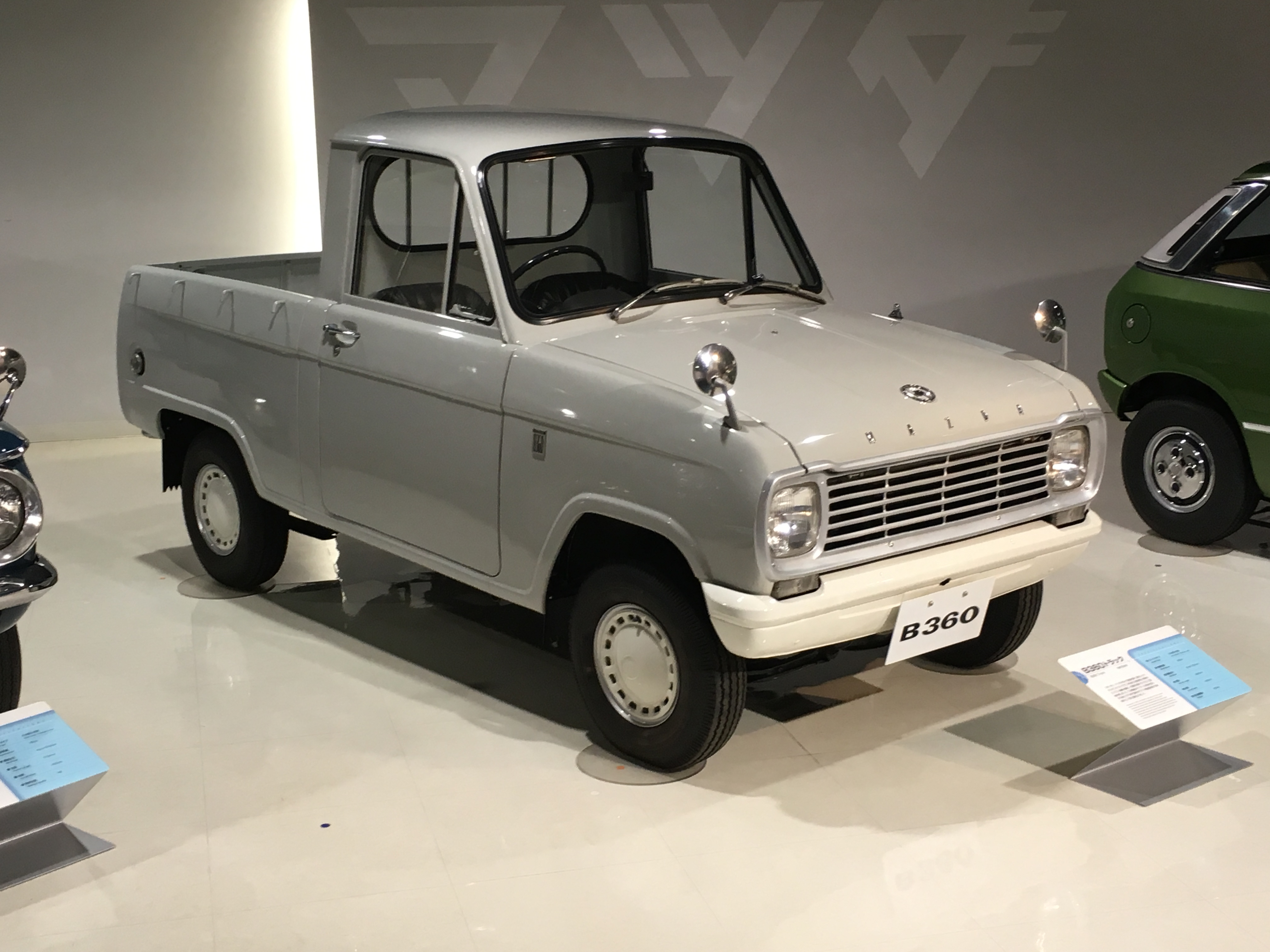
1966-1968 Mazda B360 truck (KBDA33; second facelift)

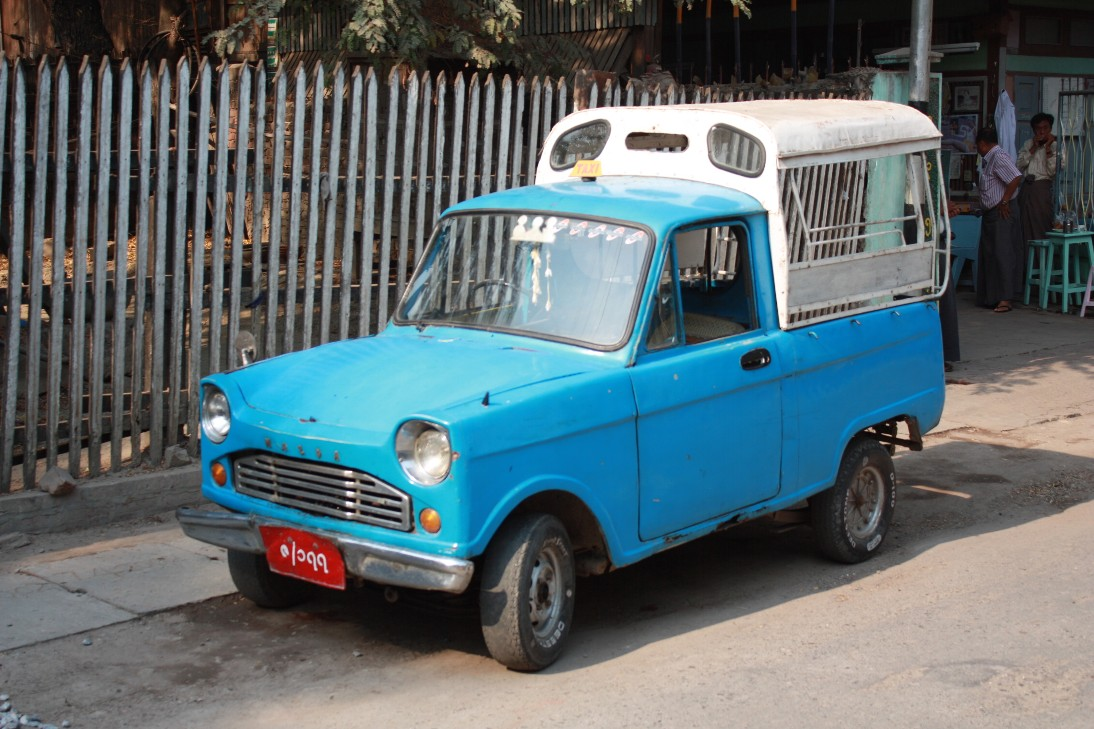
Locally manufactured B360 taxi of Myanmar in the typical blue colour.

== Porter ==
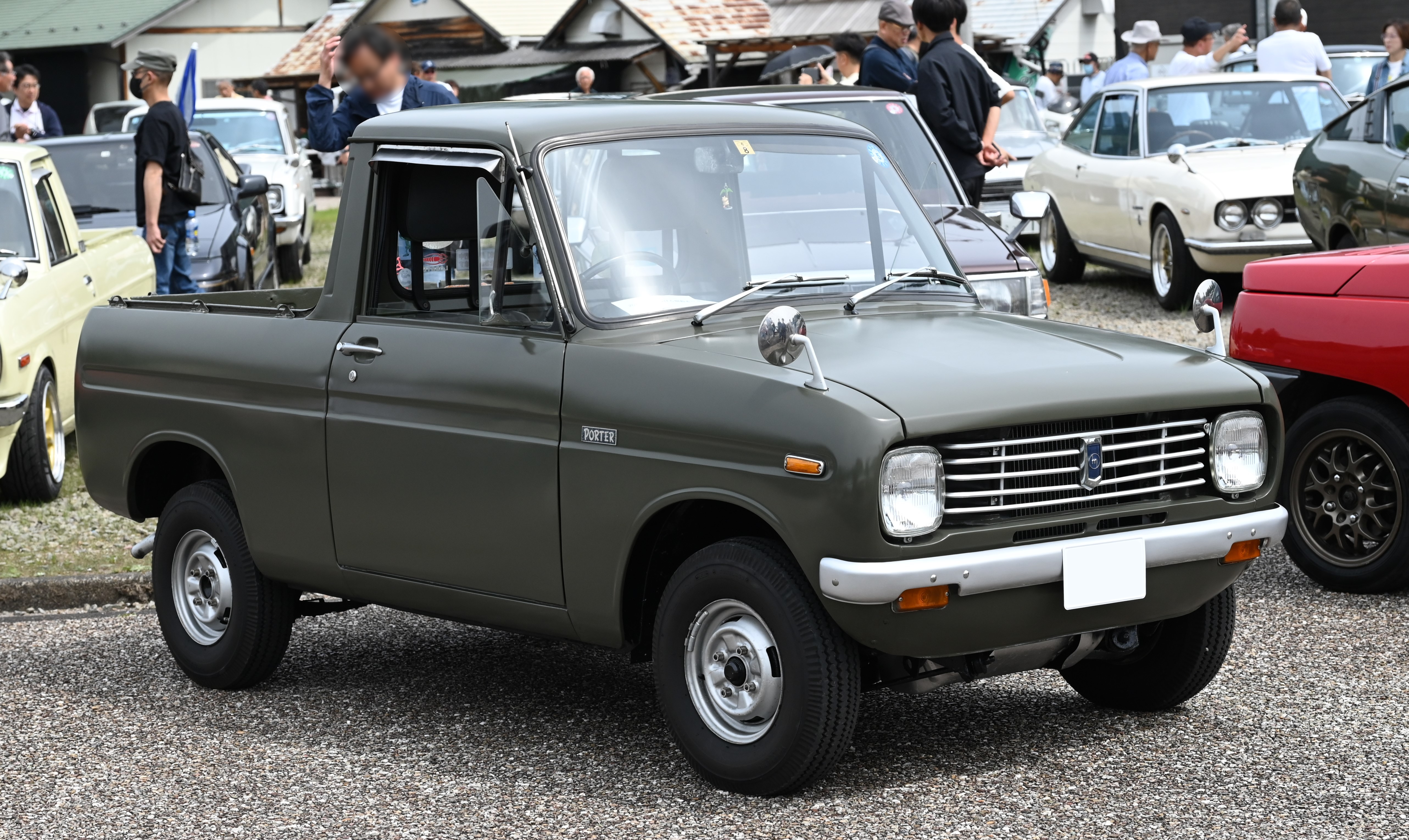

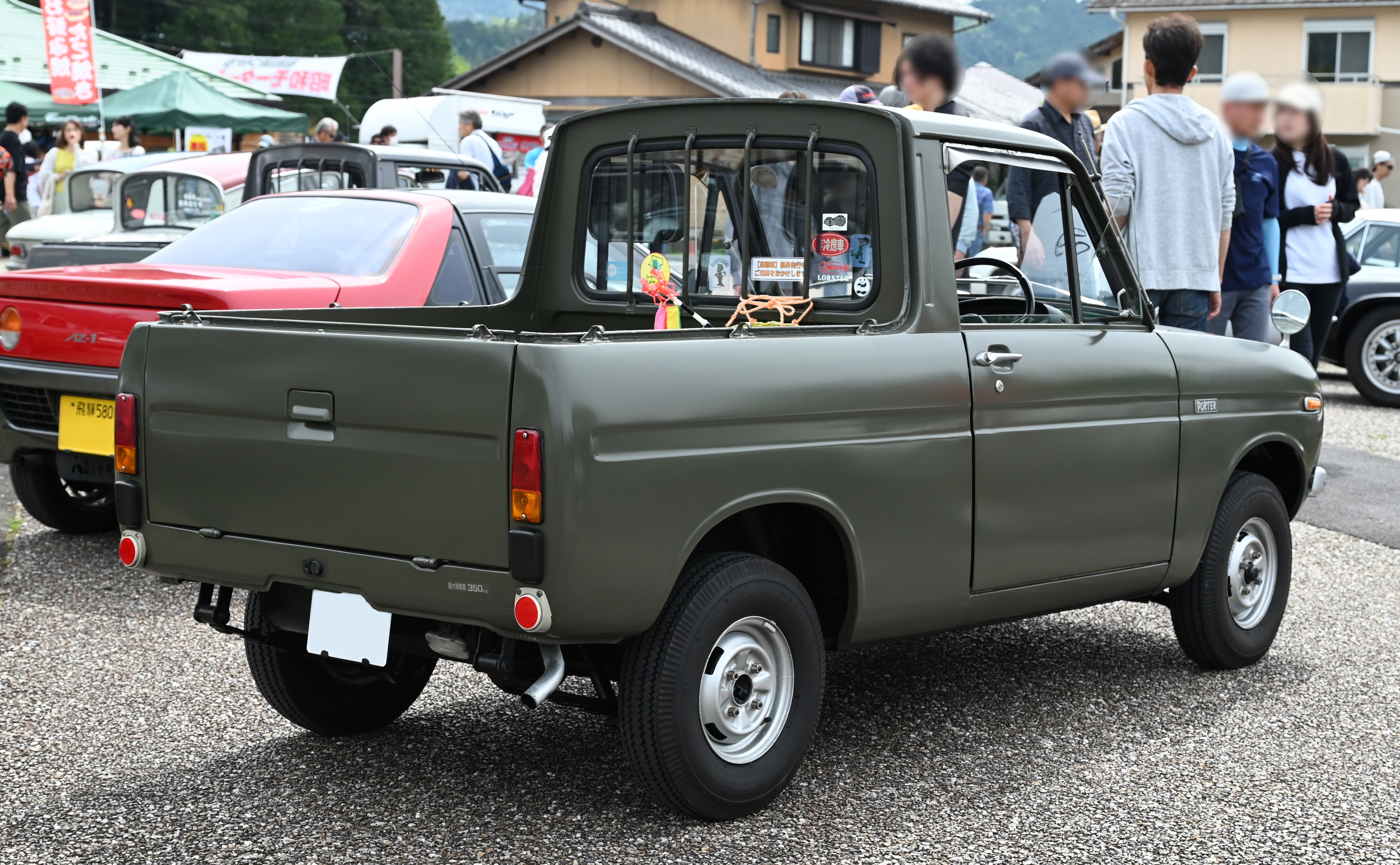
Mazda Porter Truck (KBDB33)

Available either as a pickup truck (KBDB33) or a small van (KBDBV), the first Porter (E360 in export markets) was produced from November 1968 to April 1976. The car was closely based on the B360 predecessor, but with all-new body panels. This model was briefly assembled in South Africa by Motor Assemblies: 942 examples of the E360 were built there in 1969 and 1970.

The initial engine was the carry-over four-stroke, 20 PS (15 kW) and 2.4 kg⋅m (23.5 N⋅m; 17.4 lb⋅ft) 358 cc inline-four from the B360. The engine was changed to the new Chantez' 35 PS (26 kW), 359 cc water-cooled, two-stroke two-cylinder unit in April 1973,. This change brought with it some cosmetic changes and a new model code (KBAA/KBAAV). In 1975 the Porter was modified to fit new, larger license plates and the engine downgraded to 32 PS (24 kW) to match new, stricter emissions regulations. The pickup was typically painted Pale Canary Yellow from the factory, while vans were Light Green.

The wheelbase was 1,995 mm (78.5 in) with leaf springs in the rear, weight was 475 kg (1,047 lb) and maximum cargo capacity was 300 kg (661 lb) when first introduced.

== Porter Cab ==
=== 360cc era ===
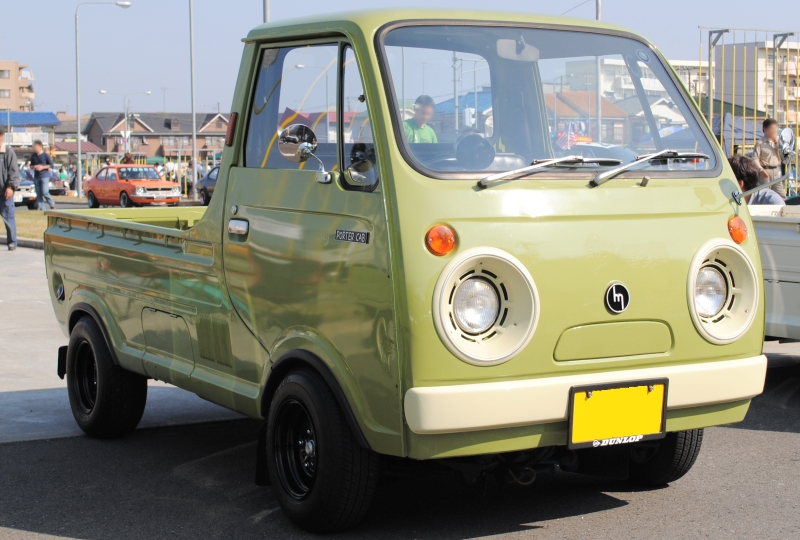
1970-73 Porter Cab

The Porter Cab (KECA53) was introduced in March 1969. It was a small, cabover pickup truck on a 1,835 mm (72.2 in) wheelbase, equipped with a live rear axle and a 23 PS (17 kW) at 5500 rpm, 359 cc water-cooled, two-stroke two-cylinder. This, the CC, was Mazda's first two-stroke engine. Top speed was 90 km/h (56 mph). The Porter Cab, with its peculiar cowlings around the headlights carried an instantly recognizable "surprised" appearance.

In 1970 new doors were developed, with the original sliding windows exchanged for roll-down items, incorporating a quarter window. A ventilation vent was also added to the front. Like the Porter, the Porter Cab received the Chantez-derived AA engine in April 1973, which offered 30 PS (22 kW) at 6000 rpm, five less than in the Chantez.

In January 1975, the Porter Cab too was lightly modified to fit the new larger license plates - hitherto, kei cars had carried smaller license plates than regular cars; 230 mm × 125 mm (9.1 in × 4.9 in) rather than 330 mm × 165 mm (13.0 in × 6.5 in). In April 1976 the Porter Cab also received an engine which met the new, tougher 1975 emissions regulations and the model code PC3A. The only color available was changed too, from light green to white. Like the Porter before it, the Porter Cab was labelled E360 in export markets.

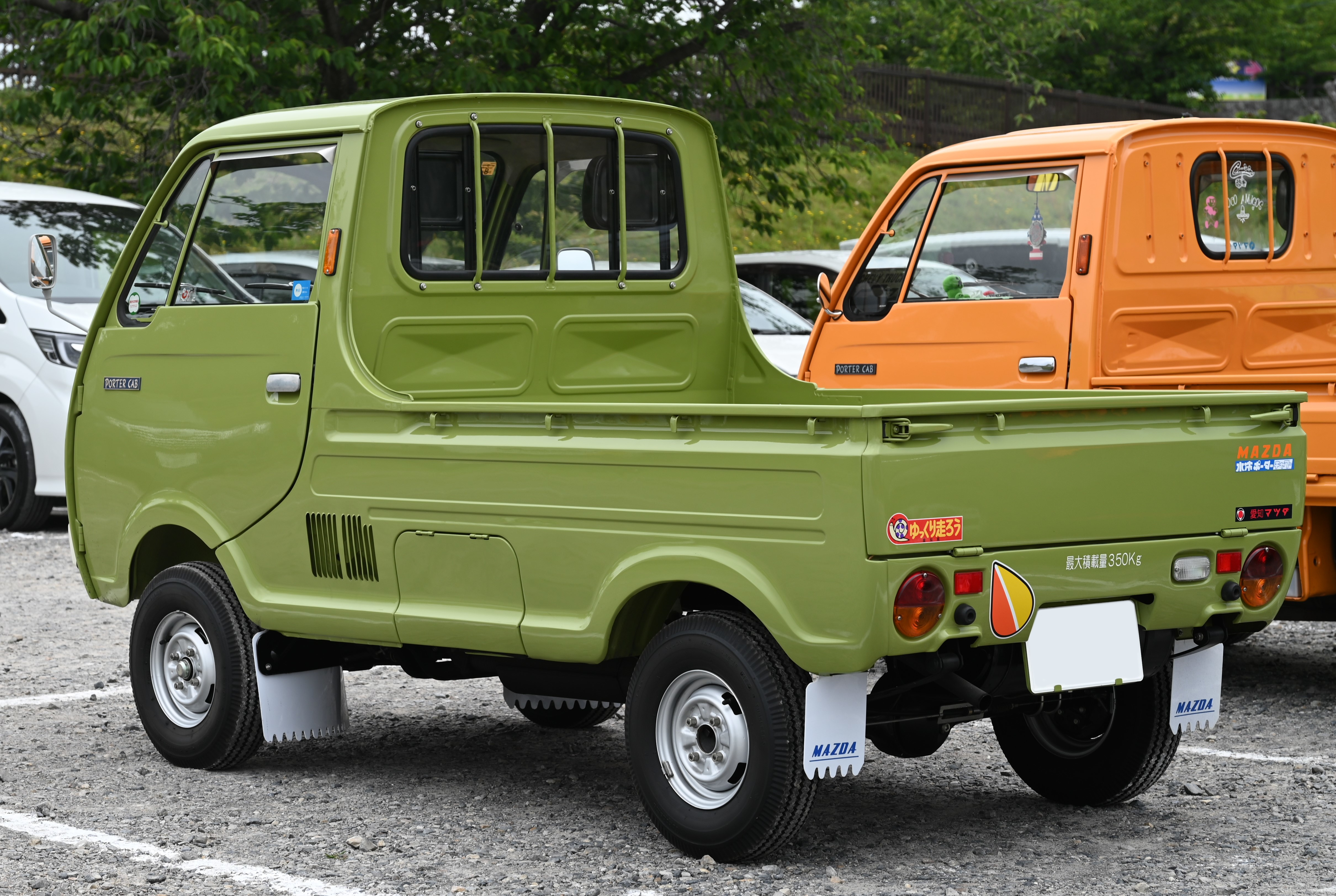
Rear view

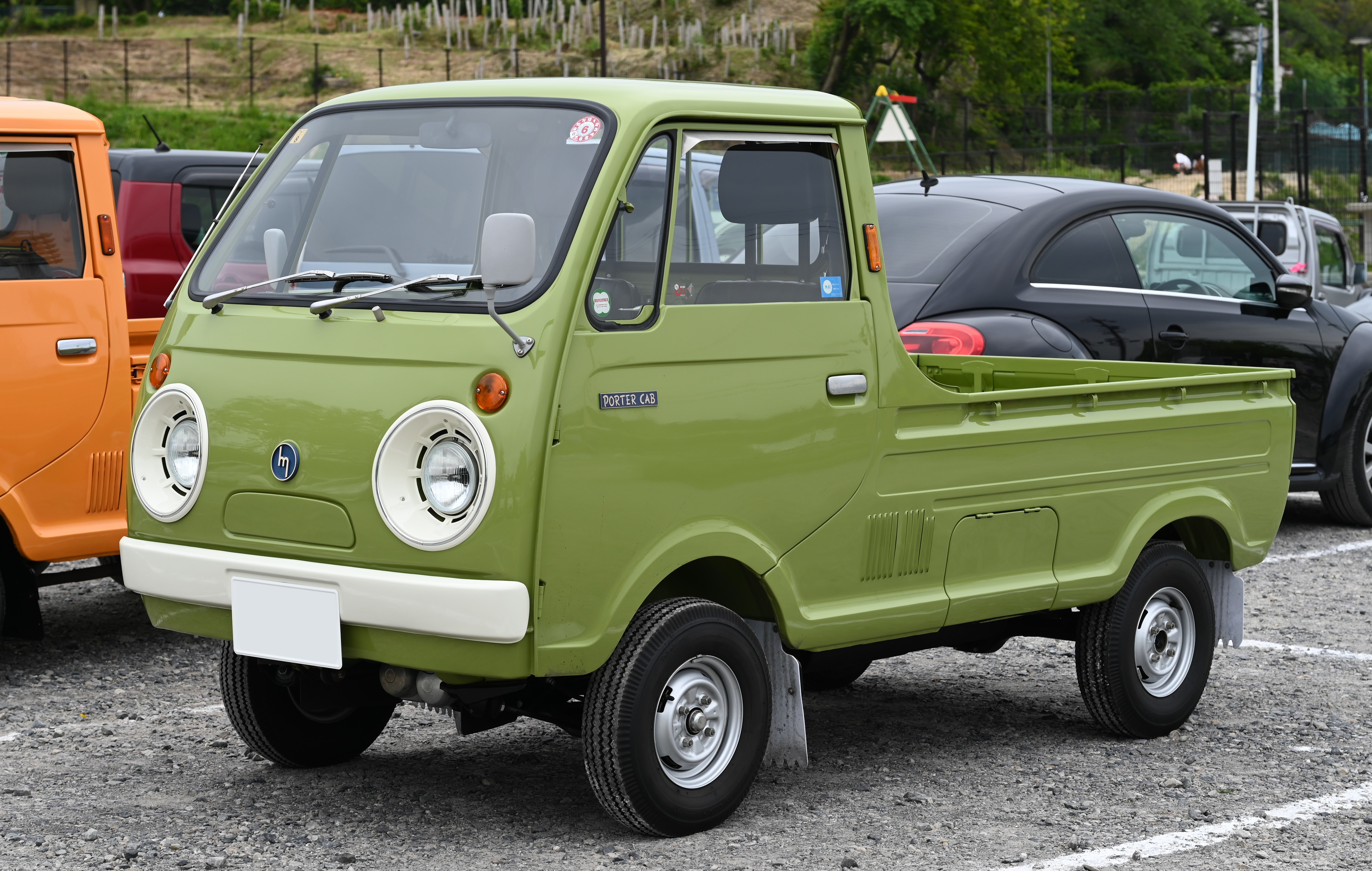
1973-1977 Porter 360 cab

Prices

Porter Cab Standard	¥308,000	introduced March, 1969
Porter Cab DeLuxe	¥335,000	introduced July, 1969

=== 550cc era ===
Mazda Porter Cab (PC4D)
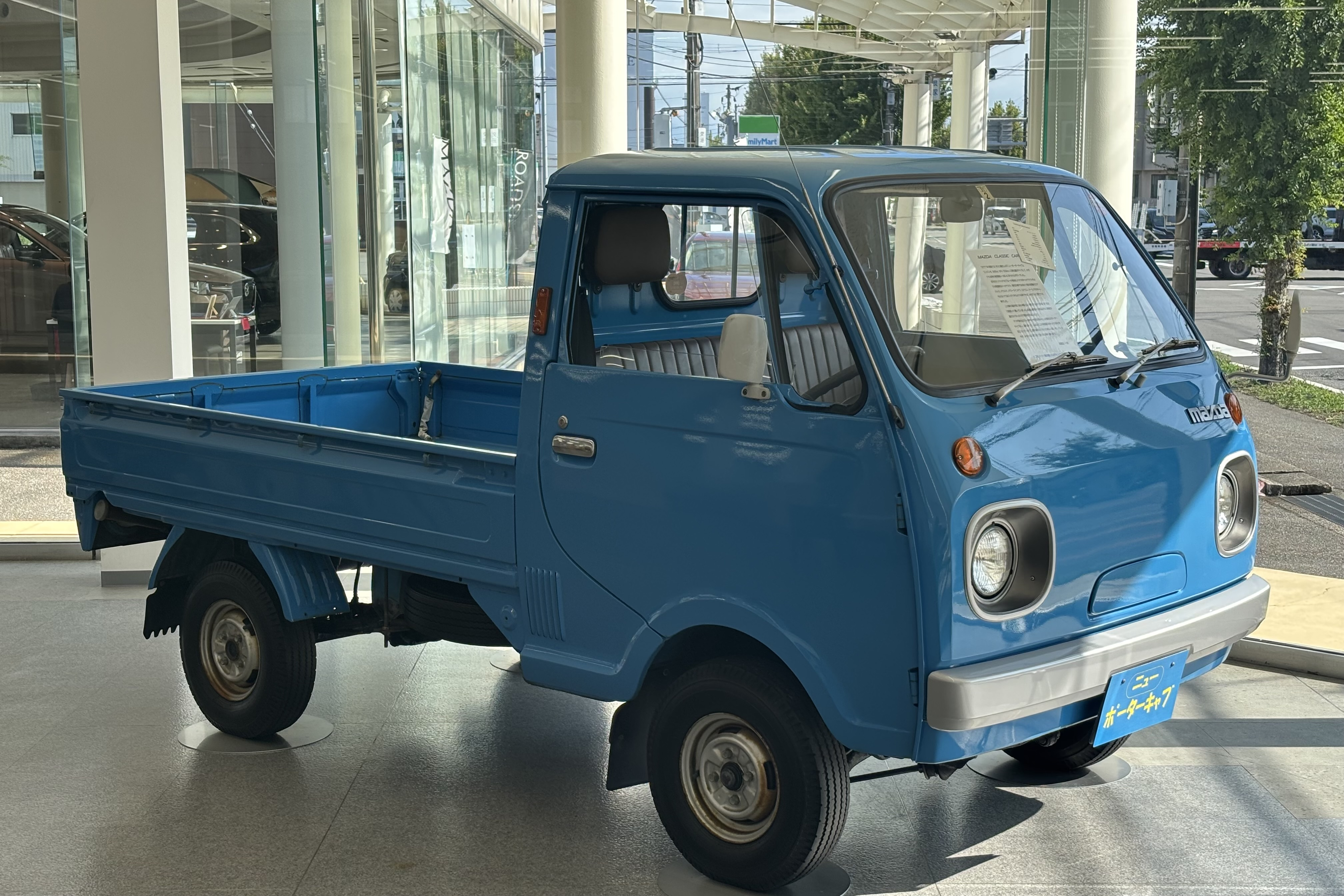

Overview
- Manufacturer: Mazda
- Production: 1977–1989

Body and chassis
- Class: Kei car
- Body style: pickup truck
- Layout: FR layout

Powertrain
- Engine: 546 cc Mitsubishi 2G23/G23B I2

Chronology
- Successor: Autozam Scrum

When Kei car regulations were changed for 1976, due to shrinking sales in the category, Mazda did not think it a worthwhile expenditure to develop a new, clean 550 cc engine. Instead, they discontinued the Chantez passenger car and the Porter pickup, and began buying Mitsubishi's 2G23 engines to equip the New Porter Cab which appeared in 1977 (PC4D). The Porter Cab was stretched by 200 mm (almost entirely behind the rear axle, with the 1,835 mm (72.2 in) wheelbase remaining unchanged) and widened by 100 mm (3.9 in). Dimensions were now 3,195 mm (125.8 in) x 1,395 mm (54.9 in) as per the updated standards, and the 546 cc Vulcan S two-cylinder developed 29 PS (21 kW) at 5500 rpm. The headlight bezels were squared off, lending the car a more conventional appearance. In 1979 the car gained two more horsepower.

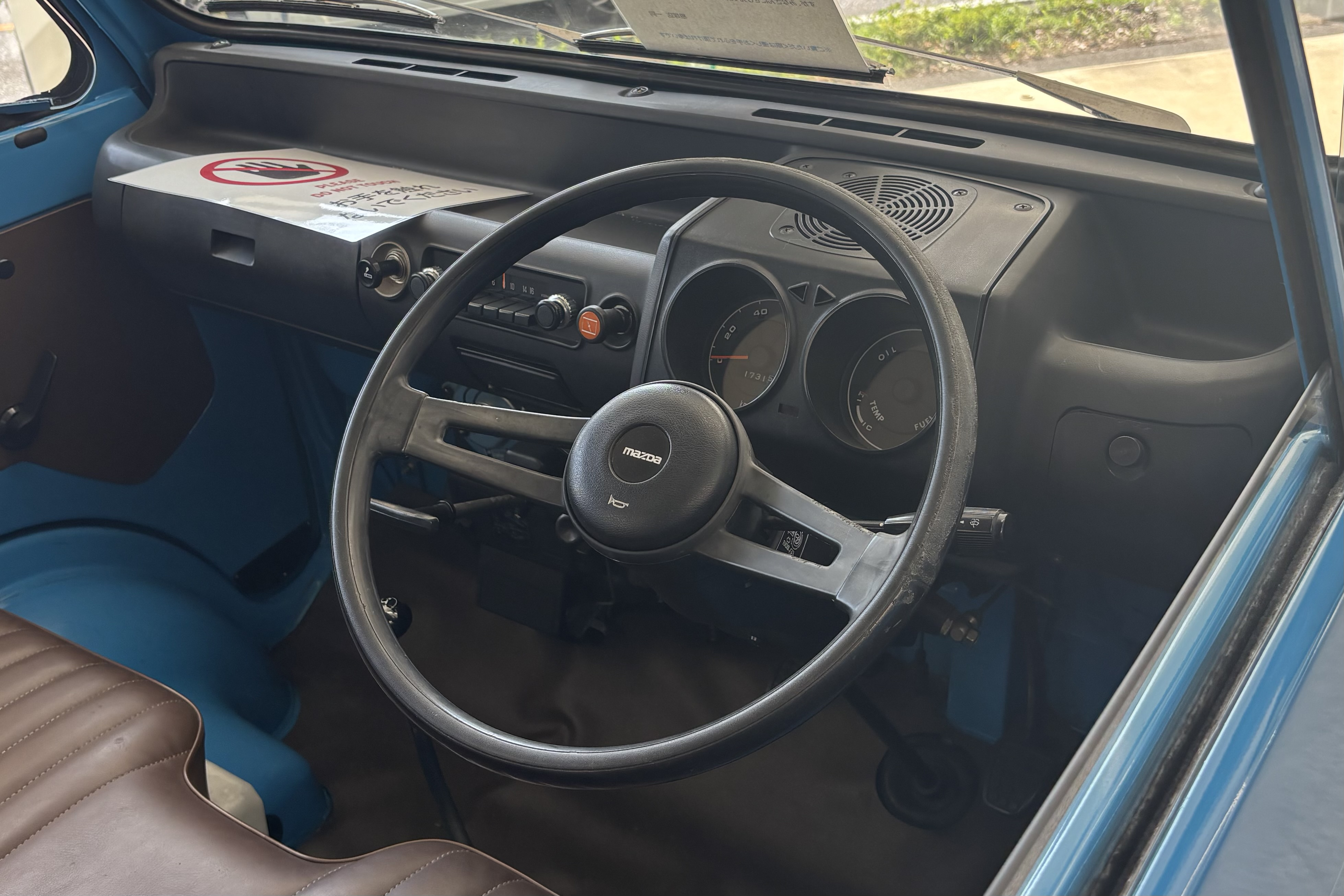
Interior

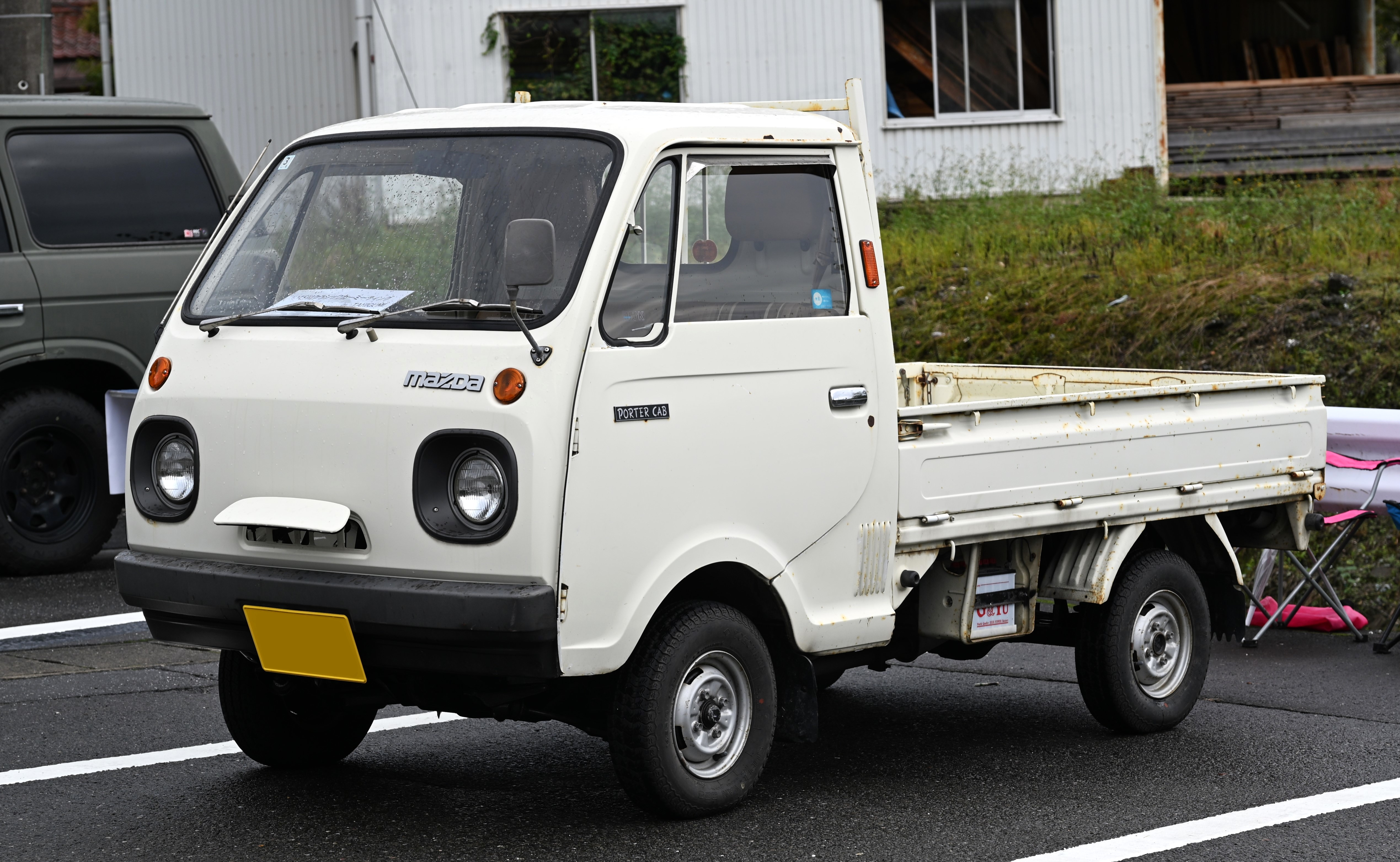
1983 facelift

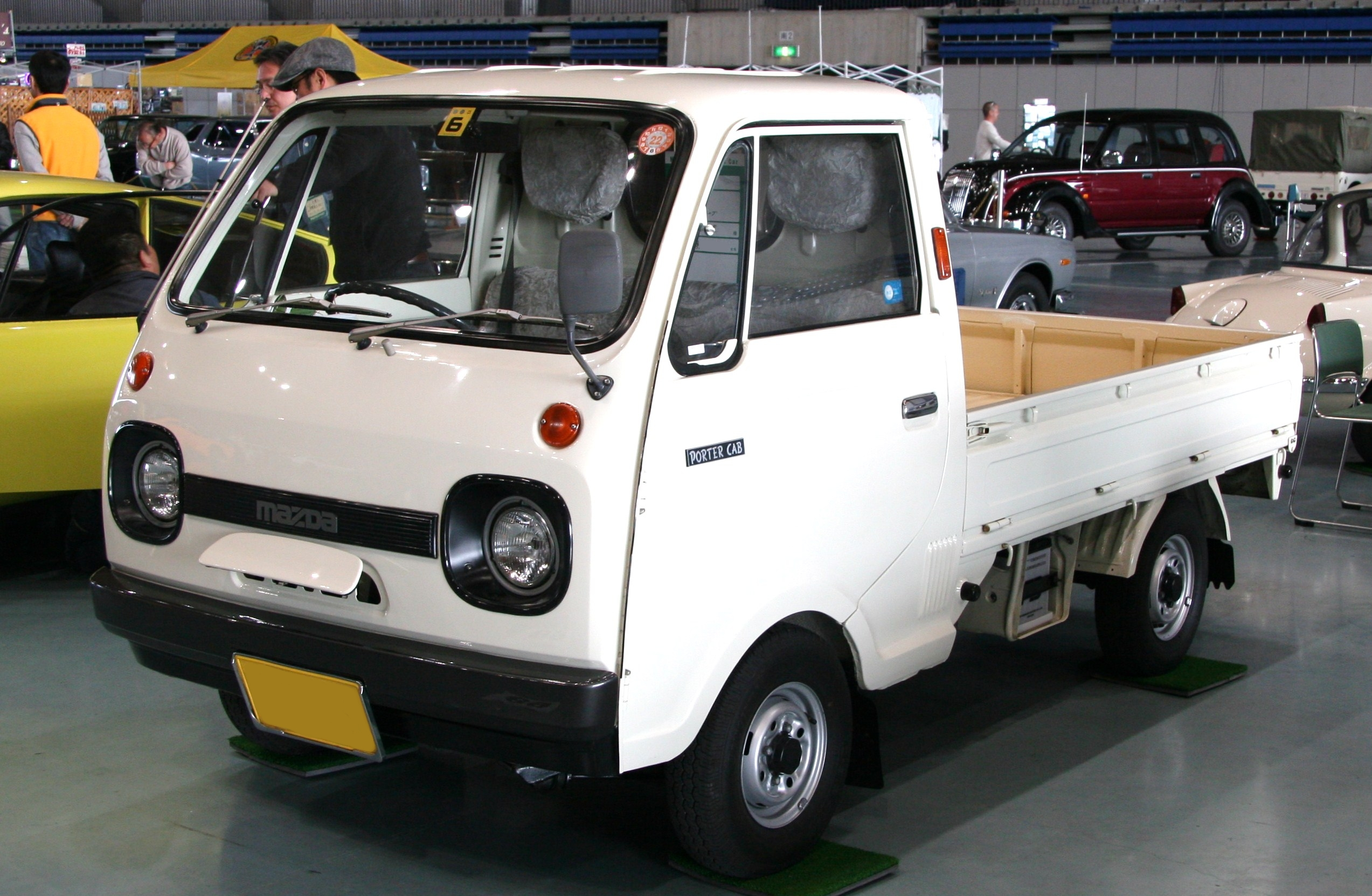
1985 facelift

The second generation Porter Cab was only available in a bright blue color with light grey trim (bumpers, headlight bezels) and black interior, until the 1983 facelift after which only white was available. The facelifted version gained the cleaner Vulcan II engine (G23B), although power output remained the same. Trim pieces were now in a darker grey, interior brown.

In 1985 there was another minor facelift, with trim pieces now in black and a black band between the headlights. The engine switched from a timing chain to a timing belt, and the interior changed to gray. Air conditioning was now available as an option. In 1987 the Mitsubishi Minicab received Mitsubishi's new three-cylinder engine, but the Porter Cab had to soldier on with the old two-cylinder. In June 1989, after twenty years of continuous production with nothing more than facelifts, the Porter Cab was finally retired. It was replaced by the Autozam Scrum, a badge-engineered Suzuki Carry.
