= Mazda V-twin engine =

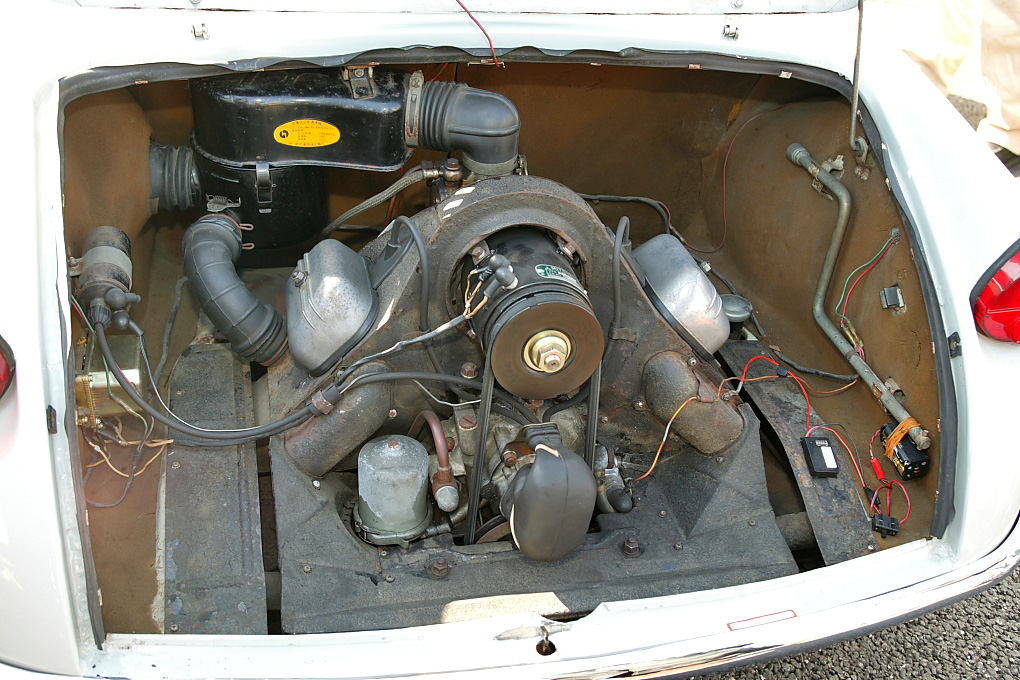
V-twin engine in Mazda R360 engine compartment

The Mazda V-twin engine was an air-cooled V-twin engine produced by Mazda in the early 1960s. This was Mazda's first automobile engine, before a more common inline-four engine configuration was introduced.

== BA (356 cc) ==
The first automobile engine from Mazda was the 356 cc air-cooled 90° V-twin. It was an OHV 4-valve pushrod design. This engine produced 16 PS (12 kW) and 16 lb⋅ft (22 N⋅m) in the 1960 Mazda R360.

== EB (577 cc) ==
The engine was enlarged to 577 cc for the 1961 B600, which was built until 1966. It produces 20 PS (15 kW) at 4300 rpm and 3.8 kg⋅m (37 N⋅m; 27 lb⋅ft) of torque at 3000 rpm. This engine is popular with custom motorcycle builders in Indonesia, who use it in a variety of frames to emulate the V-twin engined Harley-Davidsons.

== See also ==
- List of Mazda engines
