= Hiroshima (Mazda factory) =

Automobile manufacturing complex in Hiroshima, Japan

Coordinates: 34°22′40.36″N 132°30′13.99″E

The Hiroshima Plant is an automobile manufacturing complex in Aki, Minami, Hiroshima, Japan, operated by Mazda Motor Corporation. The complex consists of two main elements, the head office in Aki District, and the main plant in nearby Ujina District. It was Mazda's only car-assembly plant in Japan until the Hofu Plant opened in 1982. Mazda's own museum is situated within the plant, showcasing some of Mazda's historic cars and their present and future models.

== Head office ==
The head office opened March 1931 and continues to serve as a site for piston engine and transmission production. The facility is 55.1 hectares (136 acres) in size.

== Plant complex ==
The plant complex includes Plants I and II (officially "U1" and "U2" for their Ujina location). The total complex (including the head office and a nearby port) is 1.69 square kilometres (0.65 sq mi) in size.

Ujina 1 opened in November 1966.

Ujina 2's engine plant opened in December 1964, with the current automobile assembly plant opening in December 1972.

== Current vehicles ==
=== Ujina 1 ===
- Mazda Roadster/MX-5/Miata (1989–present)
- Mazda CX-5 (2012–present)
- Mazda CX-3 (2016–present)
- Mazda CX-30 (2019–present)

=== Ujina 2 ===
- Mazda CX-5 (2012–present)
- Mazda CX-8 (2017–present)

== Past vehicles ==
- Mazdago (1931)
- Mazda K360 (1959–1969)
- Mazda R360 (1960–1966)
- Mazda Porter (1961–1968)
- Mazda B-Series (1961–2006)
- Mazda Carol/P360 (1962–1964)
- Mazda Familia/GLC/323 (1963–1982)
- Mazda Luce/929 (1966–1990)
- Mazda Bongo/E-Series (1966–2018)
- Mazda Capella/626/Montrose (1970–1982)
- Mazda Titan (1971–2000)
- Mazda Parkway (1972-1997)
- Mazda Chantez (1972–1976)
- Mazda RX-7 (1978–2002)
- Mazda MPV/Mazda8 (1989–2016)
- Mazda Sentia/929 (1991–1998)
- Mazda Demio/Mazda2 (1996–2014)
- Mazda Premacy/Mazda5 (1999–2017)
- Mazda RX-8 (2003–2012)
- Mazda CX-7 (2006–2012)
- Mazda Biante (2008–2017)
- Fiat/Abarth 124 Spider (2016–2020)
- Mazda CX-9 (export) (2006–2024)
