= Mazda R360 =

Mazda R360 Coupé
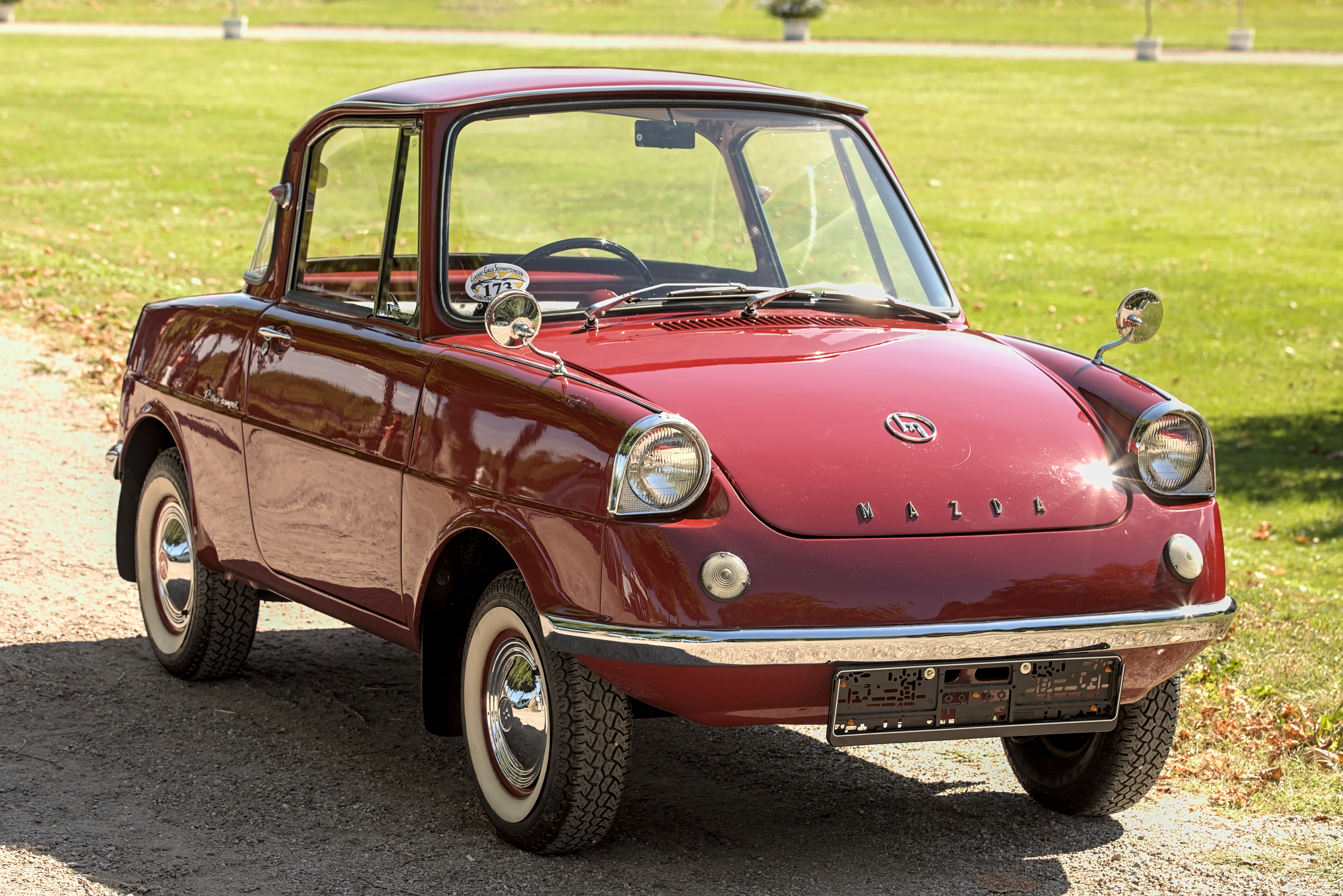

Overview
- Manufacturer: Mazda
- Production: 1960–1969
- Assembly: Hiroshima Assembly, Hiroshima, Japan

Body and chassis
- Class: Kei car
- Body style: 2-door coupé
- Layout: RR layout

Powertrain
- Engine: 356 cc V-twin
- Transmission: 4-speed manual 2-speed automatic

Dimensions
- Wheelbase: 1,760 mm (69.3 in)
- Length: 2,980 mm (117.3 in)
- Width: 1,290 mm (50.8 in)
- Height: 1,290 mm (50.8 in)
- Curb weight: 380 kg (838 lb)

Chronology
- Successor: Mazda Carol

The Mazda R360 is a kei car manufactured and marketed by Mazda from May 1960 to 1969. It was the first passenger car produced by the company. The R360 is a two-door coupé with a 2+2 seating arrangement. It has a rear-engine, rear-wheel-drive layout and was designed to be inexpensive and light weight.

== History ==
The R360 was built with the goal of being extremely light weight, as well as low cost. To achieve the weight goal, it was a 2+2 design, with a rear seat not suitable for adults, while the engine was made from aluminium and the chassis also used aluminium and even magnesium alloys. The weight was kept low, only 380 kg (838 lb). The use of acrylics rather than glass for the curved rear windshield and the sliding side glass further reduced weight and cost.

The R360 was an immediate success, thanks to its low price, but sales soon dropped. The four-seat Subaru 360 captured much of the lightweight (kei car) market, which led Mazda to augment the R360 by the four-seater Mazda Carol (P360) two-door sedan in 1962. The R360 sold 23,417 examples in its first year, with total cumulative production amounting to 65,737 examples. Full production of the R360 lasted for six years (until 1966), but the automatic version remained available to disabled drivers as a special order until 1969.

== Specification ==
The R360 featured a 1,760 mm (69.3 in) wheelbase, weighed 380 kg (838 lb) and was powered by a rear-mounted air-cooled 356 cc V-twin engine producing 16 PS (12 kW) and 2.2 kg⋅m (21.6 N⋅m; 15.9 lb⋅ft) of torque. The car was capable of 84 km/h (52 mph) and featured a 4-speed manual or two-speed automatic transmission. The suspension, front and rear, was rubber "springs" and torsion bars. There were two variants of the Mazda R360, officially known as KRBB and KRBC. The KRBB came with a 4-speed manual transmission, whereas the KRBC was equipped with a 2-speed "TORQ DRIVE" automatic transmission.

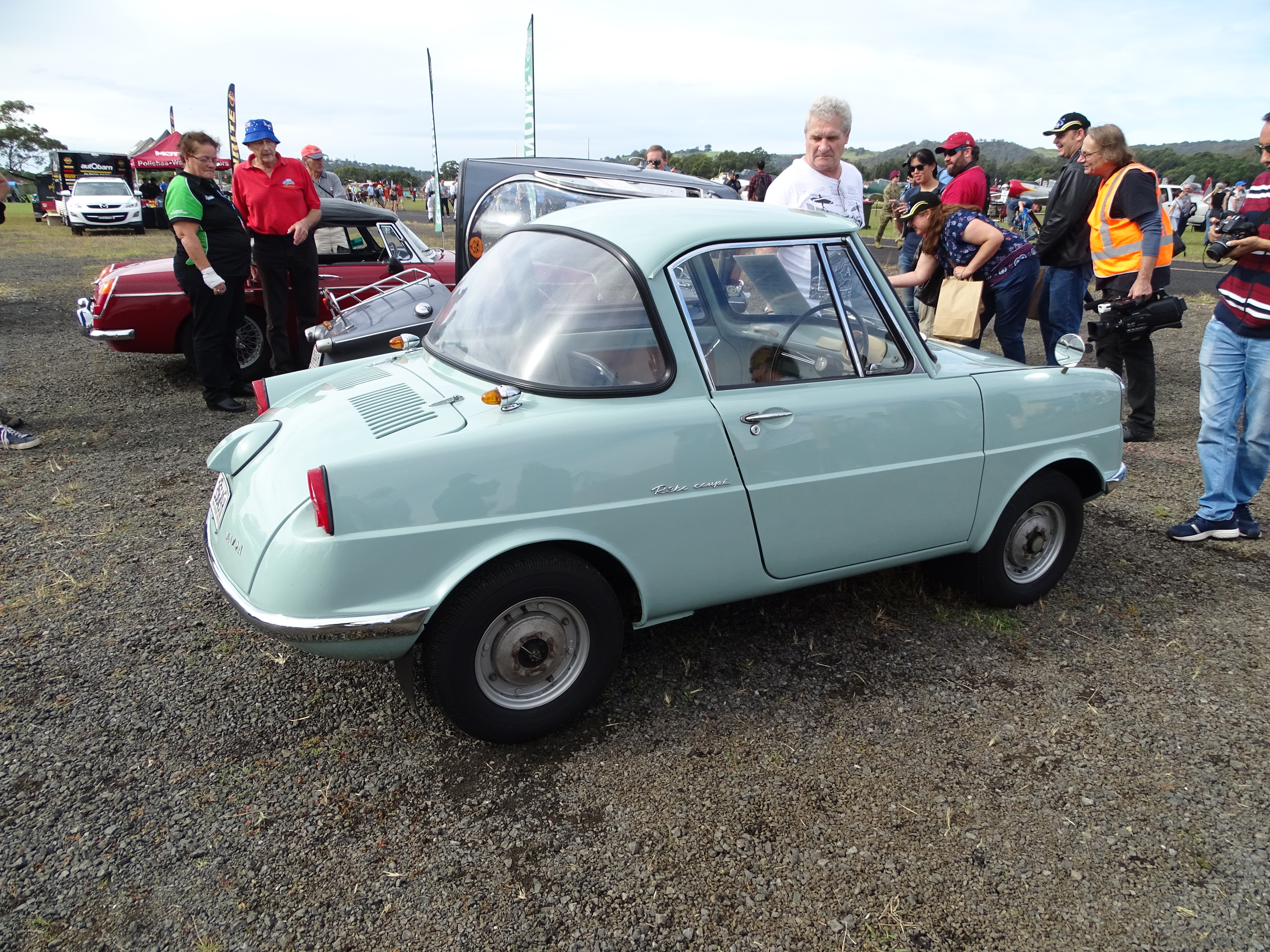
Rear view

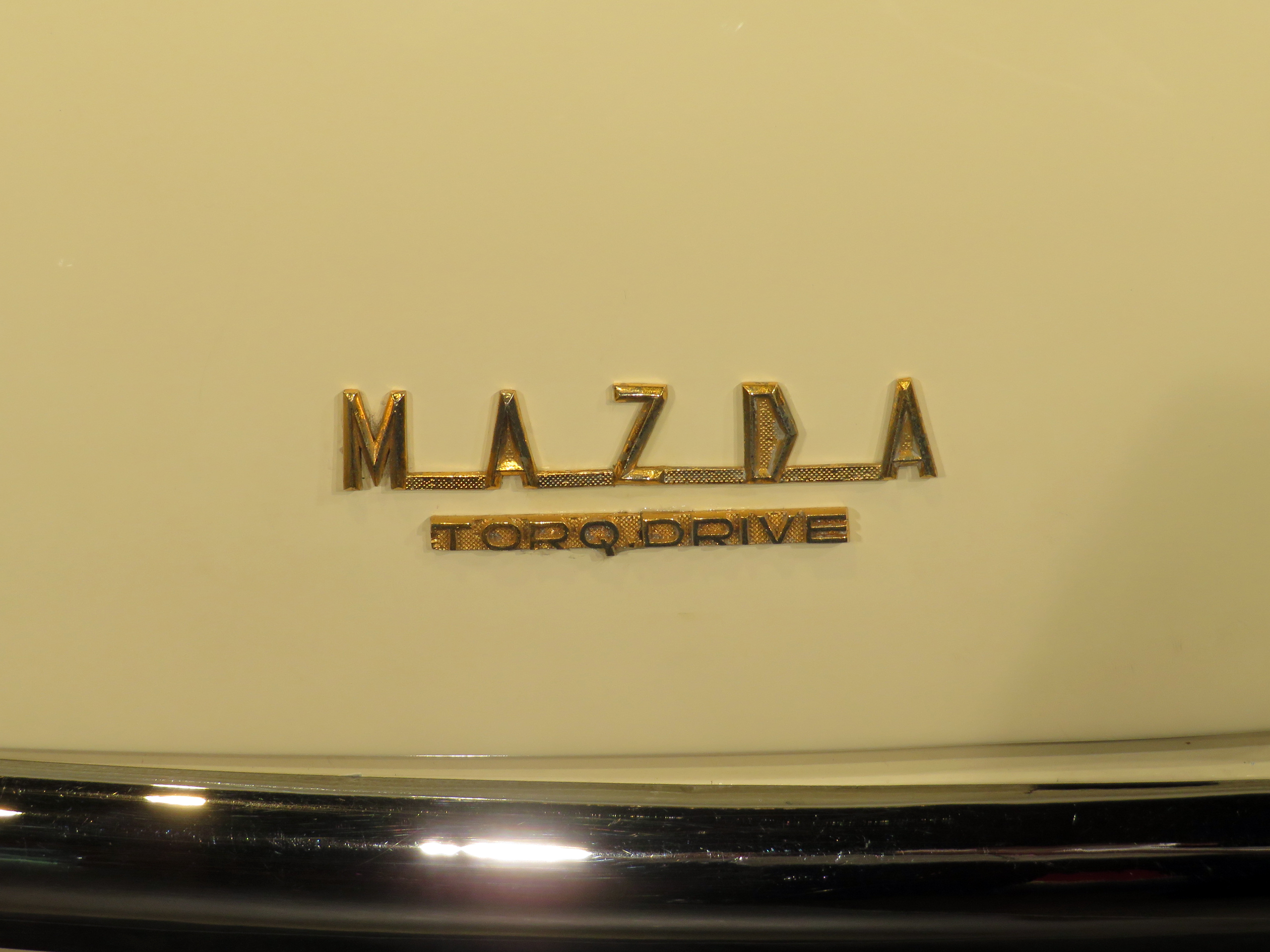
Mazda R360 "TORQ DRIVE" emblem

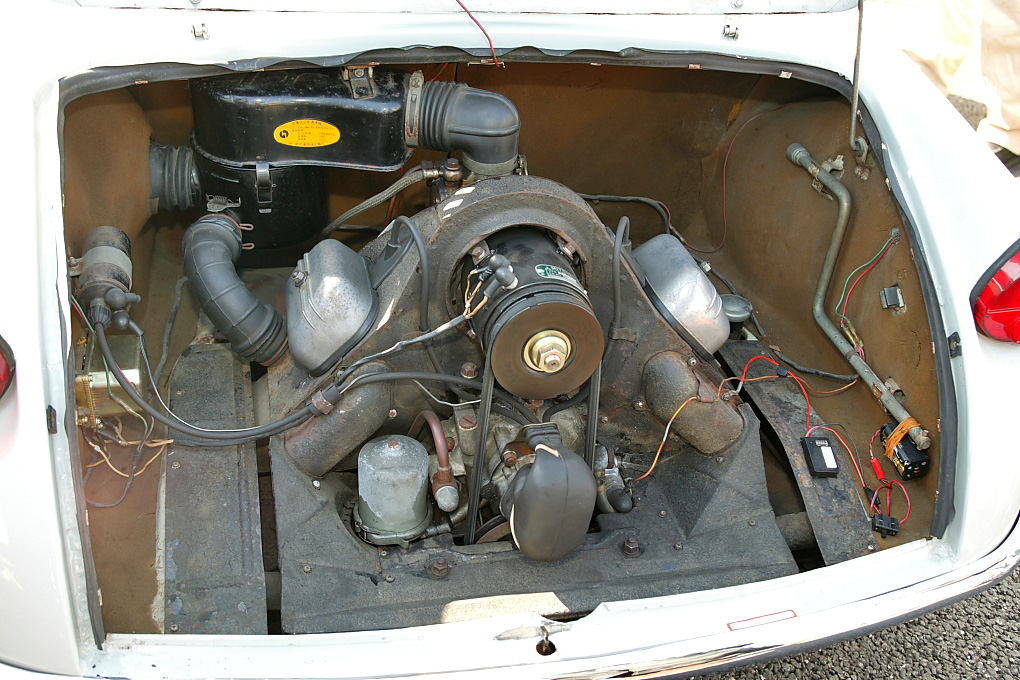
The V-twin engine from an R360 Coupé

Mazda R360, performance and specifications

Maximum Speed	Minimum Turning Radius	Fuel Consumption (with 2 passengers)	Braking Distance
95km/h (85km/h)	4.0m	32km/L (25km/L)	13m(50km/h)

Type	Bore x Stroke	Displacement	Compression Ratio	Maximum Power	Maximum Torque
Forced Air-cooled,2-Cylinder,4-Cycle,90degree V	60 x 63mm	356 cc	8.0	16 PS (12 kW) at 5,300 rpm	2.2 kg⋅m (21.6 N⋅m) at 4,000 rpm

=== Colours ===
The standard Mazda R360 came in three different exterior colours; Opal Green, Maroon Rouge, and Somerset Blue. The Mazda R360 DeLuxe came in two different two-tone variants: Blue and Cream or Red and Cream.

For the interior of the Mazda R360, the official colour choices were Red or Blue. These colour options were applied to the seats, carpet, and inner door panels.

== B360 Pickup ==
The B360 was a pickup truck bodystyle based on parts of the R360 Coupé. It used the same 356 cc engine, but in a front-engine, rear-wheel-drive layout. Like most pickups, it used a rigid rear axle and leaf spring suspension. The engine was replaced with the Carol's 358 cc I4 in 1964, and the B360 was replaced by the Mazda E360 in 1967.

A larger B600 pickup was introduced for the export market. It used a 577 cc version of the Mazda V-twin.
