= 6G (disambiguation) =

6G is a cellular network technology generation

6G or 6-G may also refer to:

== Companies ==
- 6G Mobile, a Dutch telecommunications operator
- Go2Sky (IATA code: 6G), a Slovak airline
- Air Wales (former IATA code: 6G), a former airline

== Other uses ==
- Sixth generation of video game consoles
- Terminus (Doctor Who) (production code: 6G), a 1983 Doctor Who television serial

== See also ==
- Rhodamine 6G (R6G), a chemical compound and dye
- 6G-fructosyltransferase, an enzyme
- G6 (disambiguation)
- T-6G Texan, a model of North American T-6 Texan
