= Genesis Energy =

Genesis Energy may refer to:

- Genesis Energy Investment, a finance company in Hungary.
- Genesis Energy Limited, formerly Genesis Power Limited, a New Zealand electricity company, which trades under the name Genesis Energy.
