= G6 =

G6, G.VI, G.6 or G-6 may refer to:

== International politics ==
- G6 (EU), the six largest European Union members
- Group of Six, a 1975 international summit which led to the G7 and G8
- 44th G7 summit, referred to as the "G6+1" or just "G6" due to a significant internal conflict with the United States

== Transportation ==
- G6 Beijing–Lhasa Expressway, a highway in China

=== Land ===
- Ford G6 an automobile manufactured by the Ford Motor Company of Australia
- Mazda G6 engine, a piston engine made by Mazda
- Pontiac G6, a mid-size car that was produced under the Pontiac brand of American automaker General Motors
- Vossloh G6, shunting locomotive
- XPeng G6, a battery electric mid-size crossover SUV manufactured by XPeng
- LNER Class G6, a class of British steam locomotives

=== Air ===
- Fly Arna (IATA code: G6), an Armenian low-cost airline
- Caudron G.6, a 1916 French reconnaissance aircraft
- Messerschmitt Bf 109 G-6, a variant of a World War 2 German fighter aircraft
- Gulfstream G650, a business jet aircraft

== Electrics, electronics, computing ==
- LG G6, a smartphone manufactured by LG
- Moto G6, a smartphone by Motorola Mobility
- Samsung Galaxy S6, a smartphone by Samsung Mobile

== Other ==
- G6 howitzer, a South African self-propelled howitzer
- G6, the third note in the whistle register
- G6 star, a subclass of G-class stars
- Group 6 element of the periodic table
- G6, a square on a chessboard or a move of a pawn to that square in algebraic chess notation
- "Like a G6", a song by Far East Movement
- G6 Hospitality
- Group of Six conferences, a grouping of NCAA Division I football conferences
- The upcoming 6th generation of My Little Pony, My Little Pony: Forever Friendship

== See also ==
- 6G (disambiguation)
