= INMO =

INMO may refer to:

- Indian National Mathematical Olympiad
- InMo, early name for 6G Mobile, a defunct Dutch telecoms company
- In Mo Yang, South Korean violinist
- Irish Nurses and Midwives Organisation

== See also ==
- Inmos, former British semiconductor company
