= Mazda MPV =

Minivan manufactured by Mazda

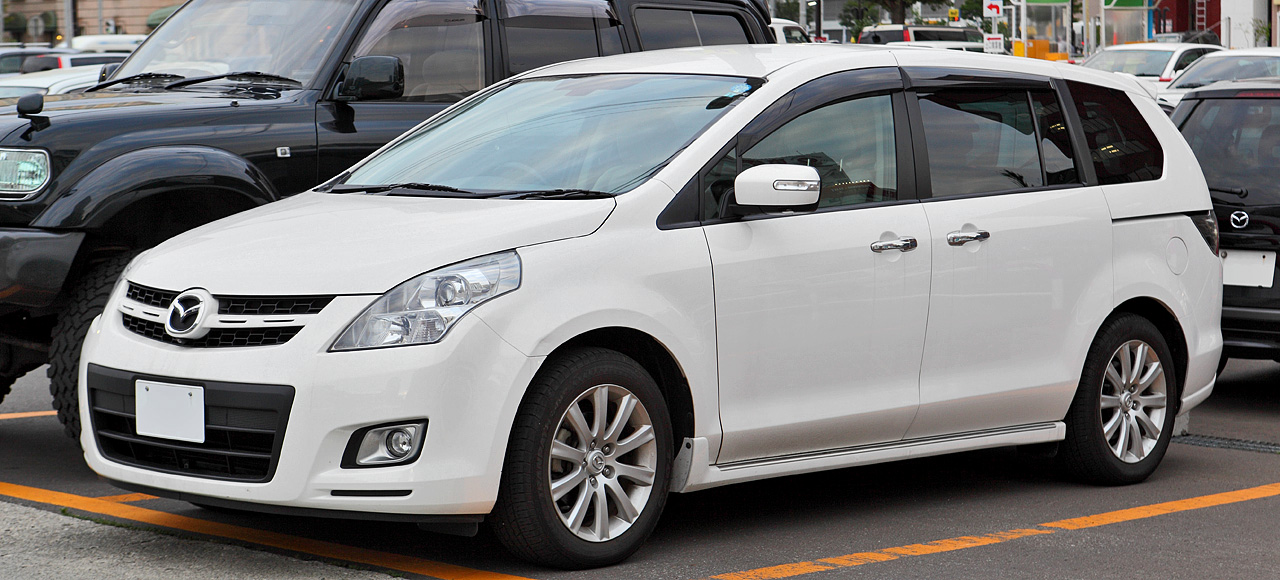

Overview
- Manufacturer: Mazda
- Also called: Mazda8 (2006–2016)
- Production: 1988–2016

Body and chassis
- Class: Minivan

The Mazda MPV (Multi-Purpose Passenger Vehicle) is a minivan manufactured by Mazda. Introduced in 1988 as a rear-wheel-drive model with optional selectable four-wheel drive, this was replaced in 1999 with a front-wheel-drive version with optional all-wheel-drive in some markets. Over one million MPV models have been produced since its introduction.

== First generation (LV; 1988) ==
First generation
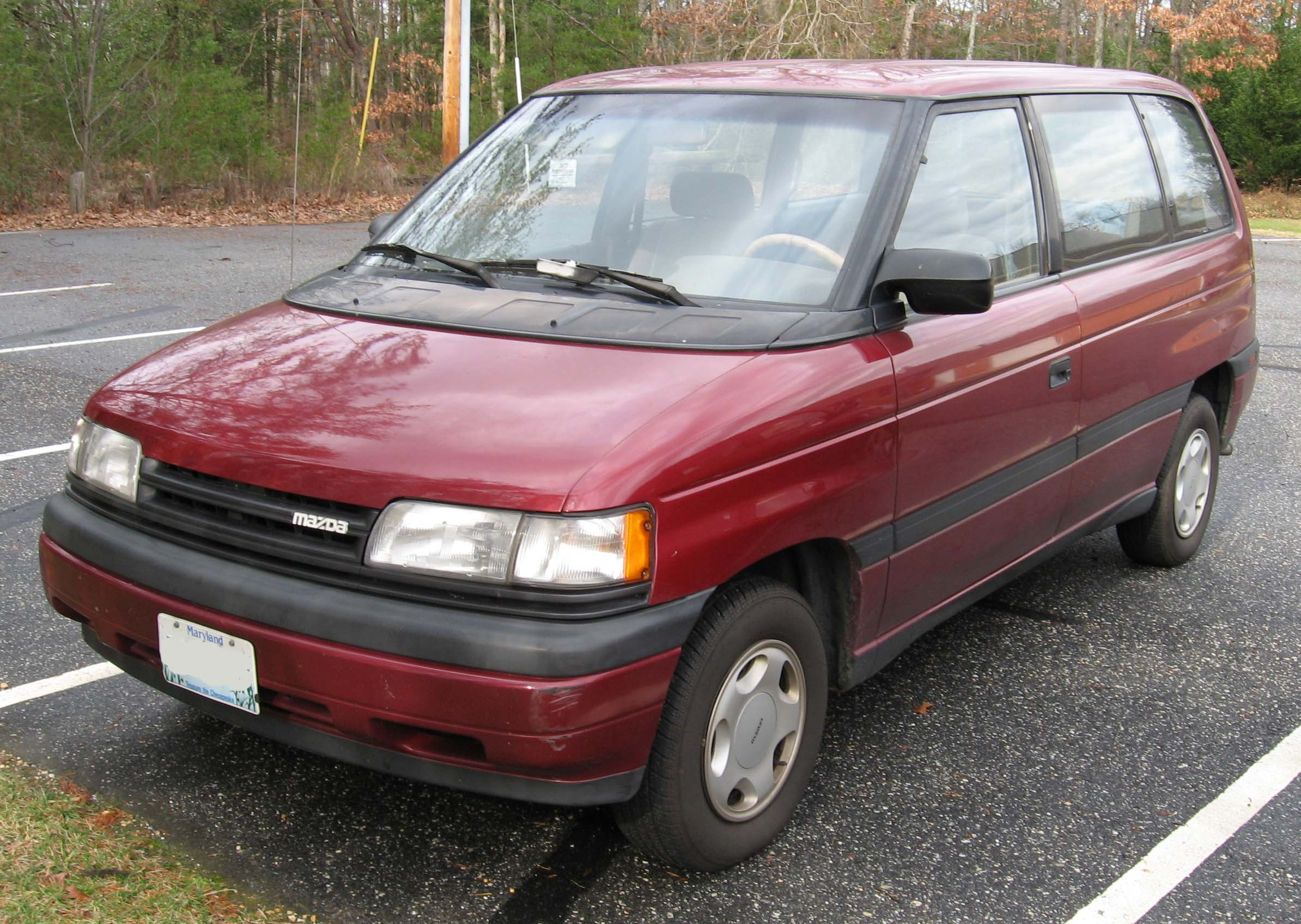

Overview
- Model code: LV
- Also called: Ɛ̃fini MPV (during 1991–1997 in Japan); Haima HMC6450 (China, CKD)
- Production: 1988–1999
- Model years: 1989–1998
- Assembly: Japan: Hiroshima (Hiroshima Plant)

Body and chassis
- Body style: 4-door station wagon (1988–1995); 5-door station wagon (1995–1998)
- Layout: Front-engine, rear-wheel-drive / four-wheel drive
- Related: Mazda 929

Powertrain
- Engine: 2.5 L G5 I4 (1995-1999); 2.6 L G6 I4 (1988–1996); 3.0 L JE V6
- Transmission: 4-speed automatic 5-speed manual

Dimensions
- Wheelbase: 2,804 mm (110.4 in)
- Length: 1988–1994: 4,465 mm (175.8 in); 1995–98: 4,661 mm (183.5 in)
- Width: 1,826 mm (71.9 in); 1991–95 4WD: 1,836 mm (72.3 in)
- Height: 1988–1992 & 1995–98 2WD: 1,730 mm (68.1 in); 1991–92 4WD: 1,798 mm (70.8 in); 1992–94: 1,694 mm (66.7 in); 1992–94 4WD: 1,763 mm (69.4 in); 1995–97 4WD: 1,798 mm (70.8 in); 1998 2WD: 1,750 mm (68.9 in); 1998 4WD: 1,816 mm (71.5 in)
- Curb weight: 1,801 kg (3,970 lb)

The MPV was designed from the ground-up as a minivan specifically for the American market, and was introduced in 1988 for the 1989 model year. It was based on the large rear-wheel-drive Mazda Luce's platform. The platform allowed such options as a V6 engine, and optional four-wheel drive. However this large platform created some liabilities in other markets. When it was introduced in Japan in January 1990, its engine displacement and exterior dimensions exceeded Japanese government regulations for vehicles classified as "compact", and as a result, Japanese buyers were liable for additional annual taxes. It was available at Mazda's Japanese luxury dealership network Ɛ̃fini starting in 1991.

Its selectable 4WD system is not to be confused with all road conditions "all-wheel-drive" systems; the MPV can be switched into locked 4WD with a switch mounted on the column gear selector. A dash mounted switch controlled the center differential, creating a locked power distributions on the front and rear axles. The 4WD is not for use on dry roads, but can be engaged and disengaged while moving. Its efficient use of interior space while offering a relatively small exterior drew from Mazda's experience with space efficient one-box minivans, like the Mazda Bongo.

Unlike other minivans, the MPV's parking brake was directly on the floor beside the driver's seat and operated by the hand, when most other minivans had the parking brake in the driver footwell area and operated by the left foot. Like the later Honda Odyssey introduced in North America in early 1995, it featured traditional hinged doors instead of sliding rear doors, though the original MPV only had a single rear door. This was also the only Mazda MPV generation sold in North America with a manual transmission, offered in the '89 through '91 model years. The middle row was available as a 3-person bench, allowing seating for eight, when most minivans only seated seven. Because of the MPV's optional 4WD, the Mazda Navajo version of the Ford Explorer (sold from 1990 to 1994) was only offered as a two-door, so as to minimize internal competition.

The van was named to Car and Driver magazine's Ten Best list for 1990 and 1991 and featured as one of their "vehicles for the coming (fuel) crisis". Initial sales were strong as well, but rapidly fell off once other makers introduced all-wheel drive and V6 engines. In the years to come, Toyota's 1991 Previa, Nissan's 1993 Quest, and Honda's 1995 Odyssey had entered the market and began diluting Mazda's market share. Sales weren't helped when the MPV received one star out of four in the Australian Australasian New Car Assessment Program (ANCAP) crash tests and a "Marginal" rating in the American Insurance Institute for Highway Safety (IIHS) crash tests for damage to the occupant compartment, tire intrusion into the driver footwell area, poor dummy kinematics, and possibility of injuries to both legs.

In 1992 for the 1993 model year, a new Mazda emblem and a remote keyless entry system were introduced. A standard driver's airbag was later introduced in early 1993.

The van was facelifted in 1995 for the 1996 model year, adding driver's side rear door, passenger side airbag, and extending the nose for improved crash protection. While the four-cylinder engine was retired for the American and Canadian markets, it was replaced with a similar but somewhat smaller 2.5 L unit for the rest of the world. A mild refresh was introduced in 1997 for the 1998 model year with "all-sport" body cladding and wheel arches, and polished alloy wheels. Mazda discontinued the original MPV after the 1998 model year for North America, and after the 1999 model year for the rest of the world.

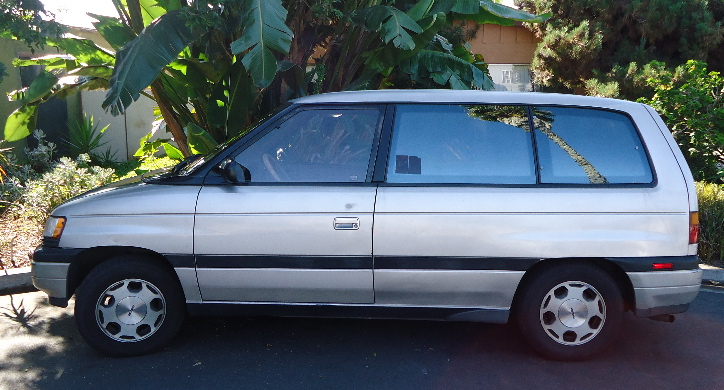
1989–1992 Mazda MPV

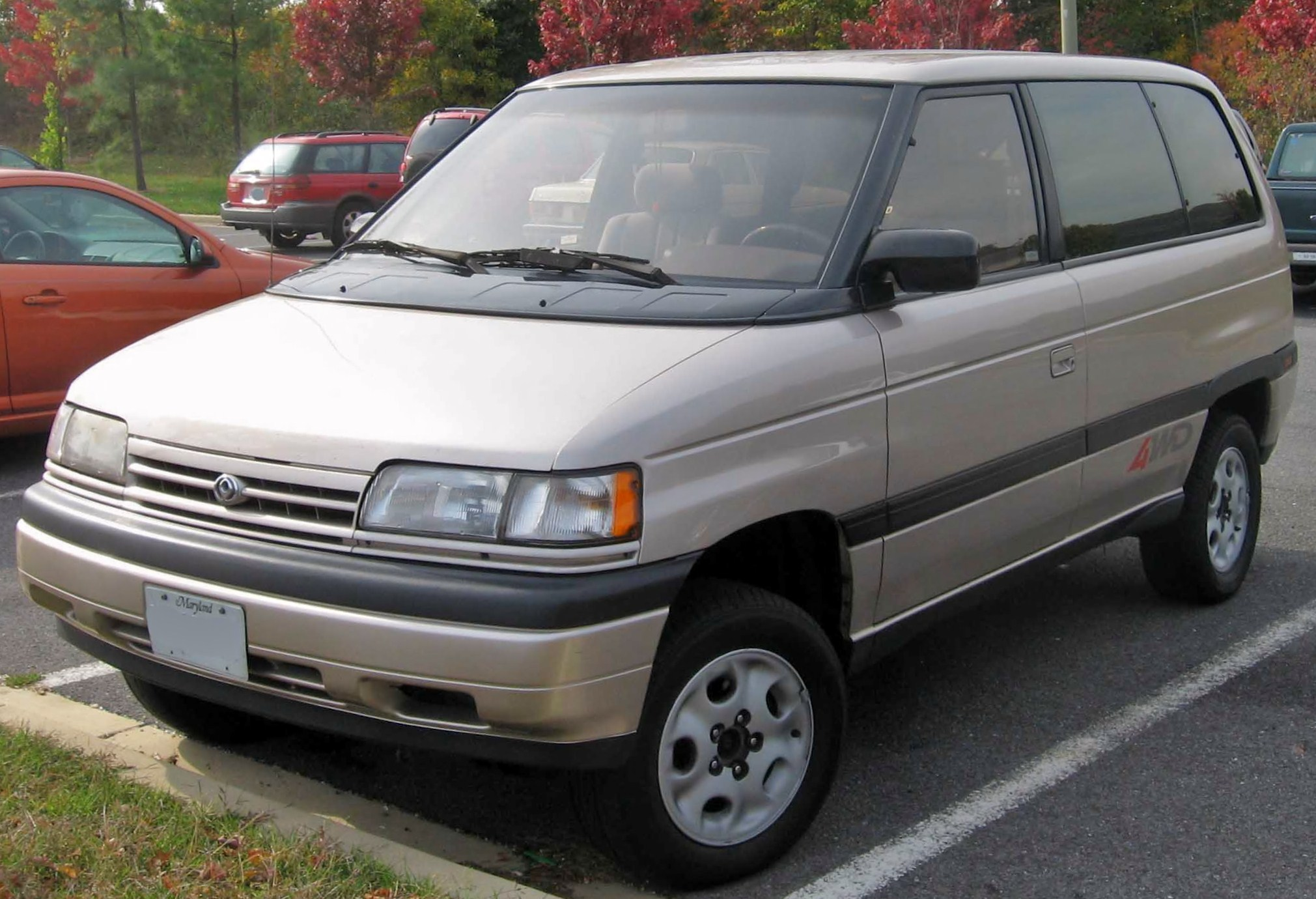
1992–1994 Mazda MPV

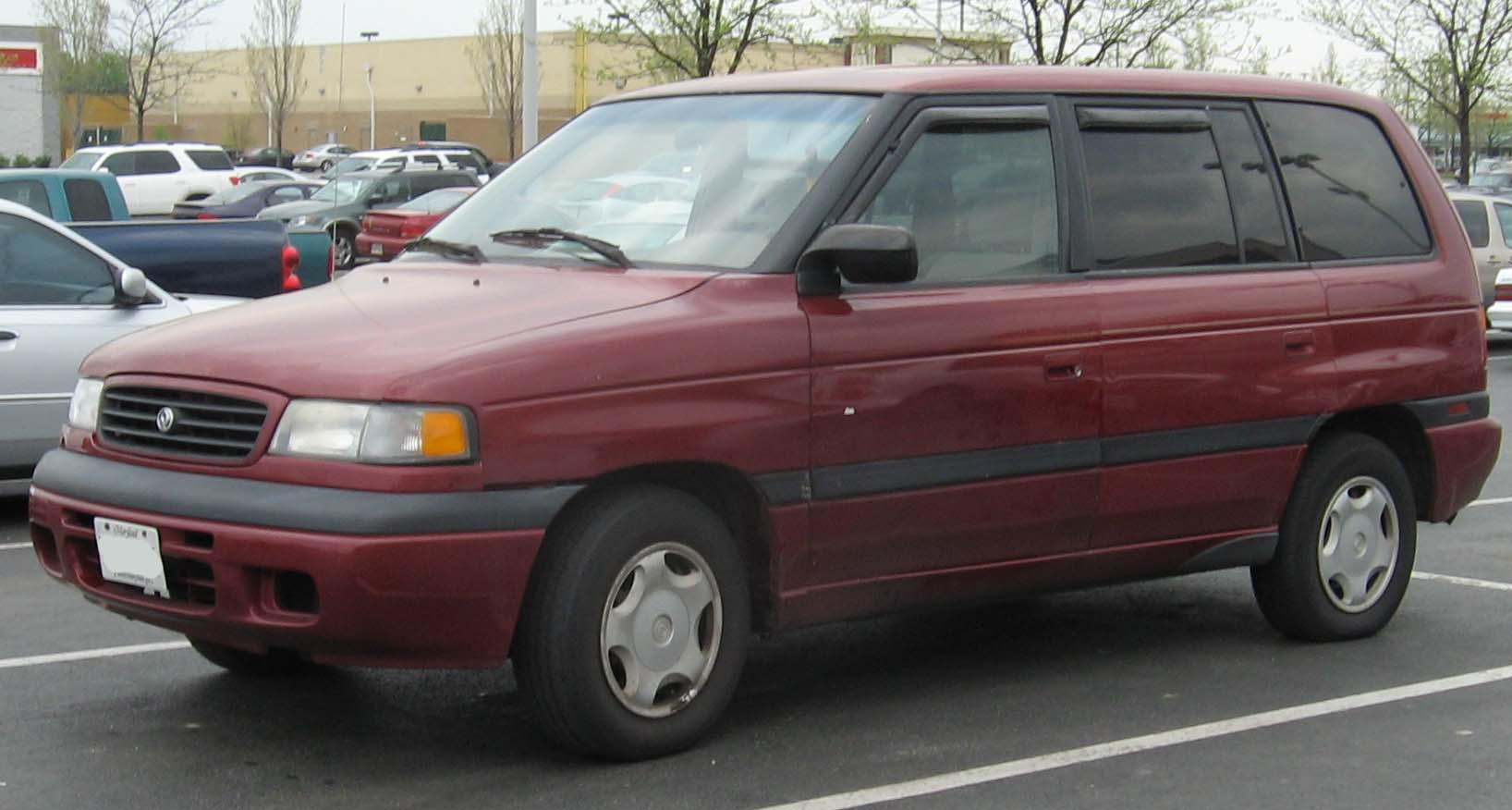
1995–1997 Mazda MPV

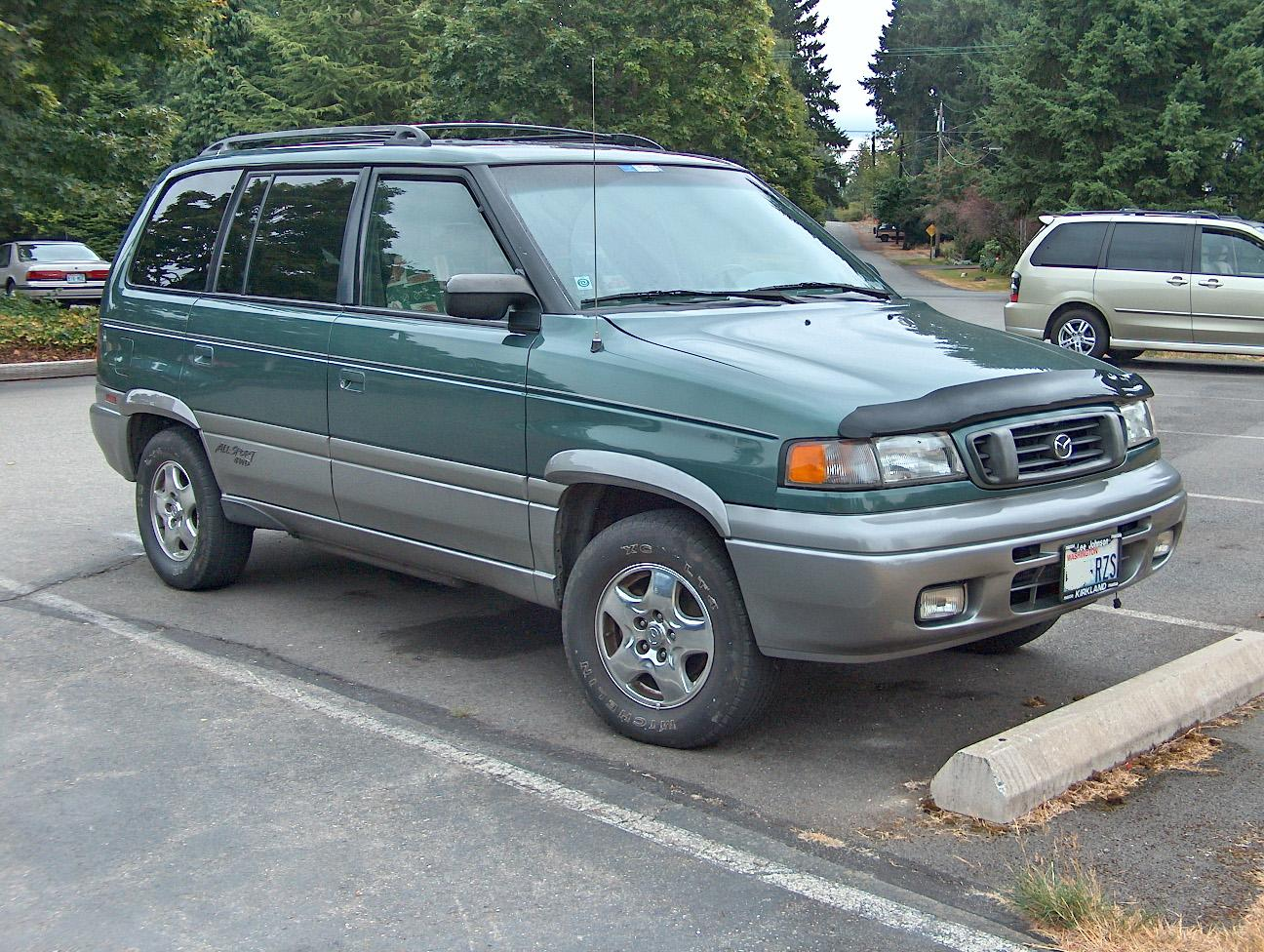
1997–1999 Mazda MPV

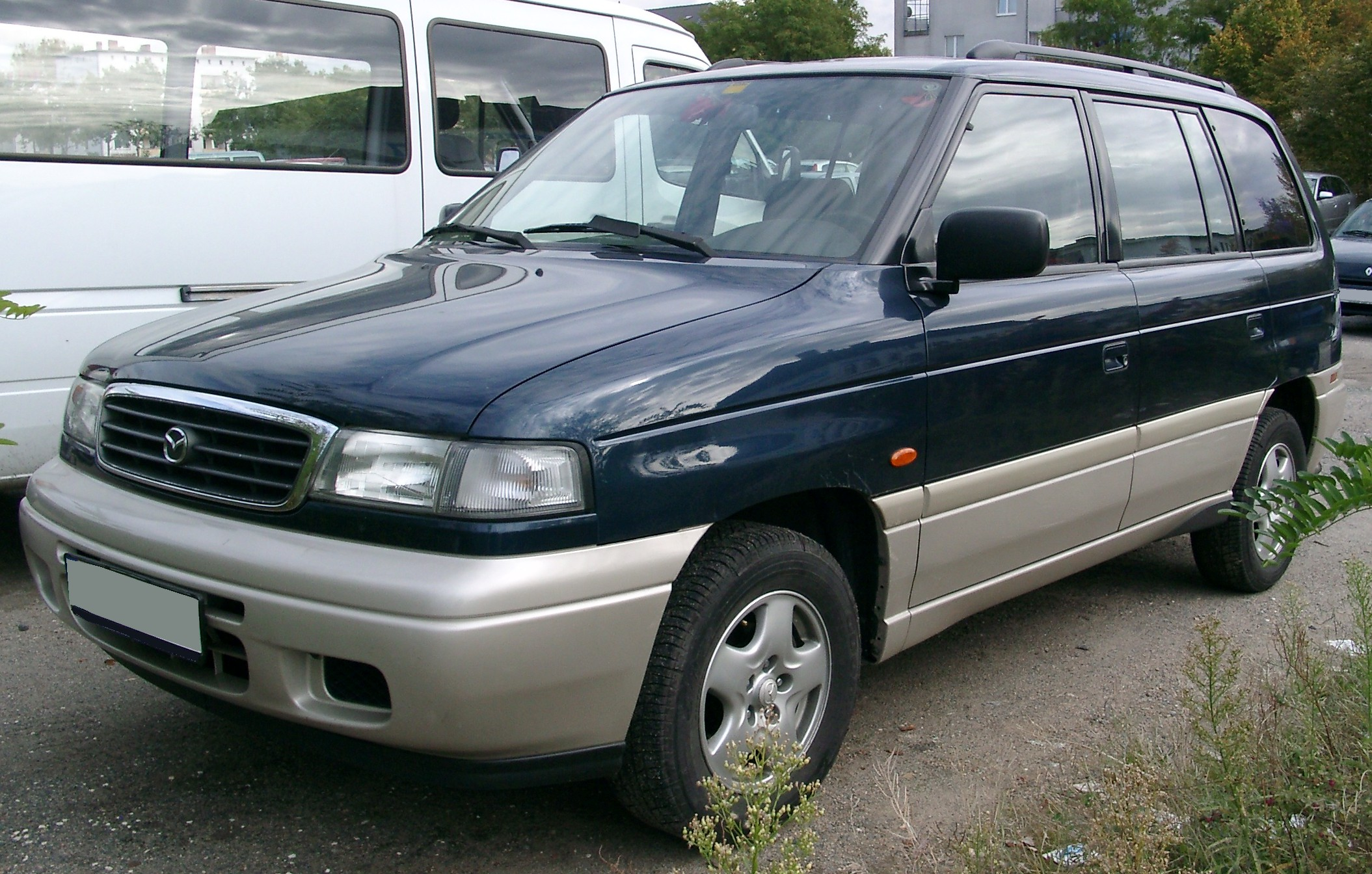
Mazda MPV (Europe)

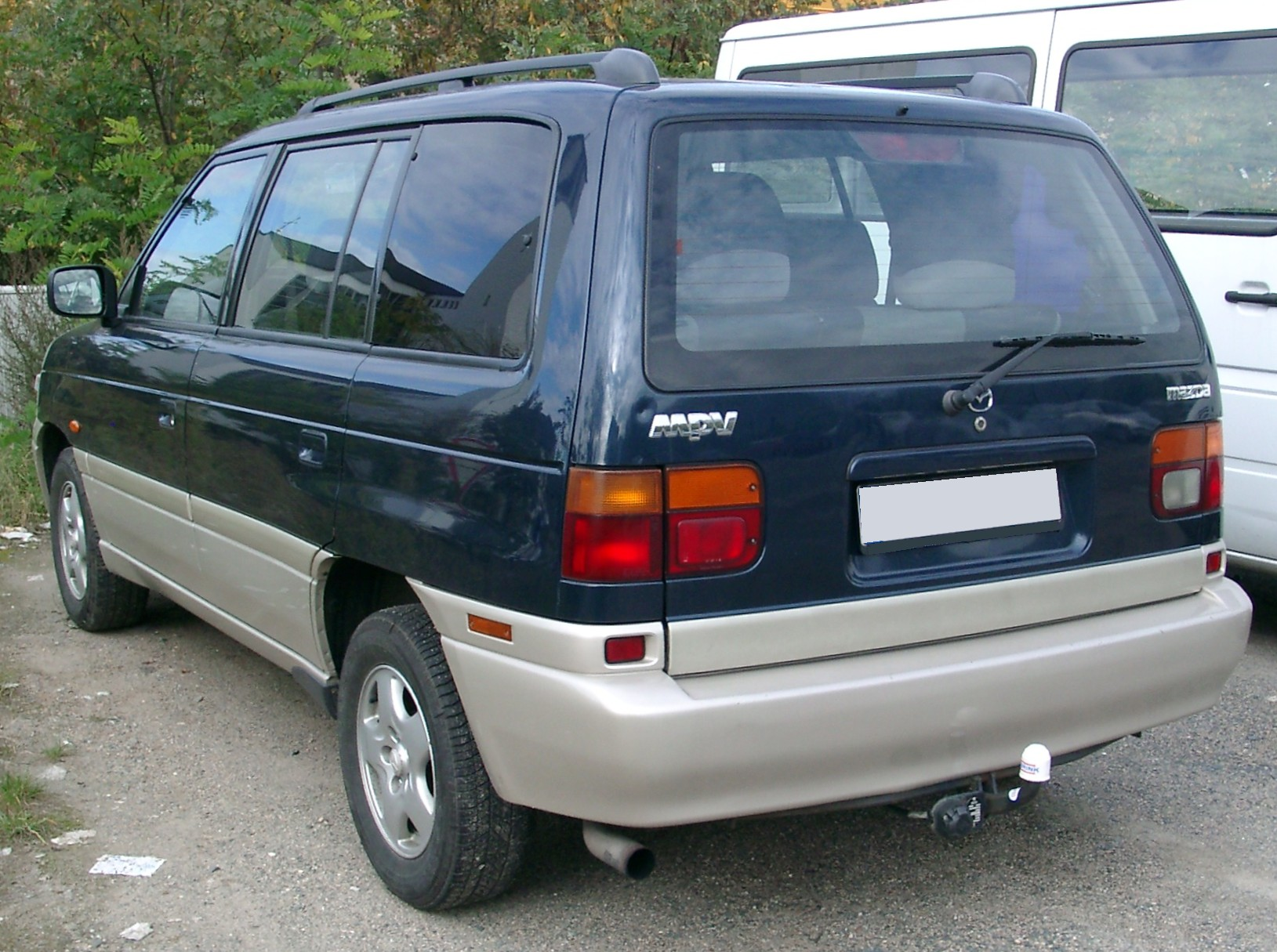
Mazda MPV (Europe)

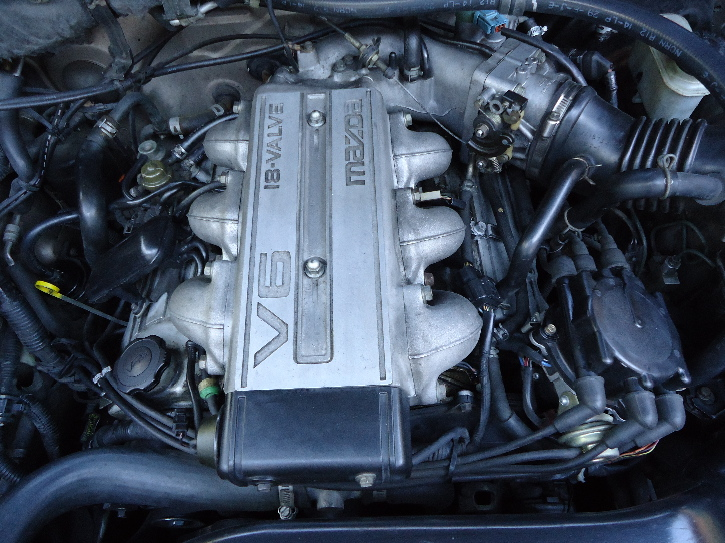
Mazda 18 Valve V6 3.0 L Engine

== Second generation (LW; 1999) ==
Second generation
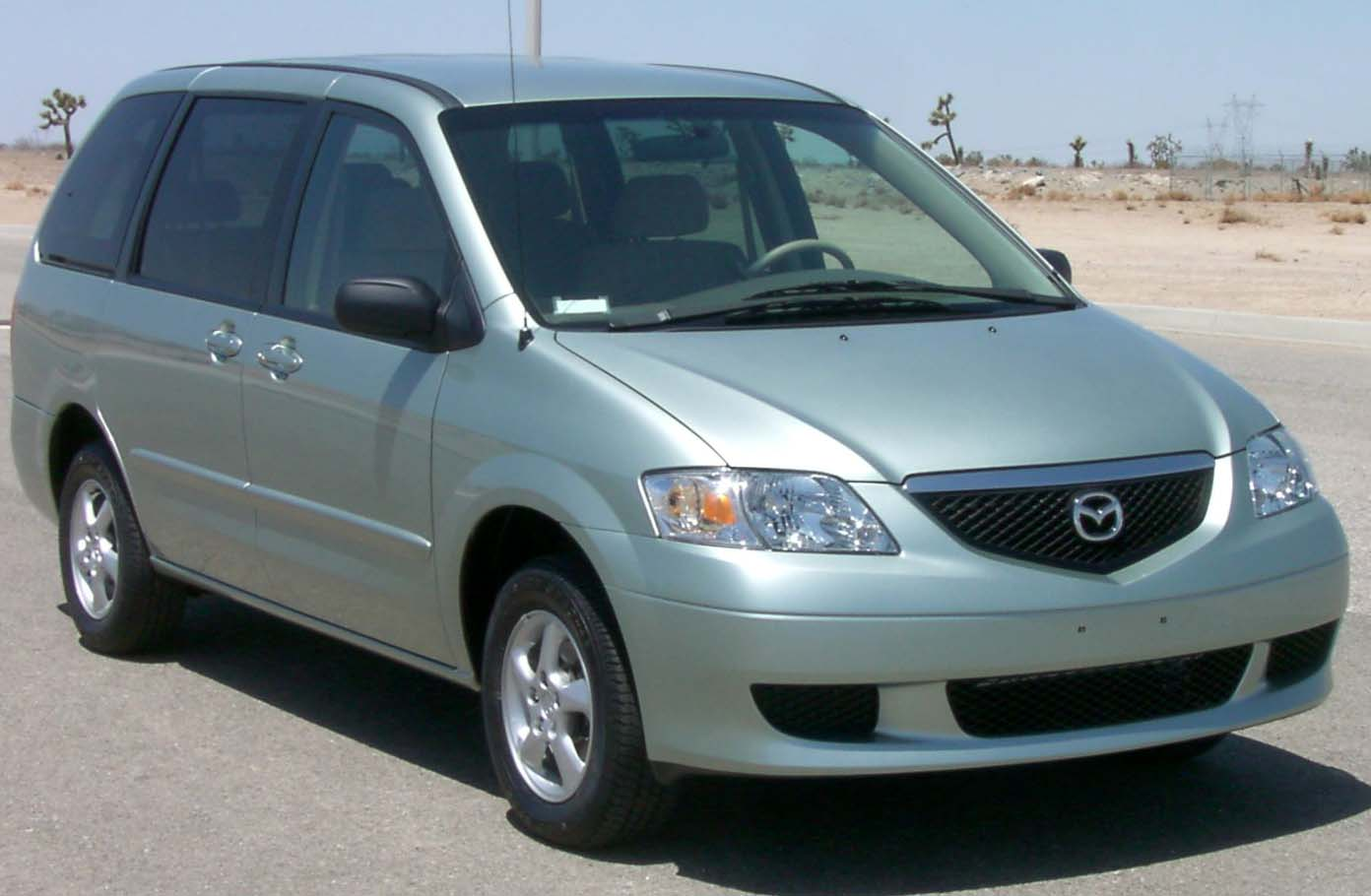
- 2002 Mazda MPV LX (US)

Overview
- Model code: LW
- Production: 1999–2006
- Model years: 2000–2006
- Assembly: Japan: Hiroshima (Hiroshima Plant)

Body and chassis
- Body style: 5-door minivan
- Layout: Front-engine, front-wheel-drive Front-engine, four-wheel-drive
- Related: Mazda Capella; Mazda Tribute

Powertrain
- Engine: 2.0 L FS-DE I4; 2.3 L L3-VE I4; 2.5 L GY-DE V6; 2.5 L AJ V6; 3.0 L AJ V6; 2.0 L RF MZR common rail turbo I4
- Transmission: 5-speed manual; 4-speed automatic; 5-speed JF506E(JA5A-EL) automatic

Dimensions
- Wheelbase: 2,840 mm (111.8 in)
- Length: 1999–01: 4,750 mm (187.0 in); 2002–03: 4,770 mm (187.8 in); 2004–06: 4,813 mm (189.5 in); 2004–06 LX-SV: 4,808 mm (189.3 in)
- Width: 1,830 mm (72.0 in)
- Height: 1,750 mm (68.9 in)
- Curb weight: 1,600–1,660 kg (3,527–3,660 lb)

The MPV was replaced in June 1999, using the short-wheelbase, front-wheel-drive G platform, with the optional 4WD system discontinued in most markets, or replaced with an all-conditions all-wheel-drive system in some markets. It now featured dual sliding rear doors equipped with roll-down windows and a third-row seat that could fold and tumble into a floor recess much like the Honda Odyssey. In the North American markets, the MPV was set apart from other minivans by its comparatively sporty chassis. The new G platform allowed for a longer car with more interior space than the rear-wheel drive predecessor.

In the Japanese domestic market, the second generation was a much stronger seller than its predecessor, with initial orders tripling the projected sales.

At introduction, the MPV used the same 170 hp (127 kW), DOHC 2.5-liter Ford Duratec V6 unit that powered the Ford Contour and Mercury Mystique and Cougar. DX models featured a two-place middle bench seat. The LX model featured two middle buckets with a feature whereby the passenger side seat could slide sideways (marketed as "side by slide"), power windows and locks, heated power mirrors, privacy glass, and antilock brakes. The ES model added leather seating surfaces, wood tone interior trim, side impact air bags on the front seats, bigger wheels, and dual zone front and rear air conditioners.

In the 2001 model year, all models added child-safety seat tether anchors. An optional GFX sport appearance package was made available for LX and ES models, which included fog lights and aero body add-ons. The 2001 model year ran long, extending into early 2002 in anticipation of the 2002 refresh.

In the 2002 model year, North American-market MPVs received Mazda's AJ 3.0 L V6 producing 200 hp (149 kW) and 200 lb⋅ft (271 N⋅m) of torque, a 5-speed automatic transmission, a new grille featuring a single chrome bar at the top, power sliding side doors (not available on the Australian market), revised suspension settings, and 17-inch alloy wheels. In the Japanese and other markets, the 2.0 and 2.5-liter four-cylinders were replaced by the new 2.3 L L3-VE direct injection (DISI) inline-four, as first seen in the all-new Mazda6. In Europe a 136 PS (100 kW), 2.0-liter "MZR" common-rail turbodiesel engine was also available.

In the 2003 model year, power operation of the side doors was made optional on the LX and ES. A base LX-SV model was added midway into the model year.

In the 2004 model year, the MPV received a mild exterior and interior makeover. The exterior featured new headlights and Altezza style clear taillights. Interior changes included a new steering wheel, gauge surrounds, and a spring assist to ease folding the third row seat into the floor. The LX Sport package added a customized look with alloy wheels, body side skirts, enhanced tail lights, anti-lock brakes, an air dam under the bumper, and an optional rear-mounted spoiler. The ES model added leather seats, rear air conditioner, power sliding doors, and a choice of moonroof or roof-mounted DVD player. No LX-SV model was offered.

In the 2005 model year, dual zone air conditioning became an optional feature on the LX (it had been standard on the LX in 2004).

In the 2006 model year, a base LX-SV model was again offered alongside the LX and ES models.

The MPV was discontinued in both Europe and North America after the 2006 model year. The MPV was also replaced in North America and Australia by the full-size Mazda CX-9 crossover SUV. Australian models were available with three seats in the second row, and two seats in the third row instead of a folding third row.

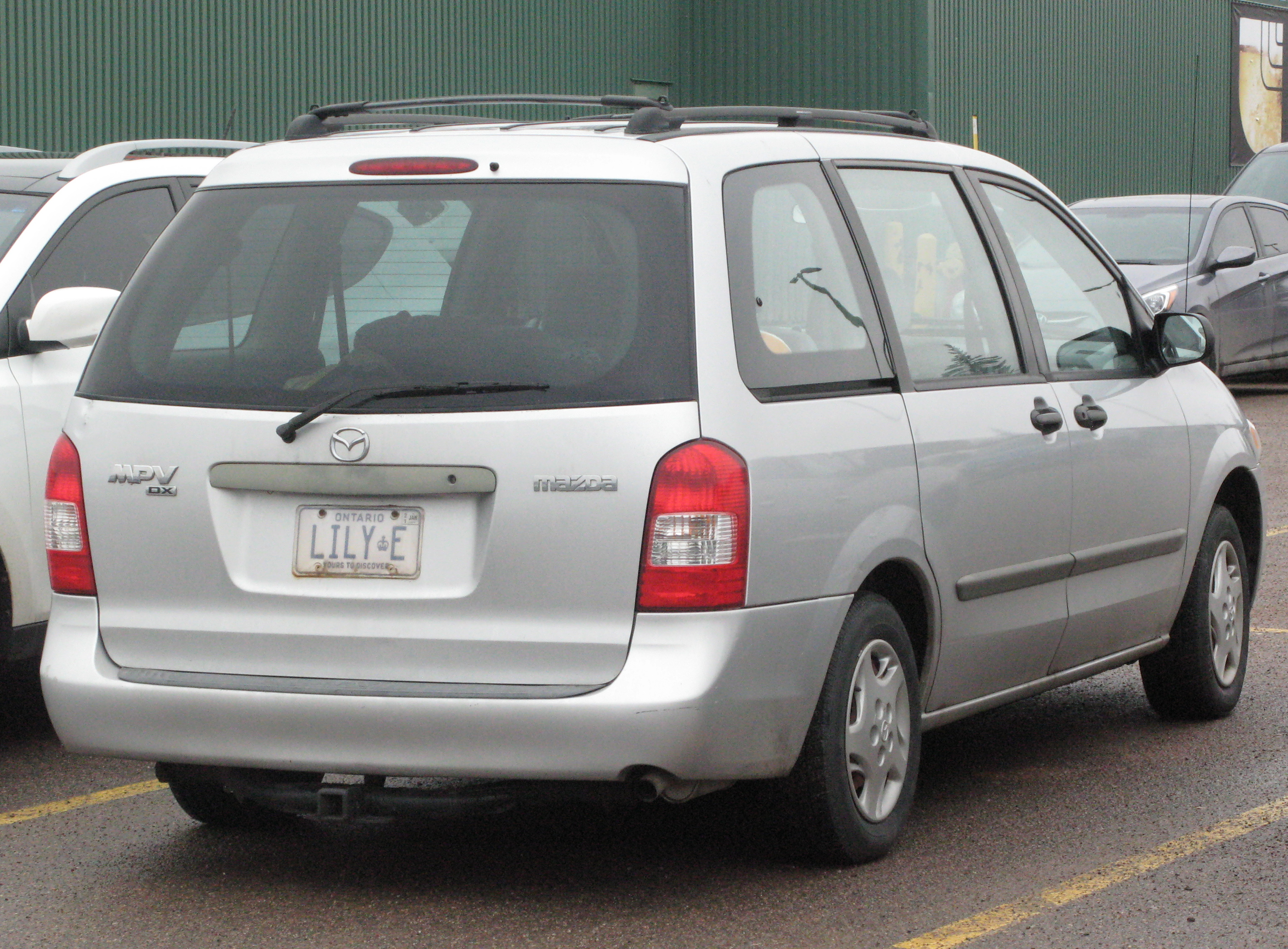
2001 Mazda MPV DX (Canada)

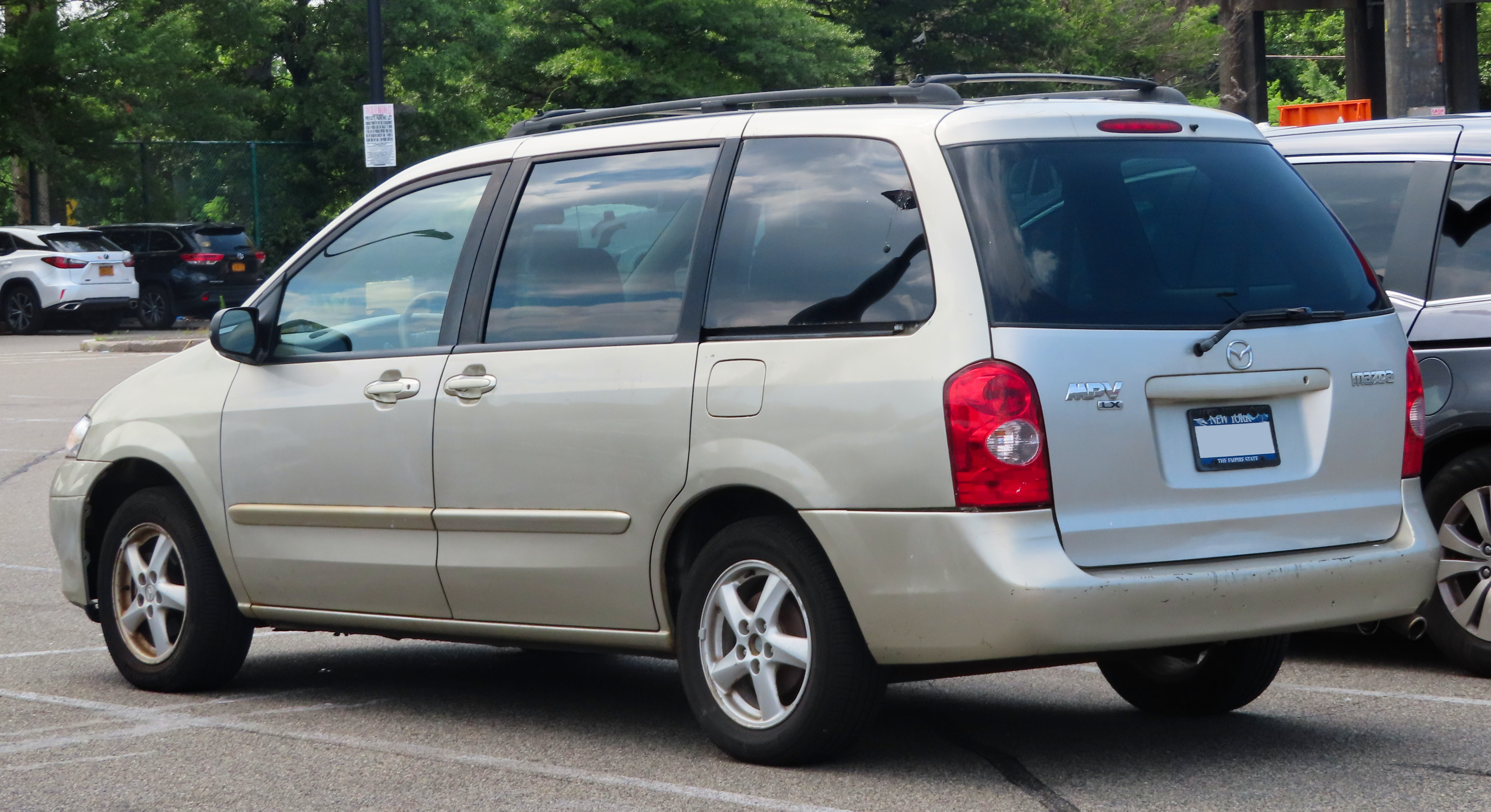
2003 Mazda MPV LX (US)

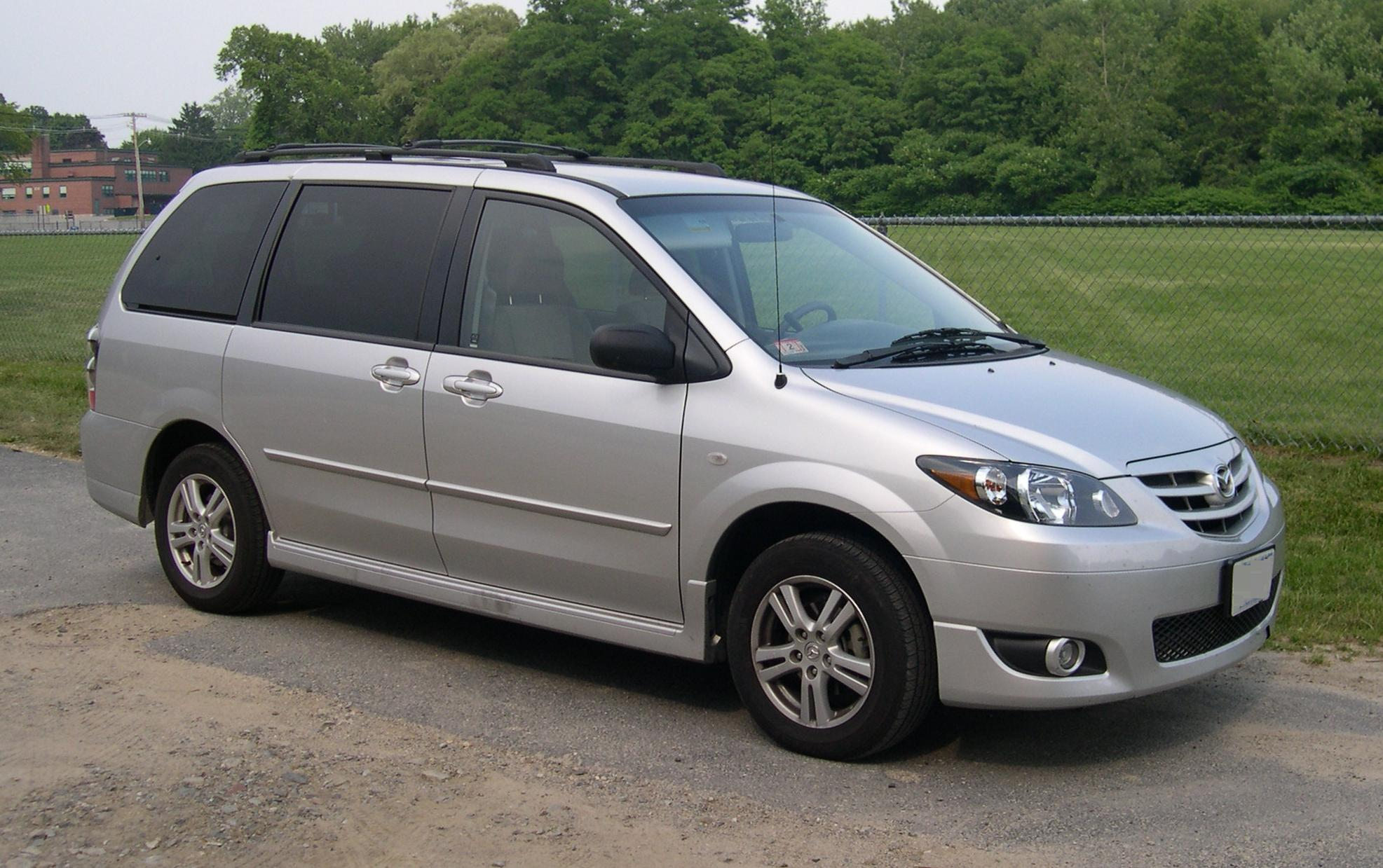
2004–2006 Mazda MPV LX (US)

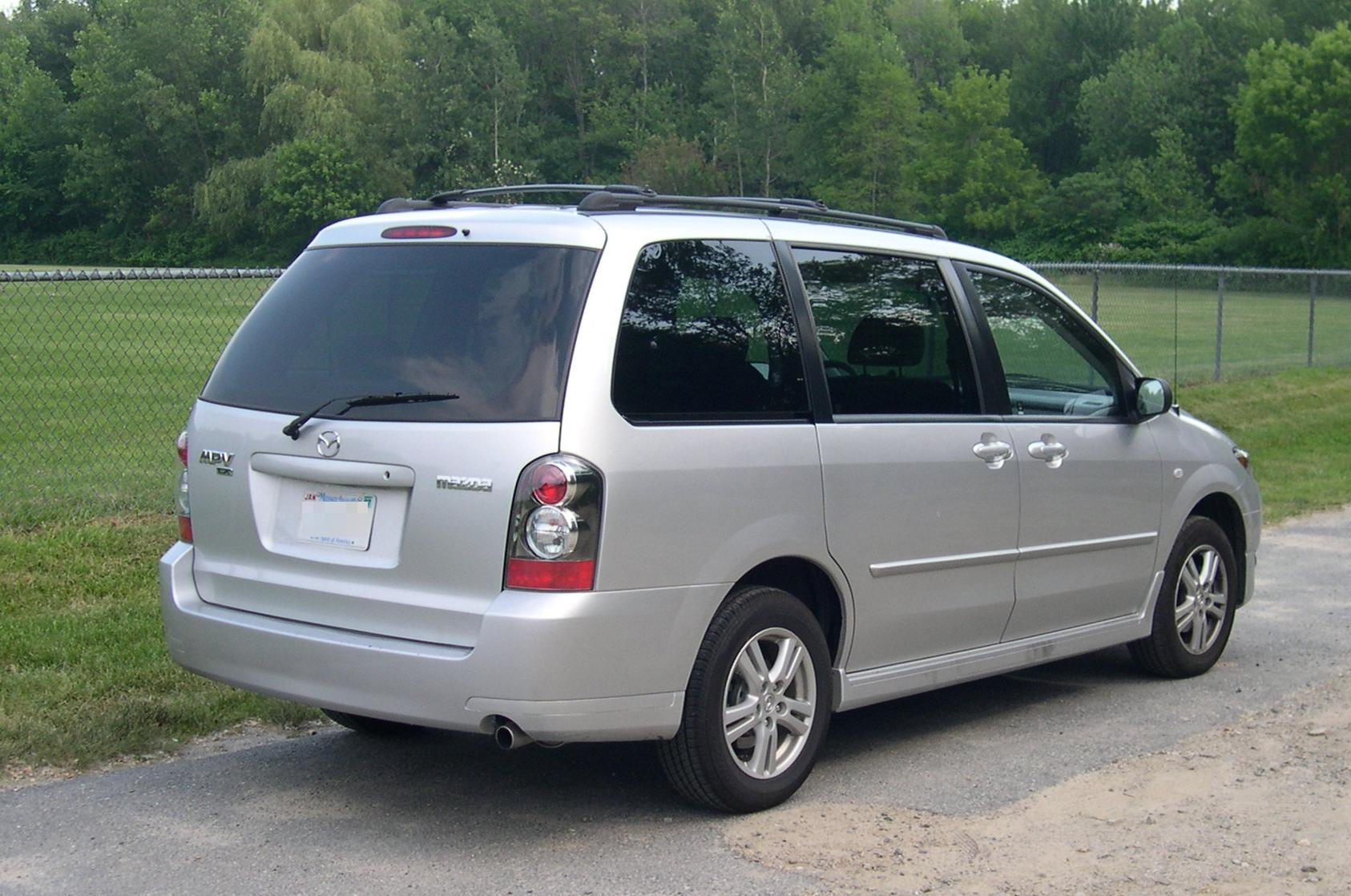
2004–2006 Mazda MPV LX (US)

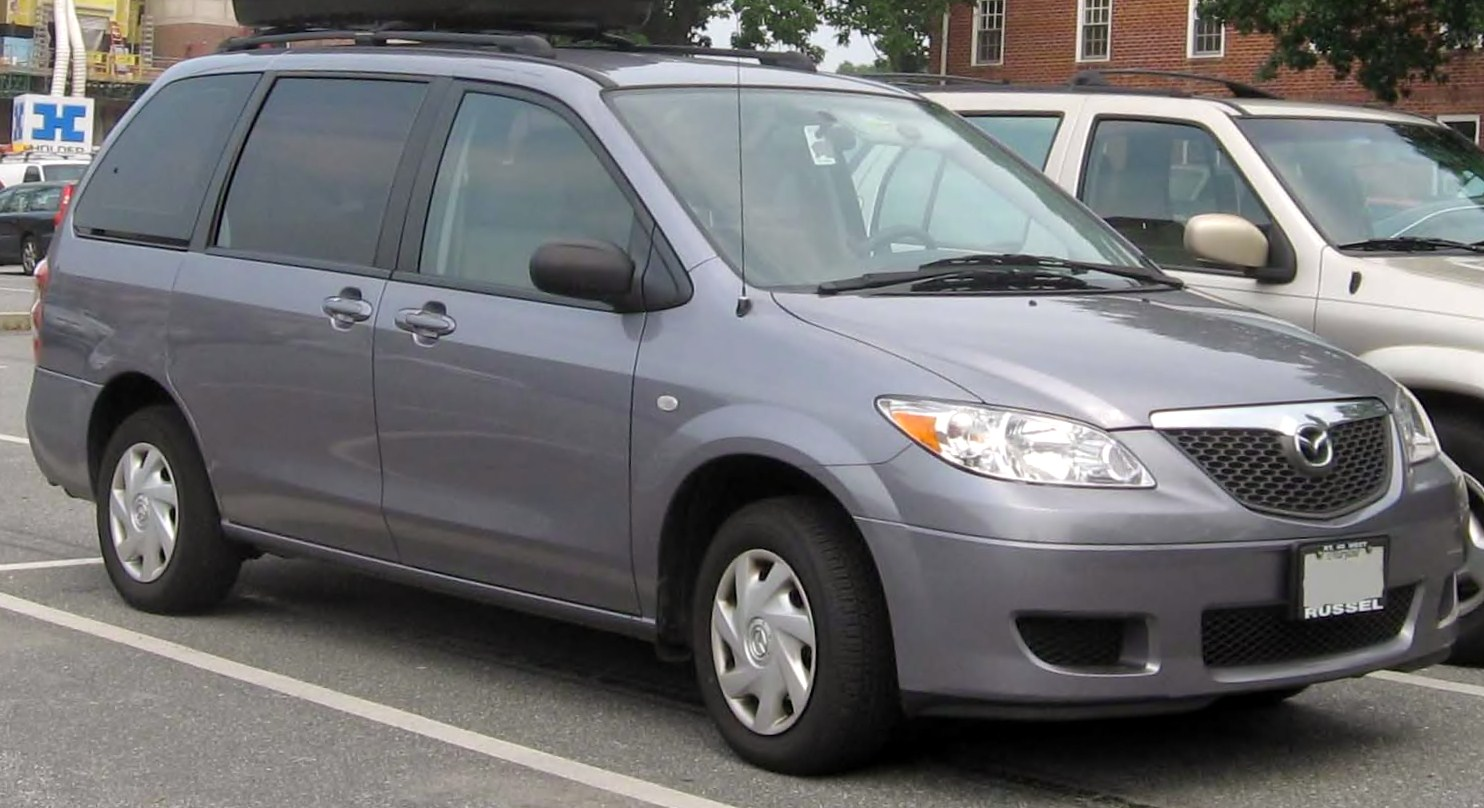
2005–2006 Mazda MPV LX-SV (US)

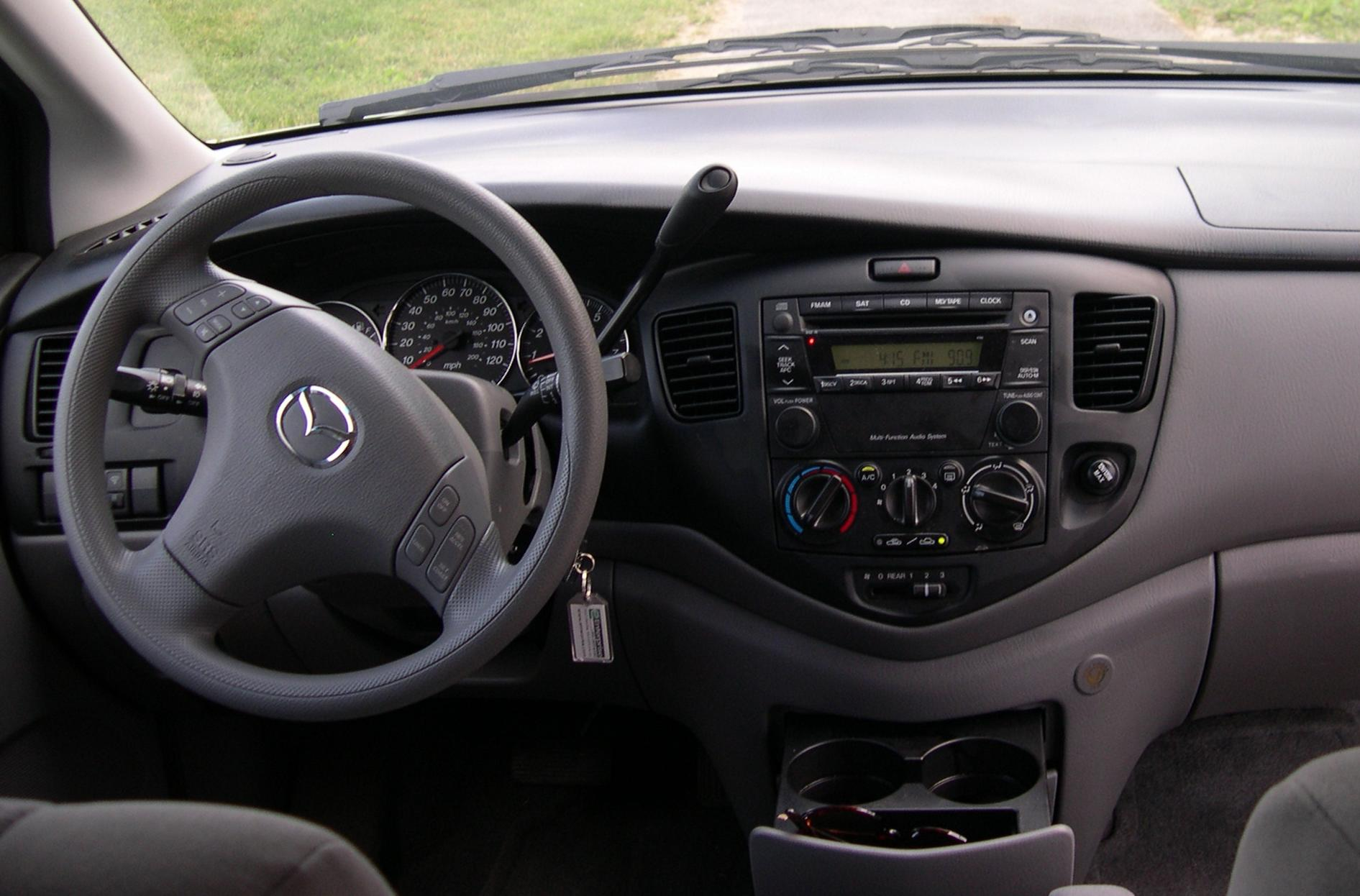
Interior

Engines:

- 1999–2002 2.0 L FS-DE I4 – 122 PS (90 kW) at 5600 rpm (non-US)
- 1999–2002 2.5 L GY-DE V6 (non-US)
- 1999–2002 2.5 L AJ (Duratec) V6
- 2002–2006 3.0 L AJ (Duratec) V6
- 2002–2005 2.3 L MZR 2.3 Direct Injection Spark Ignition (DISI) I4 (non-US)
- 2002–2005 2.0 L MZR RF common rail turbo-diesel I4 (Europe)

The Mazda MPV earned an "Acceptable" rating in the IIHS offset frontal crash test in 2000 for fair structural performance and very high forces on the dummy's right foot. In 2005, it earned a "Poor" rating in the side-impact crash test without the optional side airbags, indicating that high injuries to the driver and rear occupant are possible.

== Third generation (LY; 2006) ==
Third generation
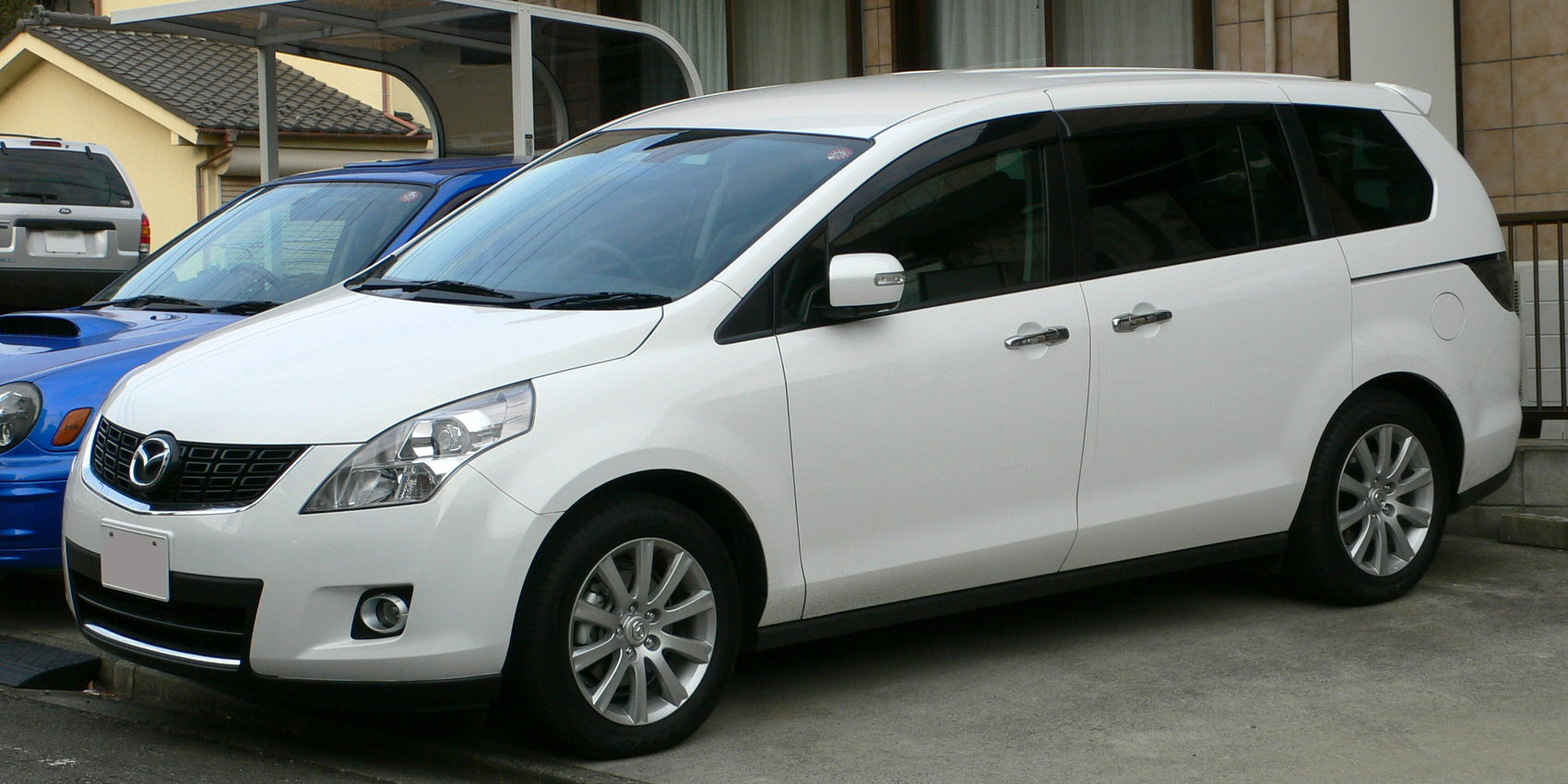

Overview
- Model code: LY
- Also called: Mazda8
- Production: 2006–2016
- Assembly: Japan: Hiroshima (Hiroshima Plant); China: Changchun (FAW Mazda)

Body and chassis
- Body style: 5-door van
- Layout: Front-engine, front-wheel-drive Front-engine, four-wheel-drive (Japan)
- Related: Mazda6

Powertrain
- Engine: 2.3 L L3-VE I4; 2.3 L L3-VDT turbo I4
- Transmission: 4/5/6-speed automatic

Dimensions
- Wheelbase: 2,950 mm (116.1 in)
- Length: 4,868 mm (191.7 in) 2007-2016: 4,860 mm (191.3 in) 2008–2016:
- Width: 1,850 mm (72.8 in)
- Height: 1,685 mm (66.3 in)

In February 2006, the third generation Mazda MPV went on sale in Japan, having debuted earlier in October 2005 at the Tokyo Motor Show. It was powered by either a four-cylinder MZR Direct Injection Spark Ignition (DISI) 2.3-litre naturally aspirated engine or the turbo version of the same. The second row reclining seats featured an unusual retracting footrest feature. The gear shift was moved from the steering column to the center console, much like most other minivans by Japanese automakers today. The launch of the third generation MPV was famously known for its television commercials narrated by a middle-aged woman saying the tagline, "Supōtsukā no hassō de, miniban wo kaeru." (スポーツカーの発想で、ミニバンを変える。The idea of a sports car - inherited by a minivan.)

The third generation MPV was available only in Japan, China, Hong Kong, Macau, Thailand, Indonesia, Singapore, Malaysia and New Zealand. It was known as the Mazda8 in Hong Kong, Macau, Indonesia, Singapore and Malaysia. The 4WD and Turbo models are available only in the domestic (Japanese) market, while all export models (usually known as Mazda8) are naturally aspirated FWD models only. In New Zealand, it was known as the MPV and is available in four-cylinder only.

It was not sold to North America, Europe and other LHD markets besides China. The Mazda CX-9 (North America and Australasia only) and Mazda5 filled the segment gap in these markets.

In 2008, a facelifted version was introduced. External modifications include a new front bumper with new fog lights. A five-speed automatic transaxle replaced the four-speed unit used in NA FWD models. Six-speed Automatics remained in the turbo and 4WD models.

Turbo models were discontinued in 2010. A Malaysian version was introduced that year, making this the fourth market in which the third generation Mazda MPV was to be sold.

In 2012, a 2.5L engine version mated with five-speed automatic replaced the 2.3L with four-speed in China.

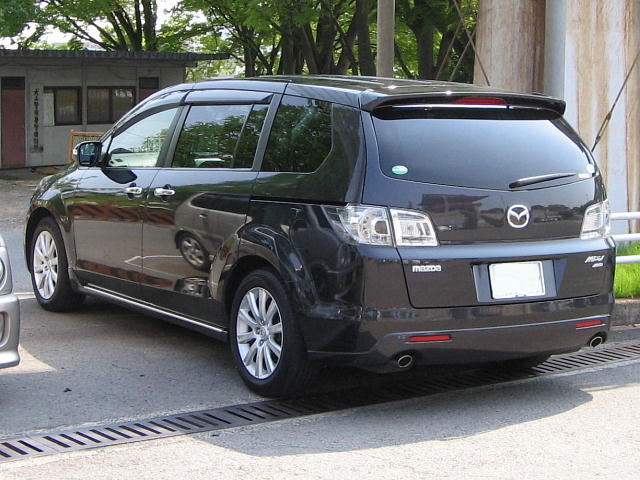
Mazda MPV (Japanese spec)

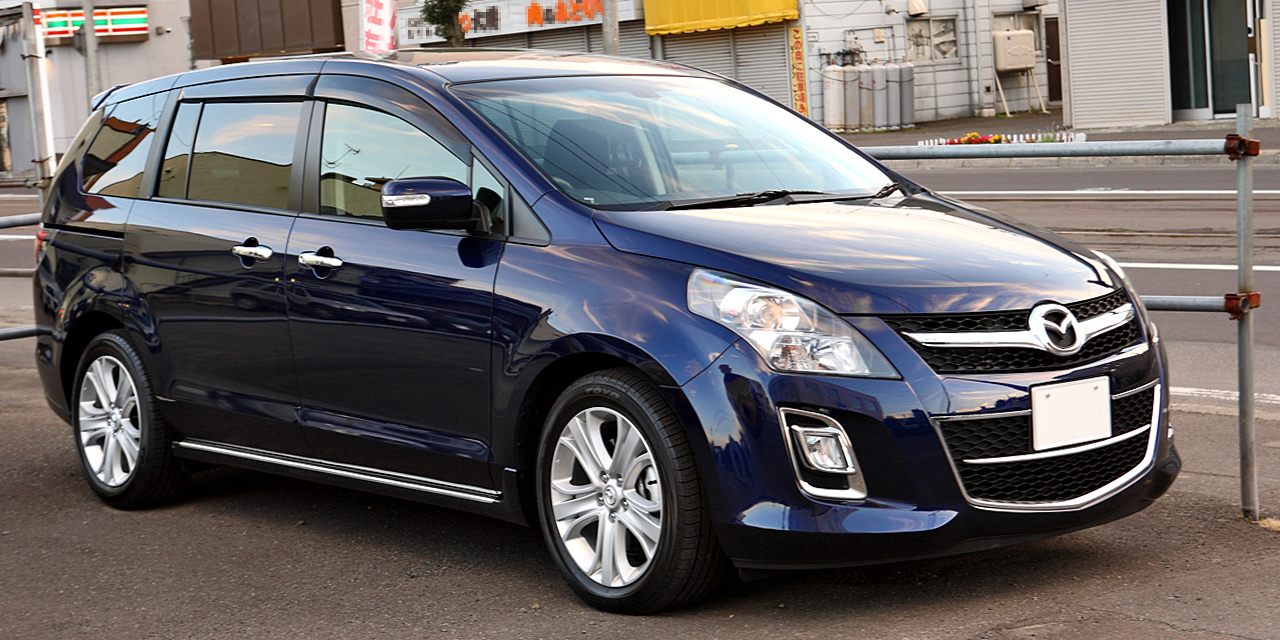
Mazda MPV (facelift)

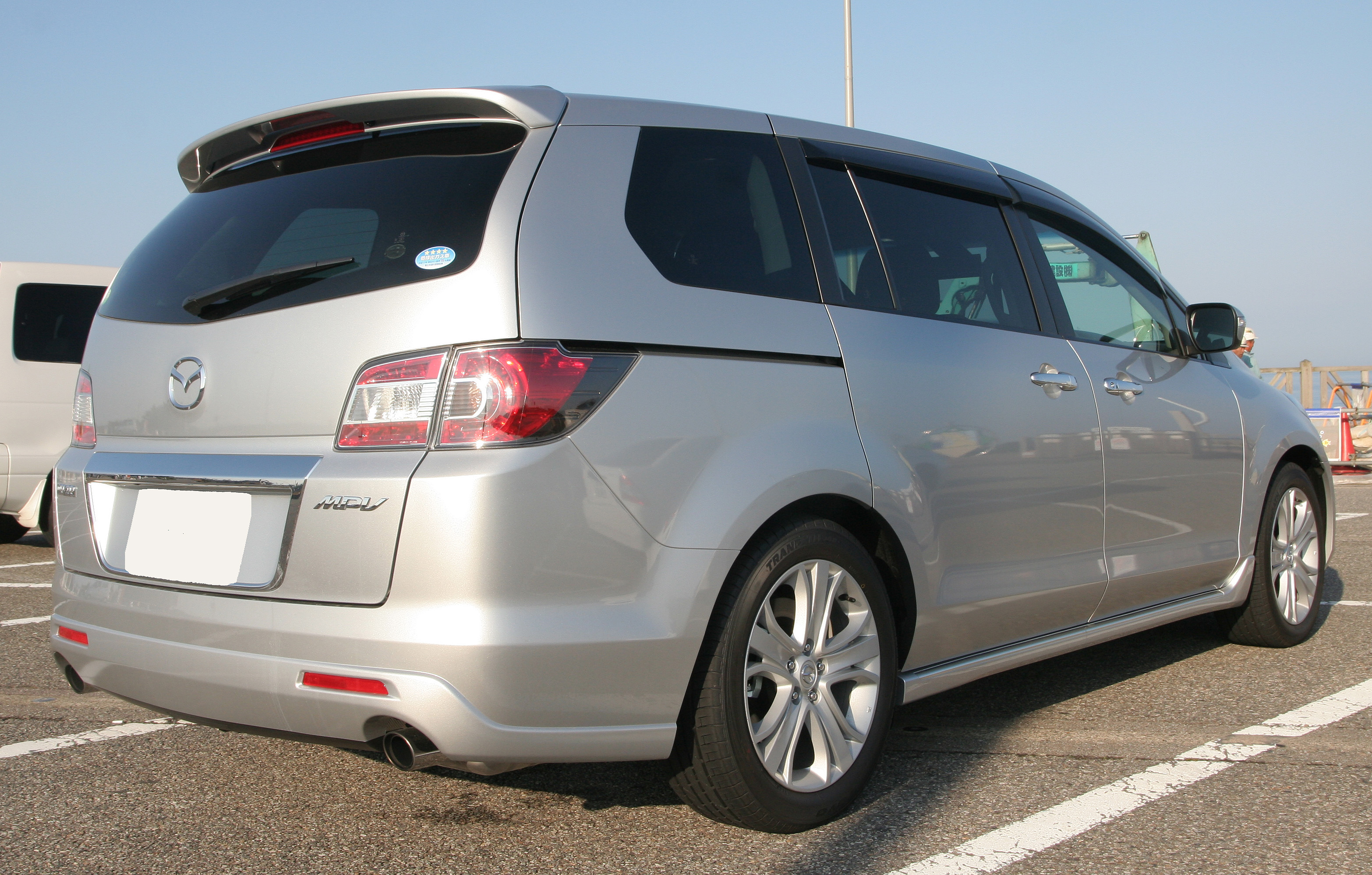
Mazda MPV (facelift)

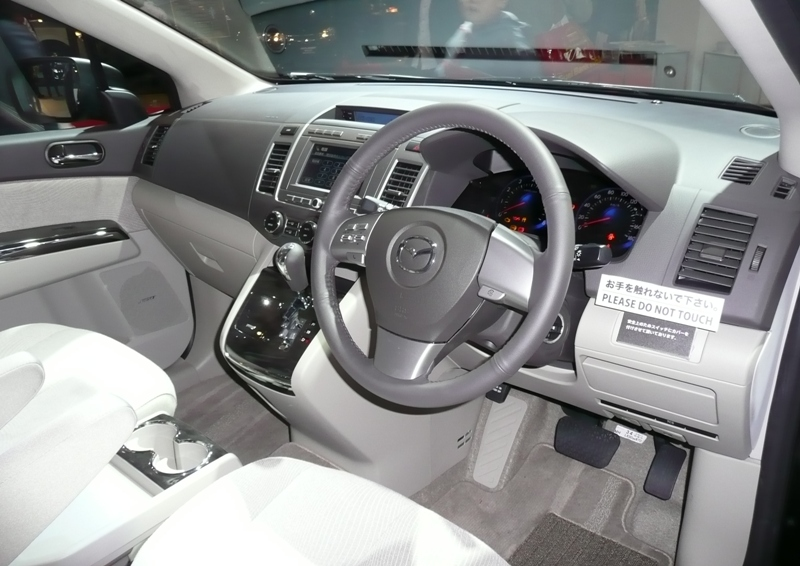
Interior
