= Hun Mining =

Hungarian investment company

Hun Mining, previously known as Genesis Energy Investment Company and Genesis Mining is an investment company based in Budapest, Hungary. From 2007 to 2010 Genesis Energy Investment Company was invested in the photovoltaics market, producing solar panels with thin film technology. In 2010 it sold the solar panel manufacturing and technology units to Denver-based Cogenco International for €15 million so that it could concentrate on mining activities. It was renamed Genesis Mining in the wake of this sale. In lage 2011 it changed its name again to Hun Mining. In late 2011 the company sold its mining operation to Davies Corporation, announcing plans to acquire mobile telecommunications company 6GMOBILE.
