= 6G-fructosyltransferase =

Class of enzymes

Identifiers
- EC no.: 2.4.1.243

Databases
- IntEnz: IntEnz view
- BRENDA: BRENDA entry
- ExPASy: NiceZyme view
- KEGG: KEGG entry
- MetaCyc: metabolic pathway
- PRIAM: profile
- PDB structures: RCSB PDB PDBe PDBsum
Search
- PMC: articles
- PubMed: articles
- NCBI: proteins

In enzymology, a 6G-fructosyltransferase (EC 2.4.1.243) is an enzyme that catalyzes the chemical reaction

[1-beta-D-fructofuranosyl-(2->1)-]m^{+}1 alpha-D-glucopyranoside + [1-beta-D-fructofuranosyl-(2->1)-]n^{+}1 alpha-D-glucopyranoside $\rightleftharpoons$ [1-beta-D-fructofuranosyl-(2->1)-]m alpha-D-glucopyranoside + [1-beta-D-fructofuranosyl-(2->1)-]n^{+}1 beta-D-fructofuranosyl-(2->6)-alpha-D-glucopyranoside (m > 0; n >$\rightleftharpoons$ 0)

Thus, the two substrates of this enzyme are [[[1-beta-D-fructofuranosyl-(2->1)-]m+1 alpha-D-glucopyranoside]] and [[[1-beta-D-fructofuranosyl-(2->1)-]n+1 alpha-D-glucopyranoside]], whereas its 4 products are [[[1-beta-D-fructofuranosyl-(2->1)-]m alpha-D-glucopyranoside]], [[[1-beta-D-fructofuranosyl-(2->1)-]n+1]], [[beta-D-fructofuranosyl-(2->6)-alpha-D-glucopyranoside (m > 0; n >=]], and 0.

This enzyme belongs to the family of glycosyltransferases, specifically the hexosyltransferases. The systematic name of this enzyme class is 1F-oligo[beta-D-fructofuranosyl-(2->1)-]sucrose 6G-beta-D-fructotransferase. Other names in common use include fructan:fructan 6G-fructosyltransferase, 1F(1-beta-D-fructofuranosyl)m, sucrose:1F(1-beta-D-fructofuranosyl)_{n}sucrose, 6G-fructosyltransferase, 6G-FFT, 6G-FT, and 6G-fructotransferase.
