= Mazda G engine =

Overview
- Manufacturer: Mazda
- Production: From 1989 to 2014

Layout
- Configuration: Inline-4
- Displacement: 2.6 L (2,606 cc)
- Cylinder bore: 92 mm (3.62 in)
- Piston stroke: 98 mm (3.86 in)
- Cylinder block material: cast iron
- Cylinder head material: Aluminum
- Valvetrain: SOHC 3 valves x cyl.
- Valvetrain drive system: Chain
- Compression ratio: 8.4:1

RPM range
- Max. engine speed: 6000 rpm

Combustion
- Fuel system: EFi
- Fuel type: Gasoline
- Cooling system: Water

Output
- Power output: 121 hp (90 kW; 123 PS)
- Specific power: 39.1 hp (29.2 kW; 39.6 PS)
- Torque output: 202

Chronology
- Successor: Ford EcoBoost engine (Mazda GY)

The G family of Mazda engines is a family of large inline-four piston engines that was commercialized from 1989 to 2014. The series started at 2.6 L for the Mazda B-Series truck from 1988. Prior to that, a 2.6 L Mitsubishi engine had been used.

== G54B ==
The 2.6 L Mazda G54B was actually a Mitsubishi engine. It displaces 2.6 L (2,555 cc) and was used in the B2600 pickup from 1986 to 1988, until Mazda developed their own suitable engine.

== G6 ==
Mazda replaced the G54B with its own 2.6 L G6 engine which displaces 2.6 L (2,606 cc). Bore and stroke are 92 mm × 98 mm (3.62 in × 3.86 in). The G6 was produced until 1993 and made 121 hp (90 kW), 149 lb⋅ft (202 N⋅m) for North American models. The G6E which replaced it was used in other markets around the world.

Compression Ratio: 8.4

Valve train: 12V SOHC

Applications:

- 1989–1993 Mazda B2600i
- 1998–2006 Mazda B2600
- 1989–1996 Mazda MPV
- 2007-2014 Mazda BT-50

== G5 ==
The 2.5 L G5 was an evolution of the G6. It produces 102 hp (76 kW; 103 PS) at 4000 rpm.

Applications:

- 1995 Mazda B2500
- 1996-1999 Mazda MPV

== GY ==
The GY is not at all related to the Mazda G-series four-cylinder engines and is listed in this article strictly by engine code association. GY is the Mazda engine code for a 2.5 L (2,494 cc) Ford Duratec V6 engine which, due to an OEM deal with Ford, was built by Mazda in Japan for limited use in the 1999-2001 Mazda MPV. This Duratec V6 engine was in turn based on the original Mazda KL 2.5 L (2,495 cc) from 1991. By the late 1990s (during the Mazda/Ford partnership) Ford executives had ordered Mazda to cease development of V6 engines and instead focus on a new range of four-cylinder engines for both companies' benefit, which would become the MZR/Duratec lineup of inline-four engines. The order to discontinue their own V6 development included the Mazda K engine, leaving Mazda the only option of employing later Ford V6s, which were considerably cheaper to manufacture.

Applications:

- 1999-2001 Mazda MPV (second generation)

== See also ==
- Mazda engines
