= 6G Mobile =

Dutch telecommunications operator

6GMOBILE B.V.
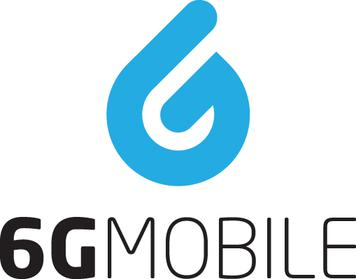
- Industry: Telecommunications
- Headquarters: Amsterdam
- Area served: Netherlands
- Products: Mobile telecommunications
- Website: http://www.6gmobile.nl

6GMOBILE was a Dutch telecommunications operator that declared bankruptcy in 2012. It combined mobile (GSM), fixed voice and Internet technologies into a single network. It was fully licensed and operational as a GSM operator in the Netherlands.

== Company history ==
6GMOBILE has been operating under various company names since 2006. It started as a joint venture under the name InMo, partially owned by Infonet Corp which was acquired by BT. BT acquired all the shares of InMo in February 2008, renaming the company to BT inmo. It became an independent company in 2009 after a management buyout and changed its name to 6GMOBILE.

In April 2013 the company was sold to 6G Internet, which launched a new service to UK customers by offering fixed wireless internet access to homes at speeds of up to 300meg making it the fastest ISP in Europe.

== Services ==
6GMOBILE used the KPN GSM/UMTS radio network in the Netherlands. It had a flexible signalling and switching infrastructure with interconnections to BT and KPN. Its IT backoffice has been structured to support a multitude of brands and services. 6GMOBILE is a wholesale supplier of turnkey solutions to create private label mobile telecommunication services.

In August 2009, 6GMOBILE launched its own brand Tringg. Tringg offers SIM-only services with unlimited voice calls and SMS messages and 3G data for a fixed amount based on a Fair Use Policy.

In April 2010, 6GMOBILE launched Kruidvat Mobiel in a joint effort with the Kruidvat retail chain. It is a prepaid subscription that is positioned as the lowest priced prepaid offering in the Dutch market, in line with the Kruidvat prizefighter policy.

In September 2010, 6GMOBILE is supplying the platform for the Amsterdam soccer club Ajax Amsterdam MVNO, Ajax Mobiel. Ajax Mobile offer free on-net calls. Customers can also choose from a number of value-added services related to the team, some of which are free.

In May 2012 it was declared bankrupt.
