= Renesis =

Renesis may refer to:

- Renesis (engine), an engine used in the 2004-2011 Mazda RX-8
- Renesis Player, a SVG 1.2 compatible renderer and viewer
