= Mazda Cosmo =

Sports coupé manufactured by Mazda

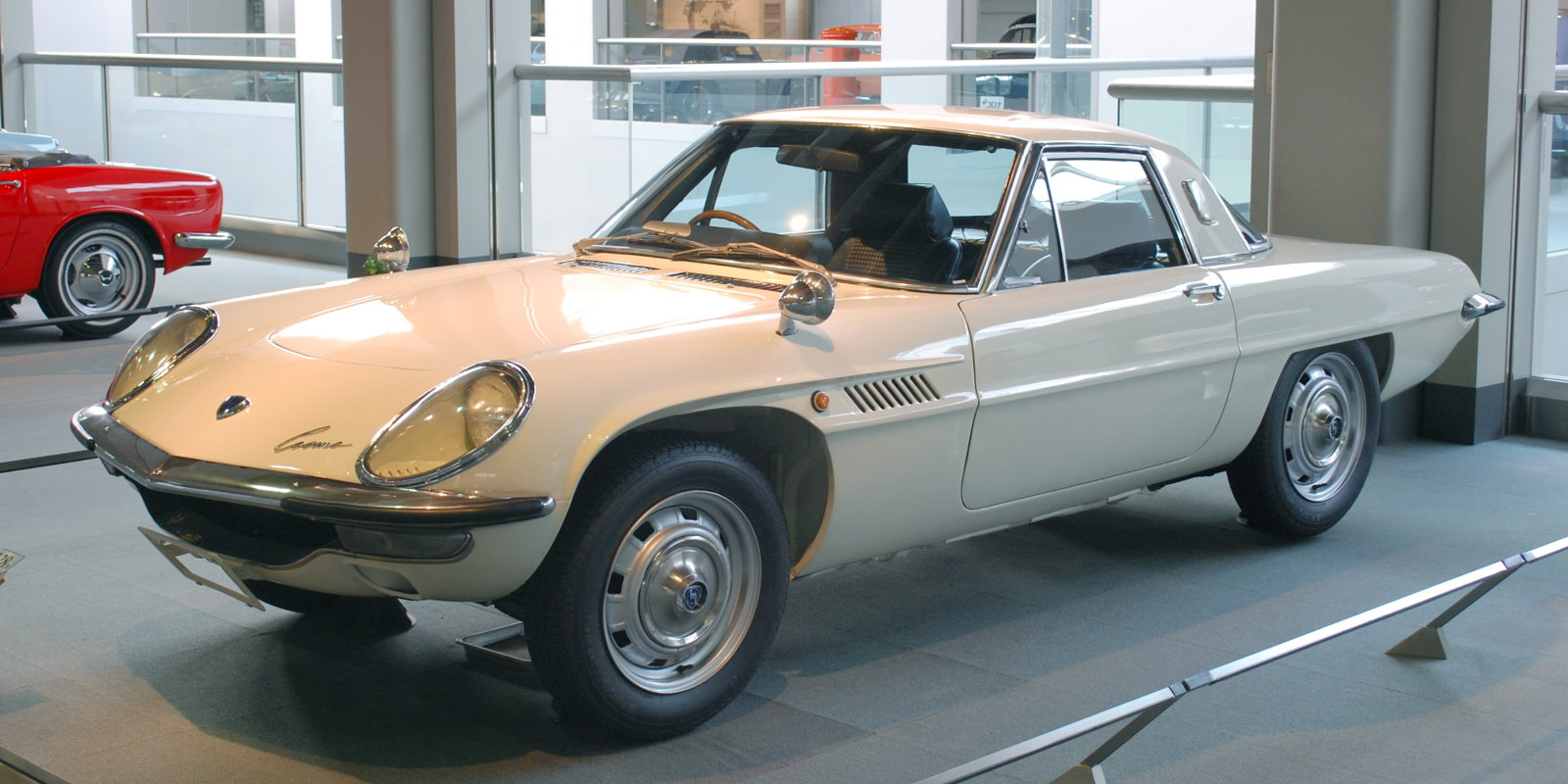
- 1968 Mazda Cosmo L10B

Overview
- Manufacturer: Mazda
- Production: 1967–1995
- Assembly: Japan: Hiroshima (Hiroshima Assembly)

Body and chassis
- Class: Sports car (1967–1981); Mid-size car (1981–1989); Grand tourer (1990–1995)
- Layout: Front-engine, rear-wheel-drive

The Mazda Cosmo (マツダ・コスモ, Matsuda Kosumo) is an automobile produced by Mazda from 1967 to 1995. During its production run, the Cosmo served as a "halo" vehicle for Mazda, with the first Cosmo successfully launching the Mazda Wankel engine. The final generation of the Cosmo served as Mazda's flagship vehicle in Japan, sold as the Eunos Cosmo through its luxury Eunos division in Japan.

Mazda decided on the name "cosmo", reflecting international cultural fascination with the Space Race. The company wanted to showcase the Mazda Wankel engine as forward-thinking, with focus on future developments and technology.

== Series L10A/L10B (1967–1972) ==
Series L10A/L10B
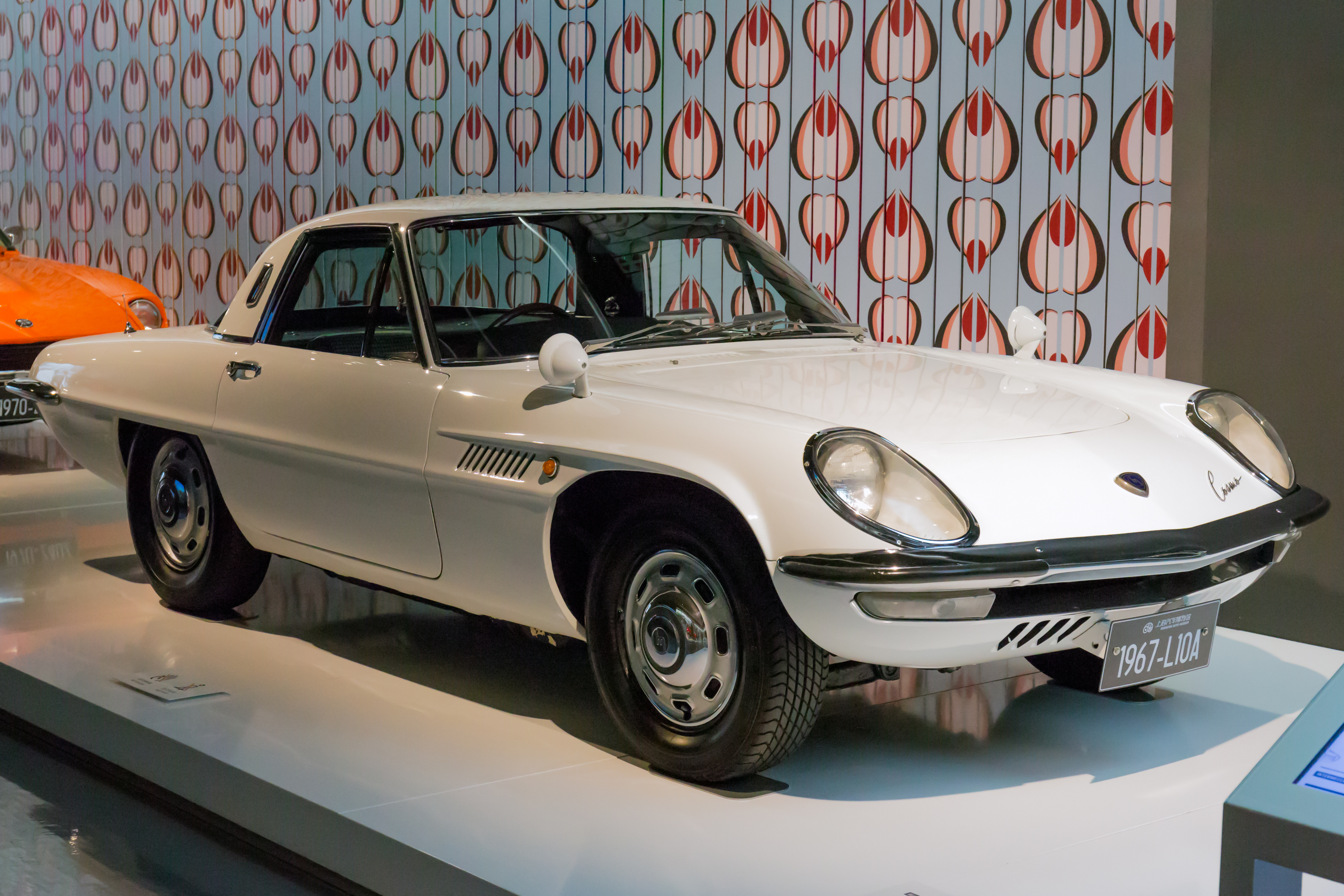
- 1967 Mazda Cosmo L10A (Series I)

Overview
- Production: 1967–1972
- Designer: Heiji Kobayashi; Kenichi Yamamoto

Body and chassis
- Body style: 2-door coupé

Powertrain
- Engine: 982 cc 0810 (Series I); 982 cc 0813 (Series II)
- Transmission: 4-speed manual; 5-speed manual

Dimensions
- Wheelbase: Series I: 2,200 mm (86.6 in); Series II: 2,350 mm (92.5 in)
- Length: 4,140 mm (163.0 in)
- Width: 1,595 mm (62.8 in)
- Height: 1,165 mm (45.9 in)
- Curb weight: 940 kg (2,072.3 lb)

The first Mazda to bear the Cosmo name (called the 110S on models intended for export) was (along with the NSU Ro80) one of the first production cars to feature a 2-rotor Wankel engine. A prototype was presented at the 1964 Tokyo Motor Show, one month before the 1964 Summer Olympics, and after the introduction of the NSU Spider at the Frankfurt Motor Show; 80 pre-production Cosmos were produced for the Mazda test department (20) and for dealership testing (60) between 1965 and 1966. Full production began in May 1967 and lasted through 1972, though Cosmos were hand-built at a rate of approximately one per day, for a total of 1,176 (343 Series I cars and 833 Series II cars). The car was also featured in the show The Return of Ultraman.

Cosmos were built in five batches:

Date	Number	Engine	Description
1963	2	8A	prototype Cosmo
1964	1	10A	Tokyo Motor Show prototype
January 1965	80	0810	preproduction test cars
May 1967 – July 1968	343	0810	Series I
July 1968 – September 1972	833	0813	Series II

=== Racing ===
In 1968, Mazda went racing with the Cosmo. They selected one of the most grueling tests in Europe to prove the reliability of the rotary engine, the 84-hour Marathon de la Route at the legendary Nürburgring circuit in Germany. Two mostly stock Cosmos were entered, along with 58 other cars. One major change to the cars' 10A engines was the addition of a novel side- and peripheral-port intake system: A butterfly valve switched from the side to the peripheral port as RPM increased. The engines were limited to 130 PS (96 kW) to improve durability.

The cars ran together in fourth and fifth place for most of the race, but the all-Japanese car was retired with axle damage in the 82nd hour. The other car, driven by Belgians, completed the race in fourth overall. This was to be the only racing outing for the Cosmo—the next Mazda race car would be a Familia Rotary (R100).

=== Series I ===
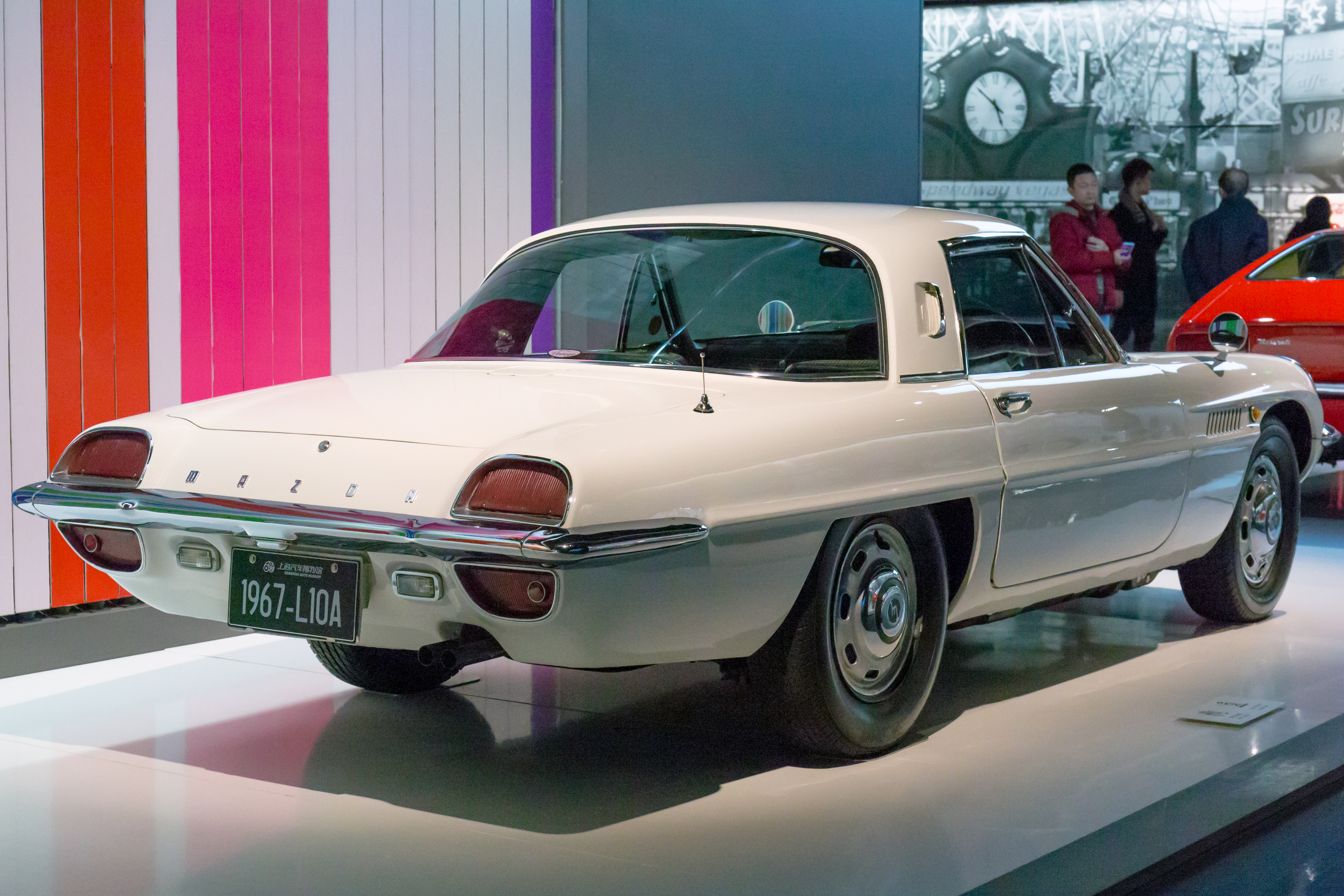
1967 Mazda Cosmo L10A (Series I) rear view

The Series I/L10A Cosmo was powered by a 0810 two-rotor engine with 982 cc of displacement and produced about 110 hp (thus the 110S name used in export markets). It used a Hitachi four-barrel carburetor and an odd ignition design—two spark plugs per chamber with dual distributors. A four-speed manual transmission and 14-inch wheels were standard.

In Japan, the installation of a rotary engine gave Japanese buyers a financial advantage when it came time to pay the annual road tax in that they bought a car that was more powerful than a traditional inline engine, but without having the penalty for having an engine in the higher above-one-litre tax bracket.

The front suspension was a coil-sprung double wishbone design with an anti-roll bar. The rear used a leaf-sprung de Dion tube. Unassisted 10 inch (254 mm) disk brakes were found in front with 7.9 inches (201 mm) drum brakes in the rear. Performance in the quarter-mile (400 m) was 16.4 s, with a 115 mph (185 km/h) top speed. The price was lower than the Toyota 2000GT at 1.48 million yen (US$4,100).

=== Series II ===
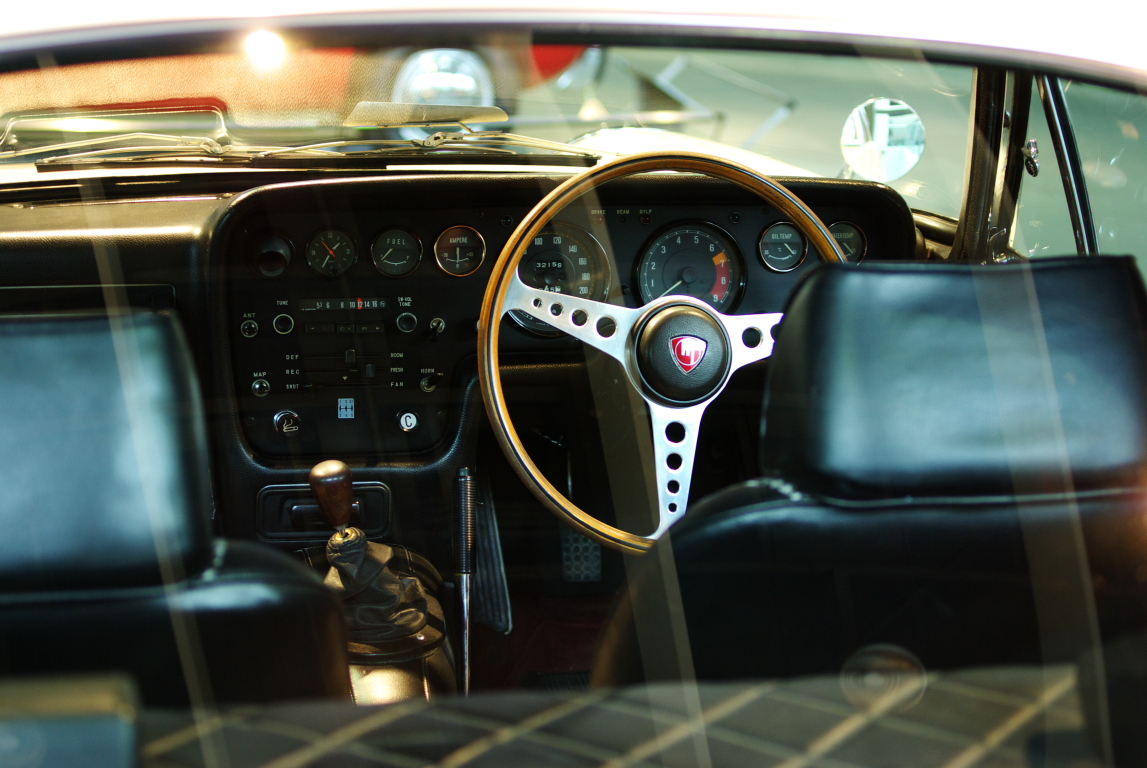
Series II L10B interior

The Series II/L10B was introduced in July 1968. It had a more-powerful 128 hp (95 kW)/103 lb·ft (140 N·m) 0813 engine, power brakes, 15 inch wheels and a 5-speed manual transmission. The wheelbase had been expanded by 15 cm for more room and a better ride. This Cosmo was good for over 120 mph (193 km/h) and could accelerate to cover a quarter-mile (400 m) in 15.8 s.

Visual changes included a larger grille under the front bumper with two additional vents to each side of this "mouth". Only 833 were ever made, and fewer than six Series II models were initially imported into the United States. The price was up a bit to 1.48 million yen (US$4,390).

Comedian and former talk show host Jay Leno owns a 1970 Series II Cosmo which was featured on the North American Speed Channel series My Classic Car in March 2006. It was believed to be the only remaining Series II Cosmo in the United States, though the original Cosmo 10A engine has been replaced with a 12A from an RX-7.

However, Mazda's U.S. division "found another in the garage of Phoenix-area car collector Glenn Roberts and made an offer that he couldn't refuse," according to Car and Driver magazine's September 2007 issue ("A Tale of Two Rotaries"). There is a further Series II Cosmo in a collection in Alberta, Canada.

A 1970 Mazda Cosmo Sport Series II L10B Coupe sold in January 2015 for US$110,000 inclusive premium at auction at Bonhams.

A 1970 Cosmo sports is currently, (September 2024), being fully restored by an English based Company called Yorkshire Car Restorations on YouTube. It has the original Wankel engine (10A) and original 5-speed gearbox. It has been fully stripped to bare metal and new re-fabricated parts and panels fitted, where necessary.

== Series CD (1975–1981) ==
Series CD
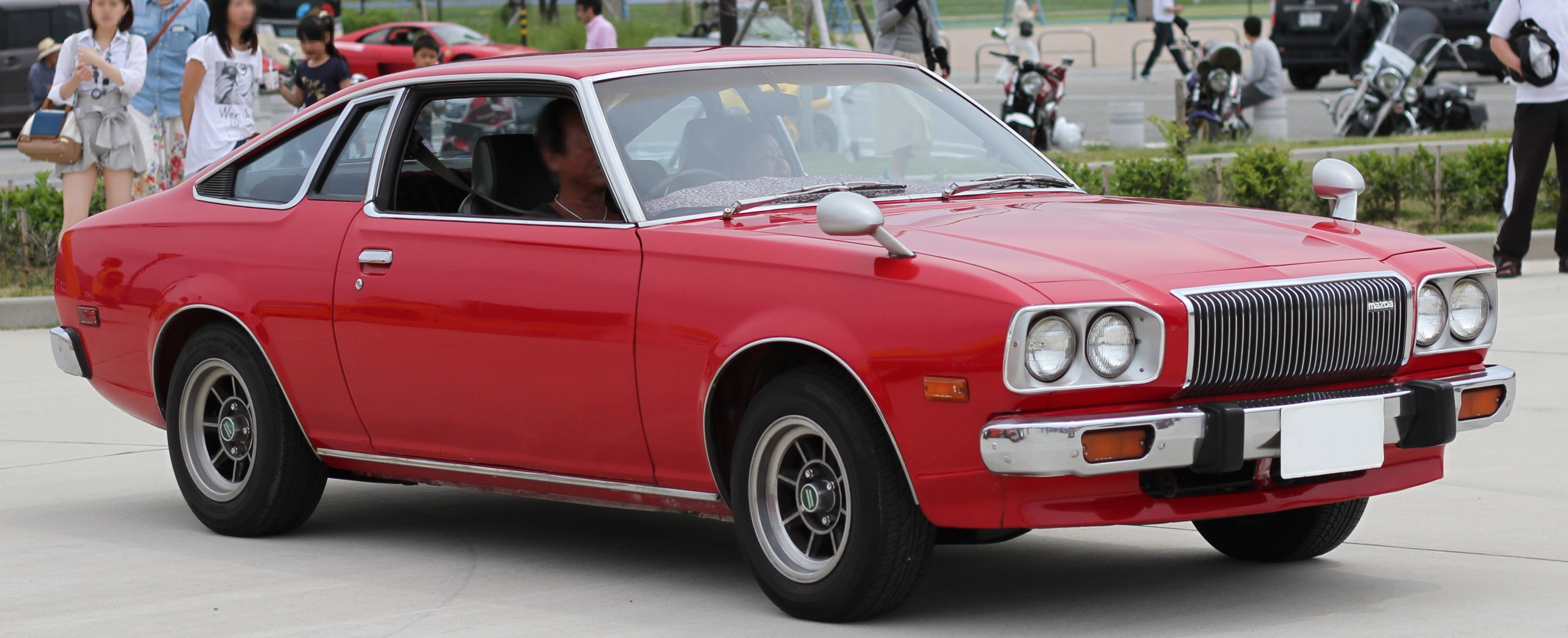
- Mazda Cosmo AP fastback

Overview
- Also called: Mazda RX-5; Mazda 121
- Production: 1975–1981

Body and chassis
- Body style: 2-door coupé; 2-door fastback
- Related: Mazda Luce

Powertrain
- Engine: 1769 cc VC SOHC I4 (CD2V); 1970 cc MA SOHC I4 (CD3M); 1146 cc 12A 2-rotor (CD22); 1308 cc 13B 2-rotor (CD23)

Dimensions
- Wheelbase: 2,510 mm (98.8 in)
- Length: 4,475–4,545 mm (176.2–178.9 in)
- Width: 1,685 mm (66.3 in)
- Height: 1,325 mm (52.2 in)
- Curb weight: 2,469 lb (1,120 kg)

Chronology
- Successor: Mazda 121 (DA)

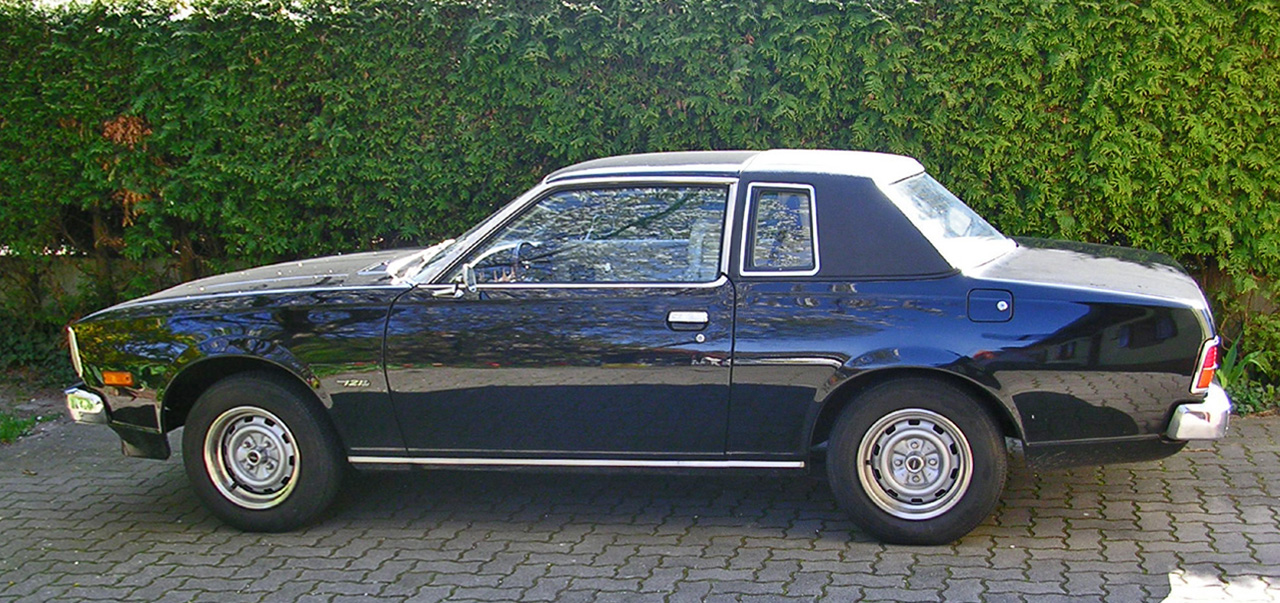
Mazda 121 L Landau coupé

The second generation CD Cosmo appeared in 1975 and lasted until 1981. It was known as the Cosmo AP (Anti-Pollution) in Japan, and sold internationally as the Mazda RX-5, though in some export markets its piston-powered counterpart was called the Mazda 121 (a name later applied to Mazda's subcompact model). The anti-pollution label reflected that the cars were able to meet the strict, 1976 Japanese emissions standards, thanks to the installation of a thermal reactor which kept hydrocarbon levels down.

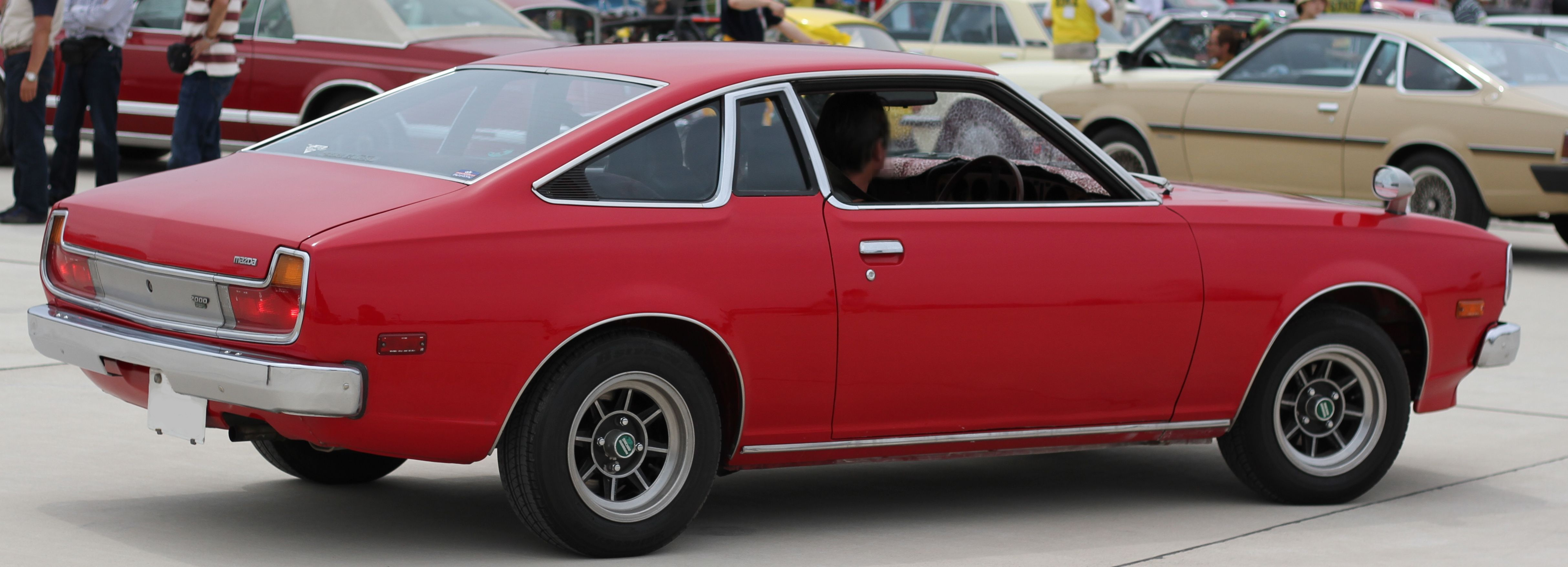
Mazda Cosmo AP fastback rear view

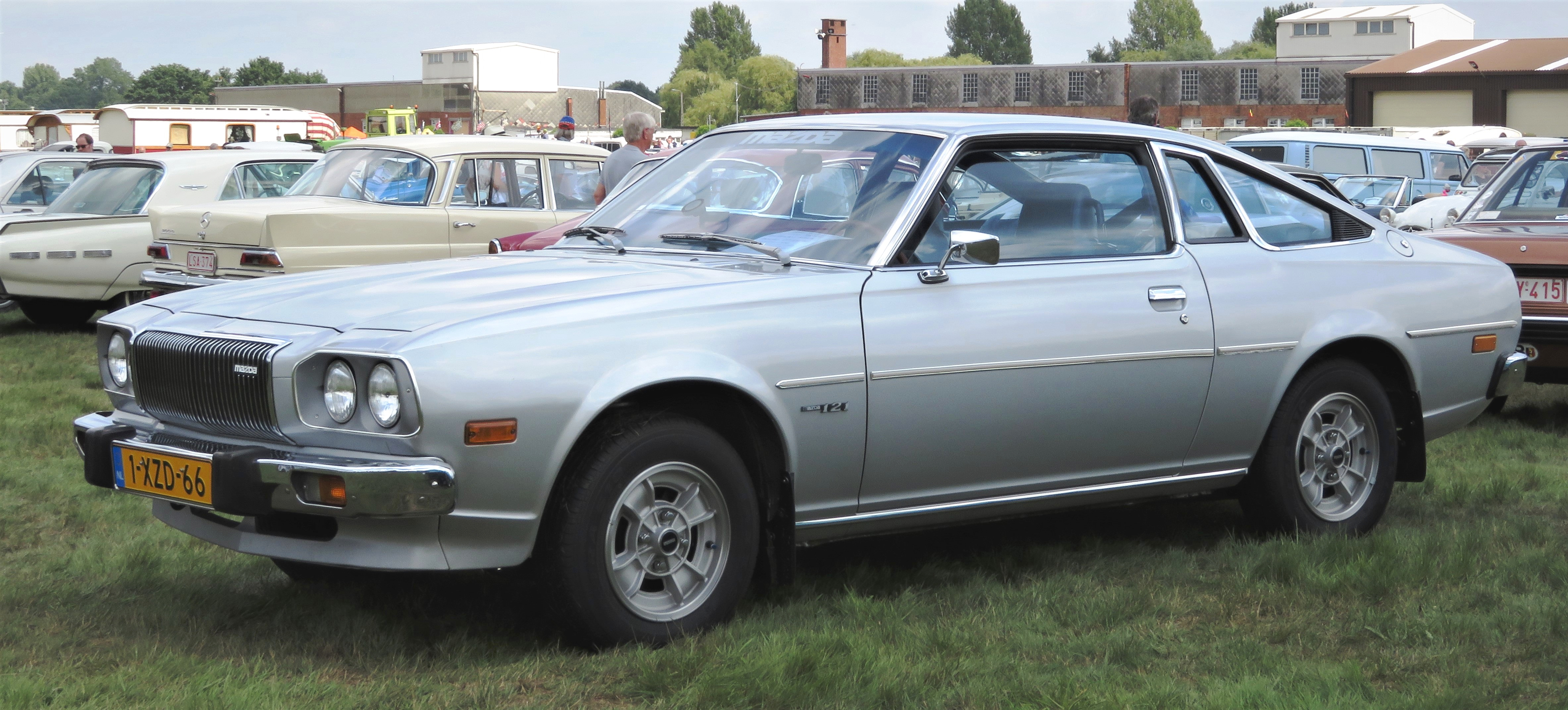
Mazda 121 fastback

The CD Cosmo/RX-5 series was positioned as a personal luxury car, with a focus on comfort and high equipment levels rather than outright sportiness. When introduced, it had a fastback bodystyle with three side windows; the one just behind the B-pillar could be wound down. Inspired by the US market, in particular the 1970s era Lincoln Continental, a notchback coupé model called the Landau appeared in early 1977. Called the Cosmo L in Japan, it included an opera window and padded vinyl roof covering. Neither body style found many international buyers; it was, however, an enormous success in Japan where over 55,000 were sold in the first year alone and effectively saved Mazda from financial disaster. This new model competed with the Toyota Crown, Nissan Cedric, Nissan Gloria, and the Mitsubishi Galant Lambda coupés newly introduced to Japan. Whilst the series-1 (75-78) was exported, the series-2 (79-81) was a JDM only.

Mazda America used the Cosmo name and offered it from 1976 through 1978, fitted with the 13B rotary engine. In the United States, the Cosmo was replaced by the smaller, lighter, and sportier Mazda RX-7. Due to its poor sales as an export, the Series II version, built from 1979, was not exported and remained a Japanese domestic sale only. In Europe, the RX-5 saw very little competition in the rotary-engine equipped market, with the introduction of the short-lived Citroën GS Birotor, as well as any remaining NSU RO80 sedans.

The Cosmo was Mazda's largest rotary-powered coupé, based on the LA series Mazda Luce floor pan and mechanics, but slightly heavier due to body design and more luxurious appointments, including a five-link rear suspension and rear disc brakes. It was available with the 12A and 13B engines. This series Cosmo was joined by the short-lived Mazda Roadpacer, a large, heavy sedan powered only by a rotary engine.

While the powerful rotaries received most of the attention, with the 13B-engined version with a manual transmission being able to reach a top speed of 195 km/h (121 mph), a piston-engined version was also on offer at the bottom of the range. The Cosmo 1800, used a 1769 cc (80 × 88 mm) inline-four SOHC engine that produces 100 PS (73.5 kW) and 110 lb⋅ft (149 N⋅m). After Mazda noted a space for a more powerful piston-engined derivative, as rotary sales were slowing down because of their high fuel consumption, the bigger Cosmo 2000 with 110 PS (81 kW) became available in March 1977.

The rotary engine had financial advantages to Japanese consumers in that the engine displacement remained below 1.5 liters, a significant determination when paying the Japanese annual road tax which kept the obligation affordable to most buyers, while having more power than traditional piston engines of the same official displacement.

== Series HB (1981–1989) ==
Series HB
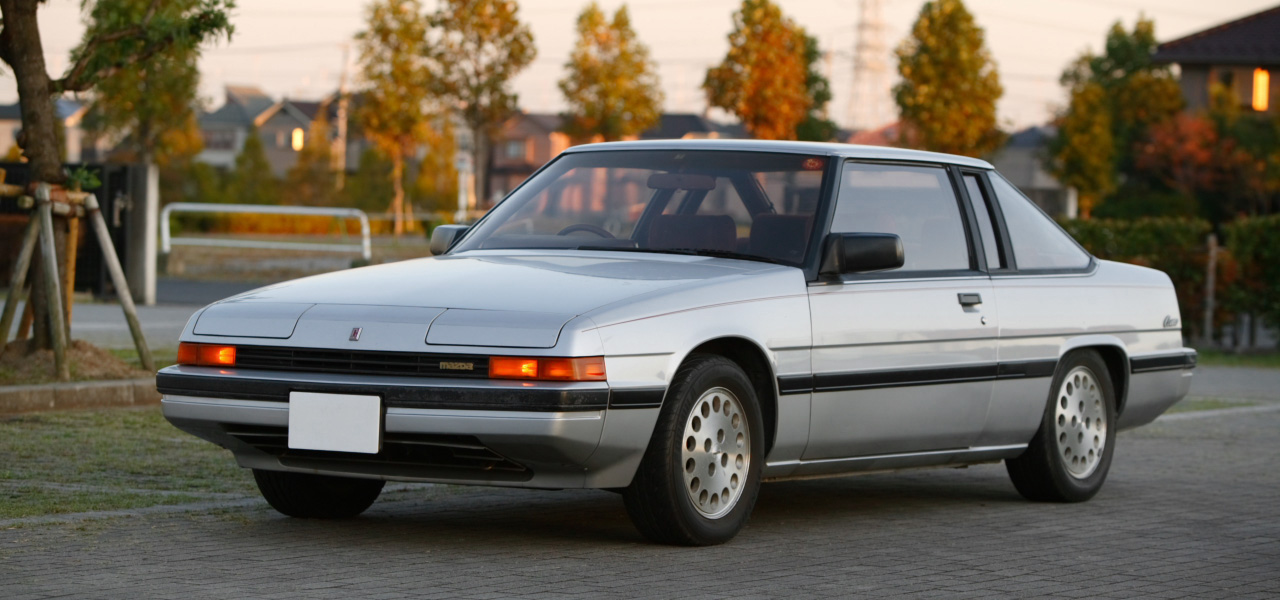
- First series Cosmo coupé

Overview
- Also called: Mazda 929 (1982–1986)
- Production: 1981–1989

Body and chassis
- Body style: 2-door coupé; 4-door hardtop sedan; 4-door sedan
- Related: Mazda Luce

Powertrain
- Engine: 1.8 L VC SOHC I4; 2.0 L MA SOHC I4; 2.0 L FE SOHC I4; 1.1 L 12A; 1.1 L 12A Turbo; 1.3 L 13B-RESI; 2.2 L S2 diesel I4

Dimensions
- Wheelbase: 2,615 mm (103 in)
- Length: 4,640 mm (183 in)
- Width: 1,690 mm (67 in)
- Height: 1,340 mm (53 in)
- Curb weight: 1,135 kg (2,502 lb)

The third generation HB Cosmo from September 1981 shared the Mazda HB chassis with its twin, the Mazda Luce. Some versions of both HB cars were sold overseas as the Mazda 929. The HB Cosmo was offered as a coupé (also called two door hardtop), as a sleek frameless window sedan (also called four door hardtop), and as a formal pillared sedan (known in Japan as saloon). The HB Cosmo is the 1st of two only cars in automotive history to offer a choice of gasoline and diesel piston engines, or rotary engines, and this was the last generation Cosmo to be exported. The design was smoothed out, rectilinear, with large glass surfaces and had a drag coefficient of Cd=0.32, the lowest in the world at the time of introduction.

Both the Cosmo sedan and four door hardtops were badge engineered versions of their respective Luce counterparts, with the Cosmo models sold at an exclusive dealership called Mazda Auto, while the Luce was sold at previously established Japanese Mazda dealerships. Later in 1991, Mazda Auto locations were renamed Eunos. The two door HB coupé however was only sold in Japan as a Cosmo. The range was facelifted in October 1983, at which time the fuel injected 13B-SI engine was introduced and the four-door hardtop switched from pop-up to fixed headlights. During 1984, the non-GT coupés also switched to fixed headlamps (domestic Japanese market; export markets differ in specifications and badge combinations).

When the FC series Mazda Savanna RX-7 was introduced in 1986 internationally, this series Cosmo coupé retained its top position as Mazda's largest rotary powered personal luxury car, with a comfortable backseat, trunk, and every luxury amenity available, while adopting the retractable headlights from the RX-7.

Mazda offered three different rotary engines for the HB series. These are the 12A-6PI (for "six-port induction"), 12A-turbo, and the 13B-RESI, with the 12AT version being the first fuel injected rotary engine from a late 1982 introduction. The 13B-RESI came online for the series-2 in 1984 and was only available with a JATCO 4-speed automatic transmission. The 1982 12A-turbo Cosmo coupé was officially the fastest production car in Japan until being overtaken by the FJ20ET-powered R30 Skyline RS. Due to durability issues, the turbo did not benefit from the six-port induction used on the naturally aspirated 12A-SPI variant, a system which lowered emissions, sound levels, and fuel consumption while also increasing power.

The rotary engine had financial advantages to Japanese consumers in that the engine displacement remained below 1.5 litres, a significant determination when paying the Japanese annual road tax which kept the obligation affordable to most buyers, while having more power than the traditional inline engines.

The HB Cosmo and Luce names were used in Japan, with the 929 being the export version (which was not available with the rotary engine options). While the HB Luce and Cosmo Saloon were discontinued in 1986, both Cosmo hardtops remained in production at a trickle until 1989.

Mazda Australia toyed with the idea of imported the 12AT powered variant due to the sluggish performance of the 2lt piston engine, instead opting for FE-Turbo EGI (Electronic Gasoline Injection) Luxury was available in Australia from 1986 to May 1987 (with these later cars produced in 1986). It used the FET engine and came only with a manual transmission. Not all two-door 929 models used the FET, most used other variants of the FE engine, either Carburetor or EGI with optional four-speed automatic transmission. The 2.0 L (1998 cc) fuel injected, turbocharged FET version of the FE produced 100 kW (134 hp; 136 PS) and 237 N⋅m (175 lb⋅ft). It was a water-cooled, 8-valve SOHC engine featuring a small turbocharger and no intercooler.

Series I Models for Japan (1981-1983)

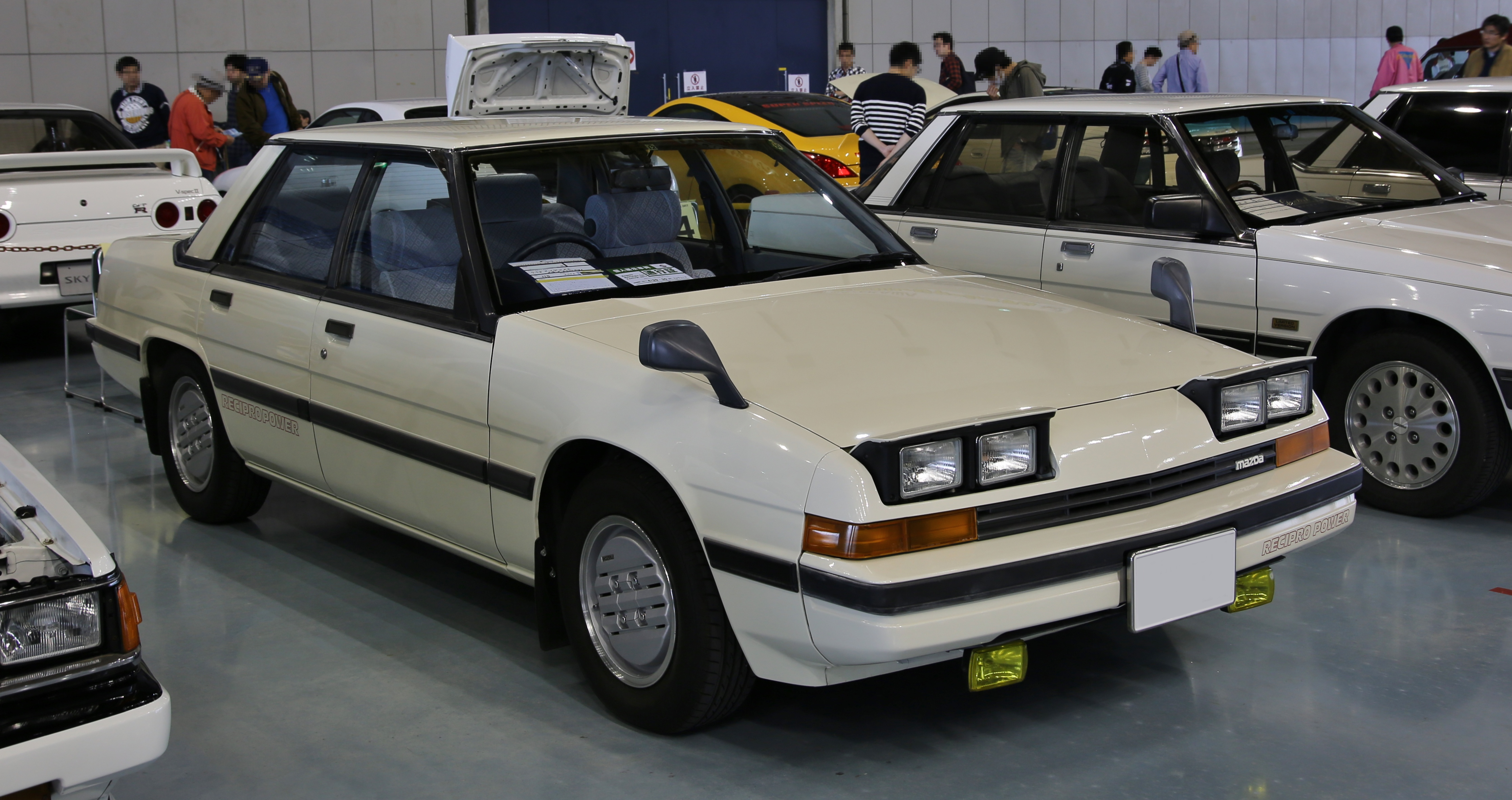
First series Mazda Cosmo 2000 XG-X EGI Hardtop; all first series HB Hardtop and Coupé Cosmos had pop-up headlamps.

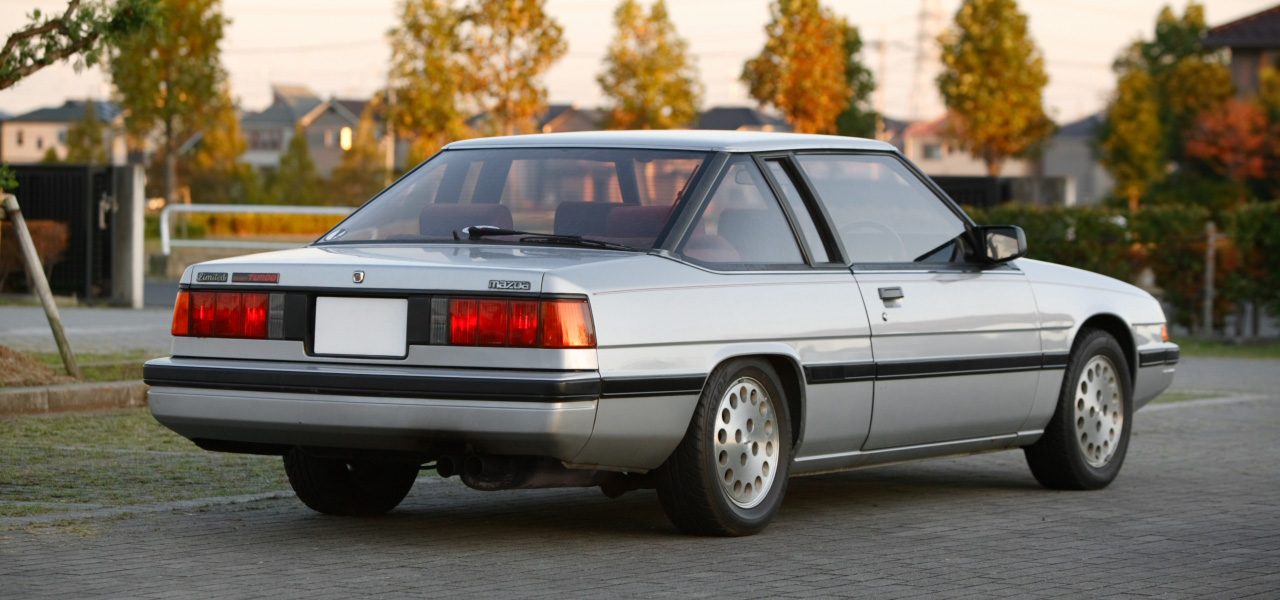
First series Cosmo Limited Rotary Turbo coupé; note the divided rear side windows and vertical indents on the tail lamps

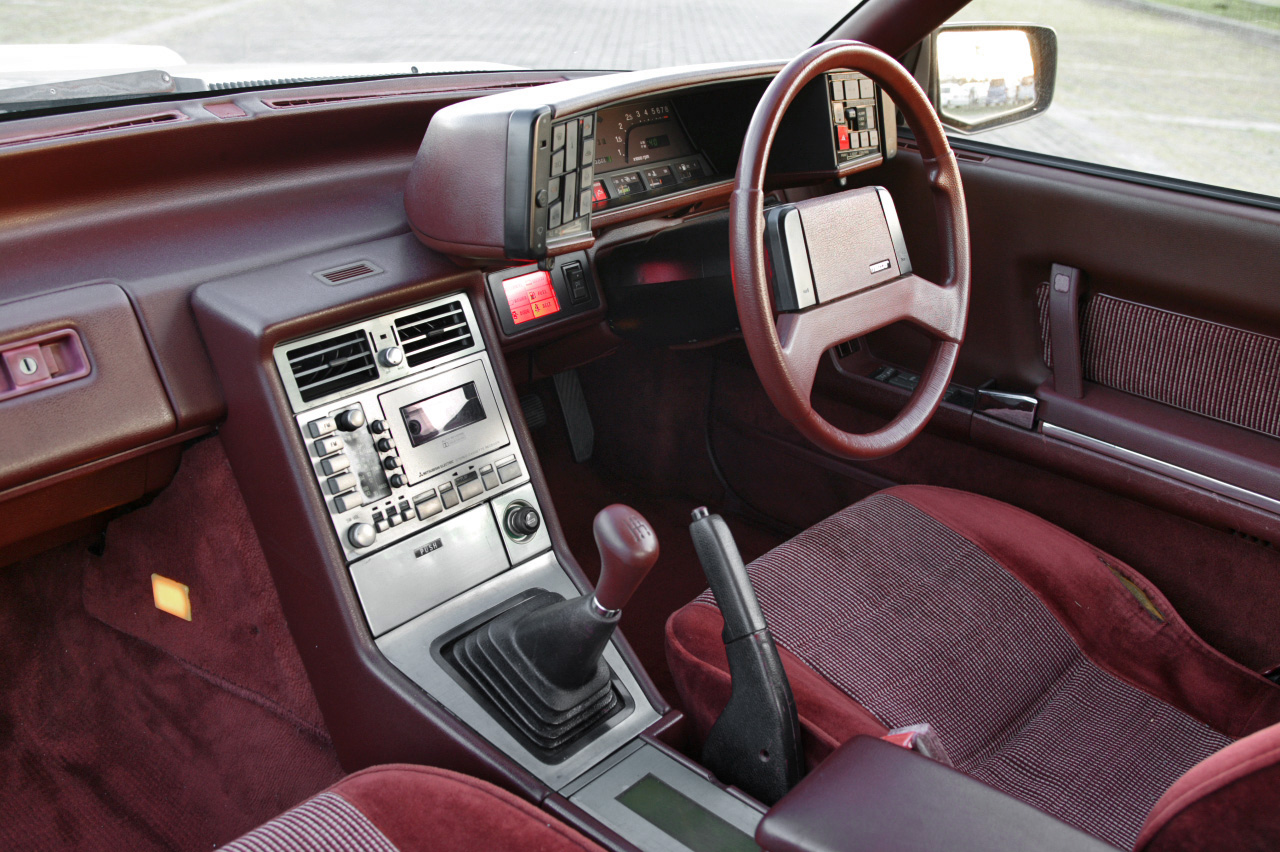
Cosmo two-door coupé interior

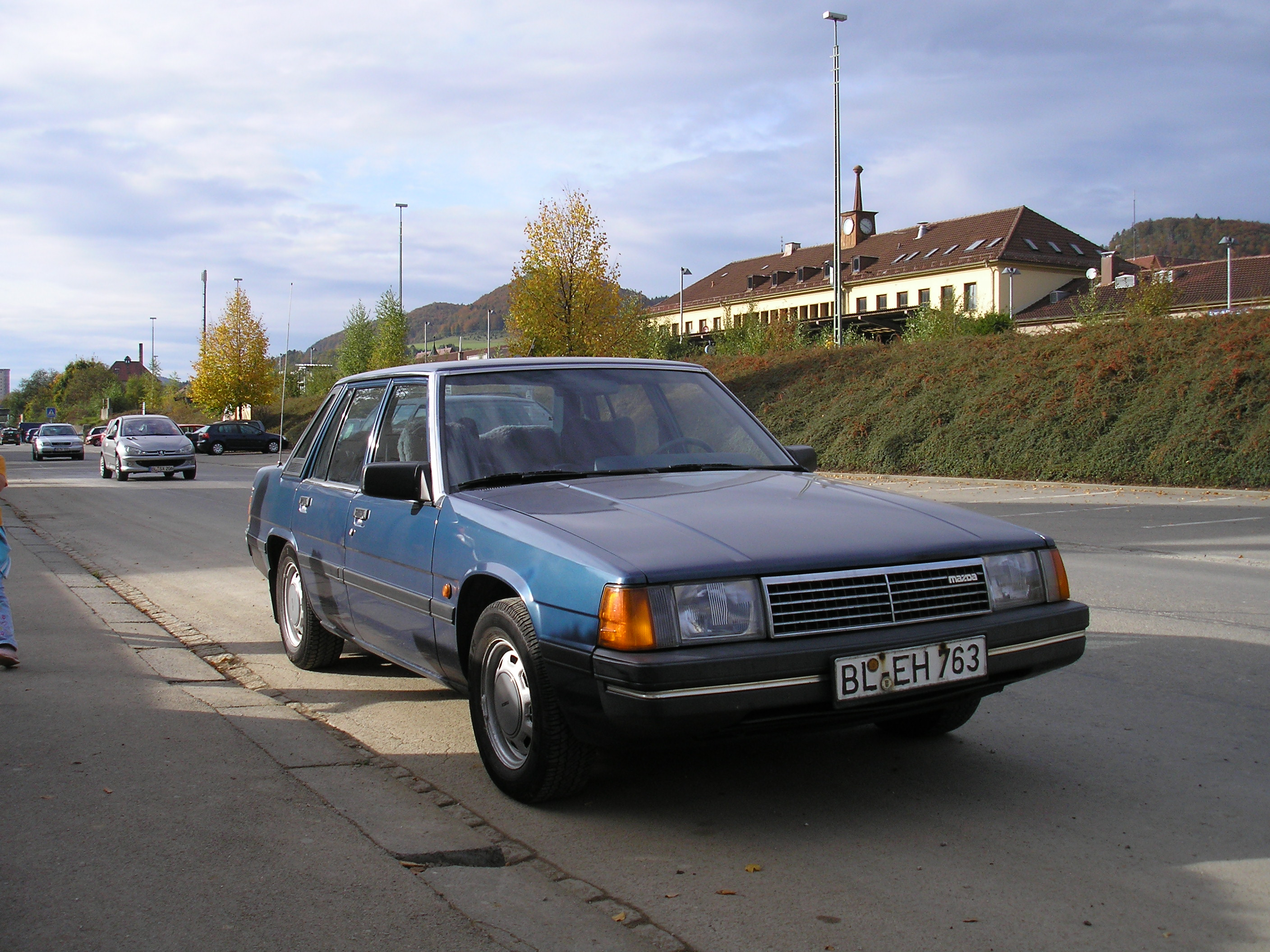
First series Mazda Cosmo Saloon (sold as Mazda 929 saloon overseas), showing narrow headlamps

Coupé and Hardtop:

- Cosmo Rotary GT-X (12A 6PI)
- Cosmo Rotary Limited (12A 6PI)
- Cosmo Rotary Turbo GT (12A Turbo)
- Cosmo Rotary Turbo Limited (12A Turbo)
- Cosmo 2000 XG (MA/F) (Coupé only)
- Cosmo 2000 XG-L (MA/F)
- Cosmo 2000 XG-S (MA/F)
- Cosmo 2000 XG-S EGI (MA/F with Electronic Gasoline Injection)
- Cosmo 2000 XG-X (MA/F)
- Cosmo 2000 XG-X EGI (MA/F with Electronic Gasoline Injection)

Saloon

- Cosmo Rotary GT-X Saloon (12A 6PI)
- Cosmo Rotary Limited Saloon (12A 6PI)
- Cosmo Rotary Turbo Limited Saloon (12A Turbo)
- Cosmo 1800 XG-L Saloon (VC)
- Cosmo 1800 XG-S Saloon (VC)
- Cosmo 2000 XG-S Saloon (MA/F)
- Cosmo 2000 XG-X Saloon (MA/F)
- Cosmo DE2200 XG-S Saloon (S2)
- Cosmo DE2200 XG-X Saloon (S2)

Series II Models for Japan (1983-1989)

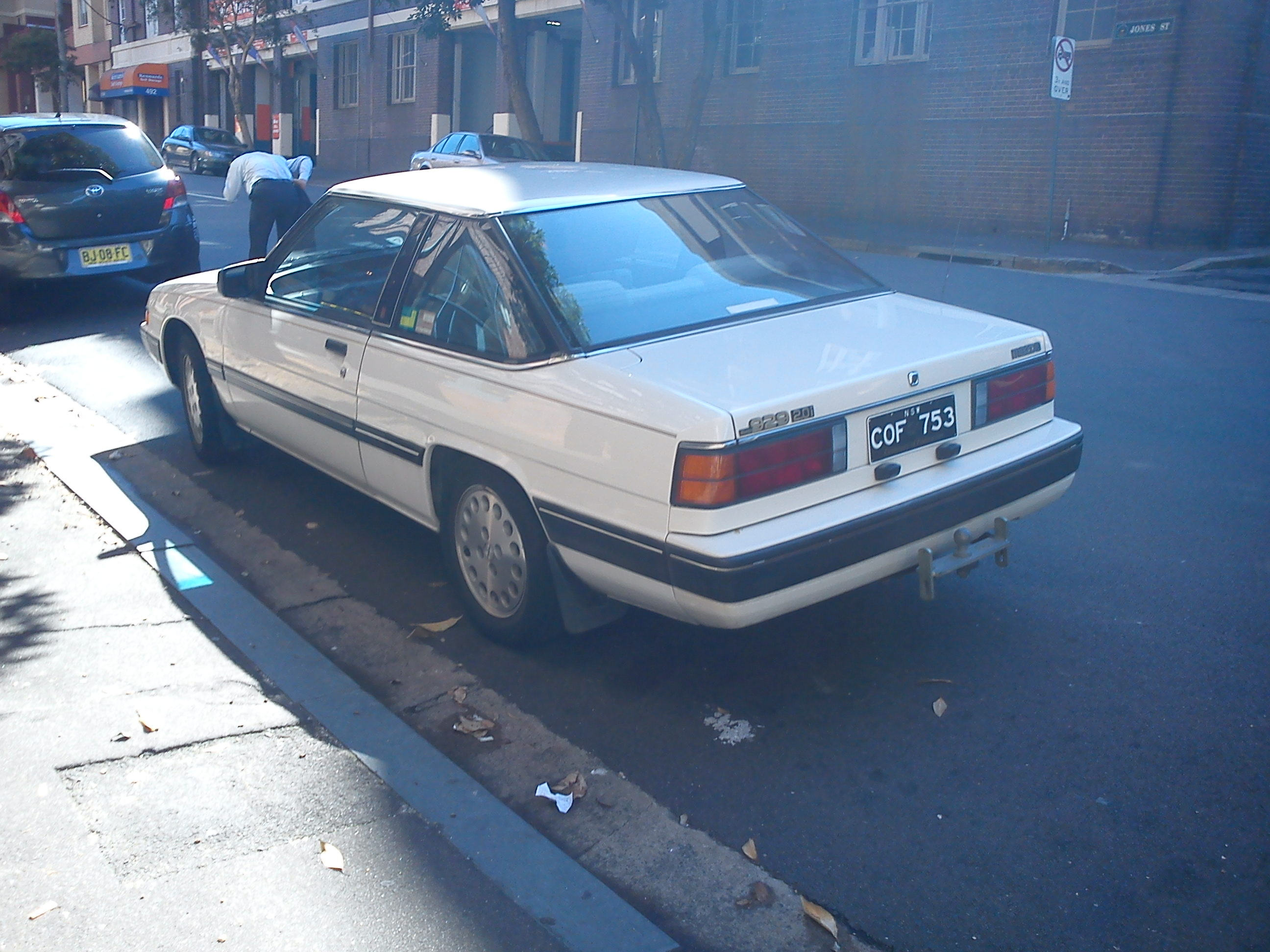
Rear of a second series Mazda 929 Coupé showing the now un-divided rear side windows and the tail lights with horizontal indents

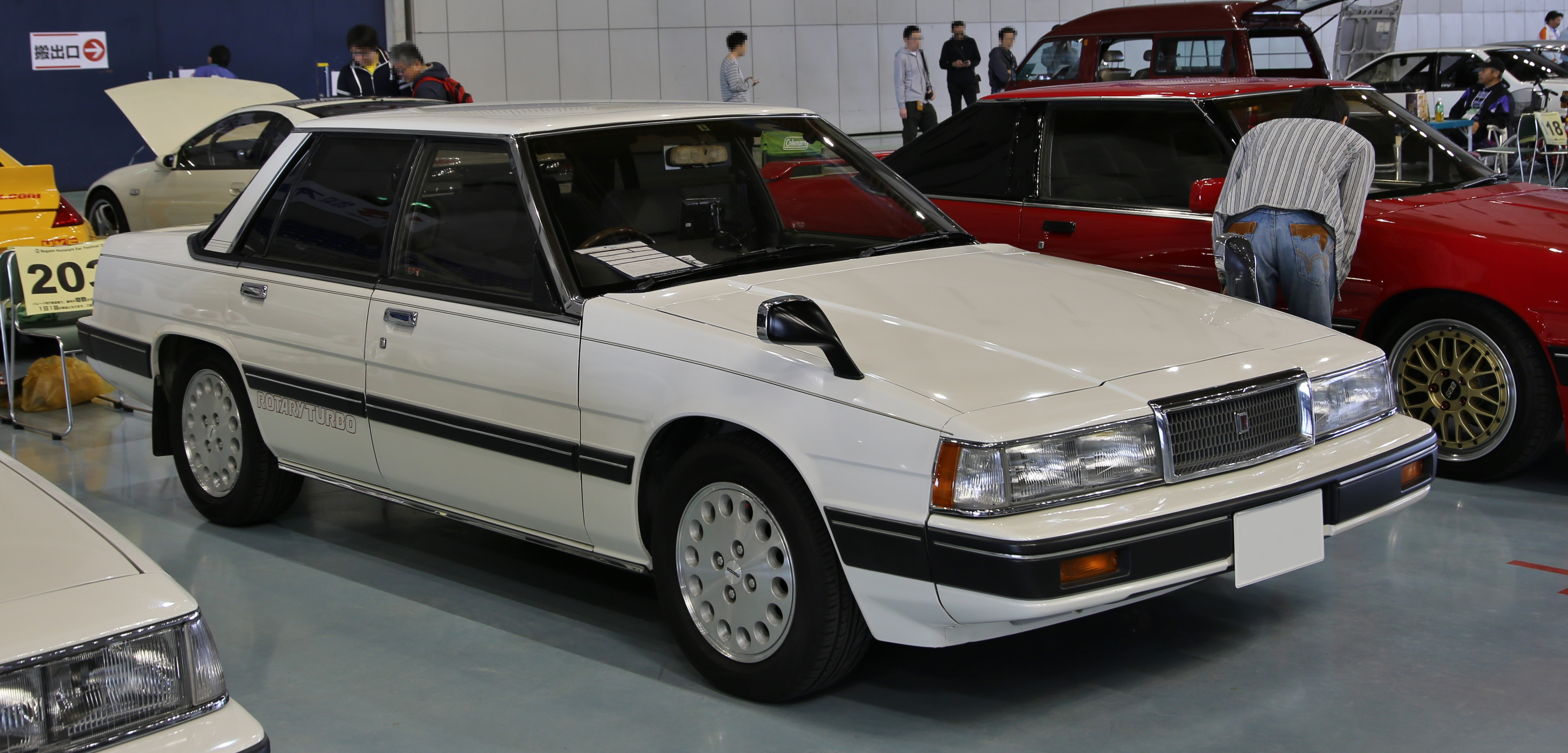
1984 Mazda Cosmo Rotary Turbo Limited Hardtop

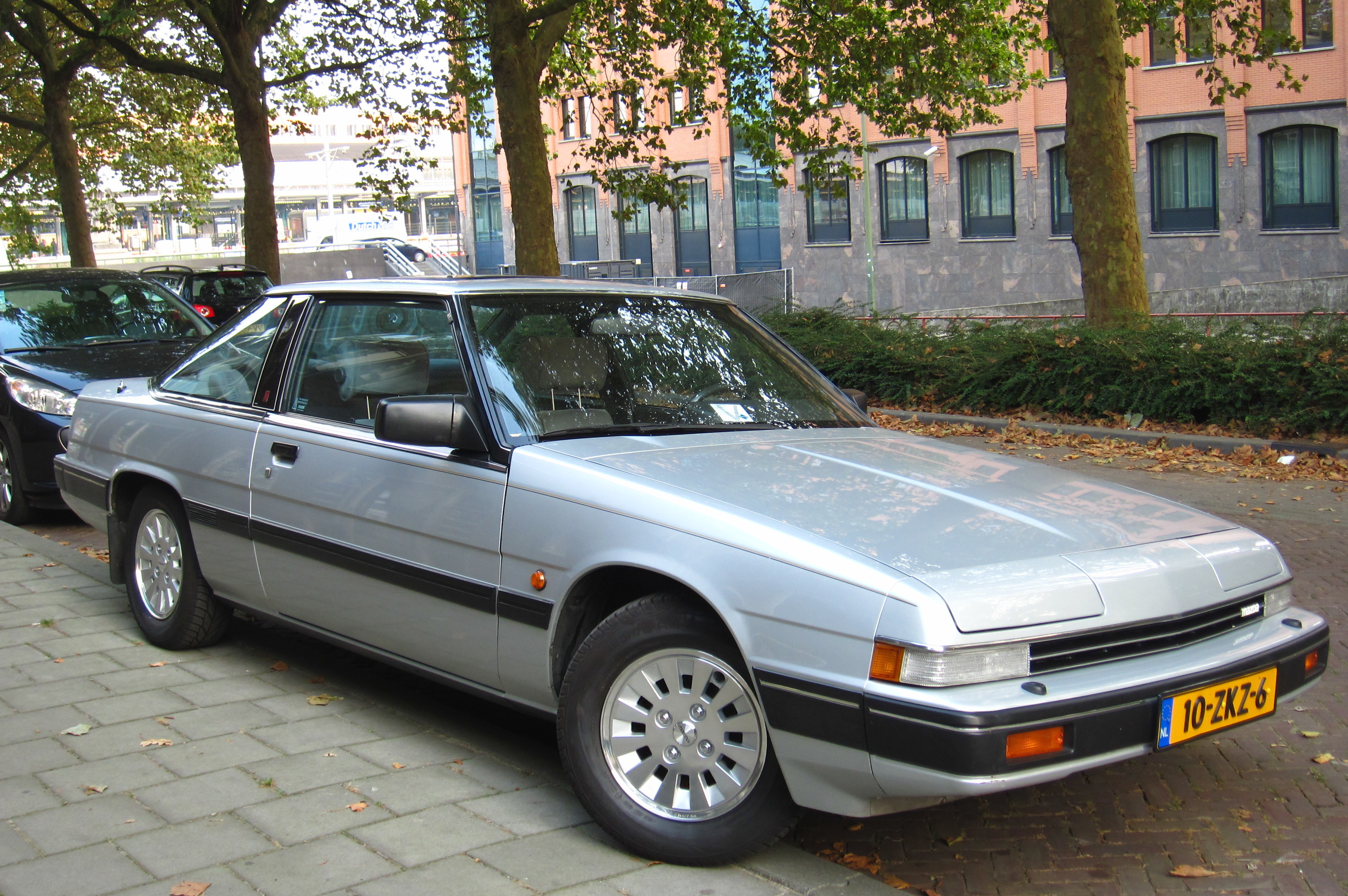
1984 Mazda 929 Coupé (export model; Europe)

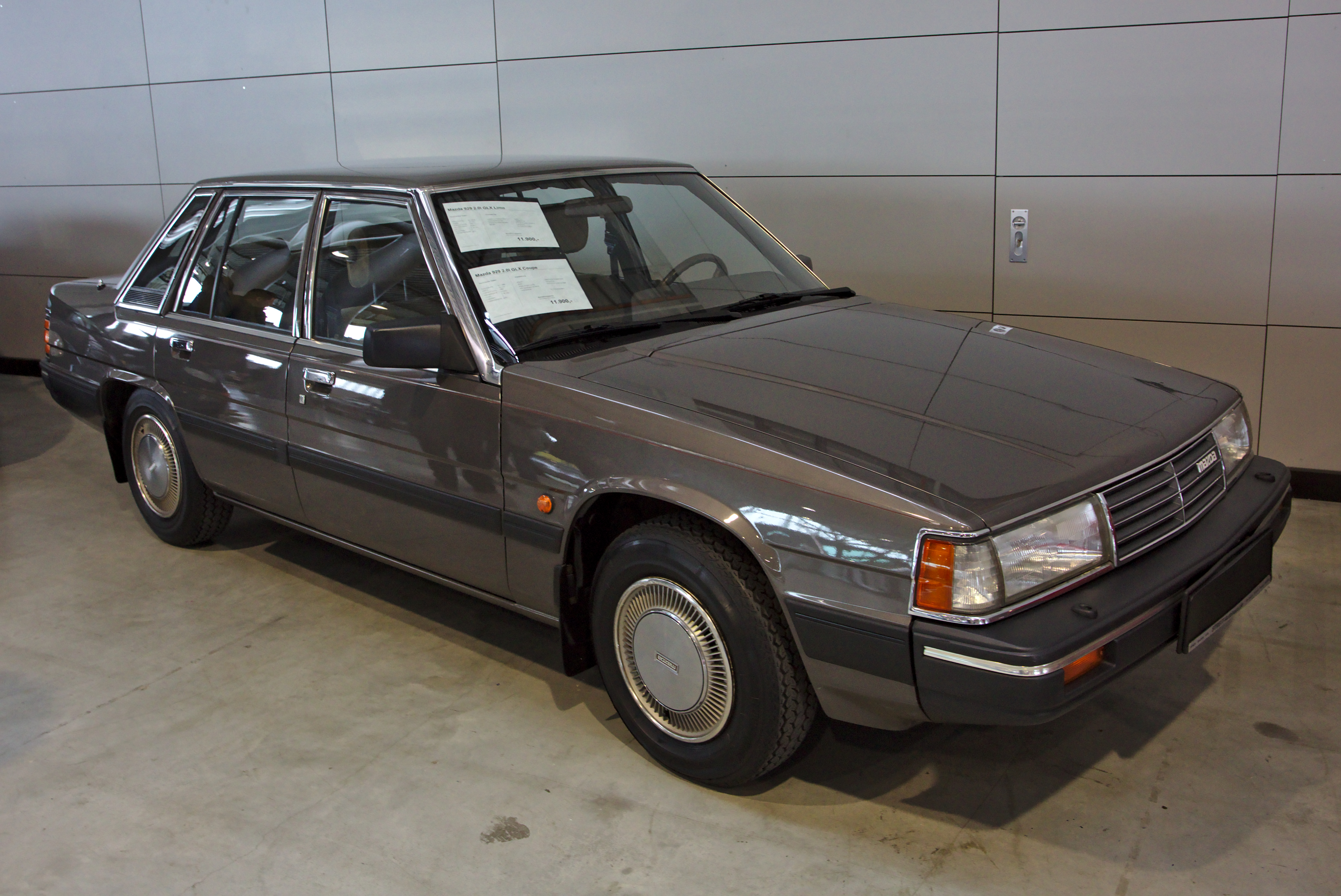
Second series Mazda 929 Saloon showing the re-styled front end with wider headlamps

Coupé and Hardtop:

- Cosmo Rotary 6PI GS-X (12A 6PI) - 1984 only model, sold only with pop-up headlamps
- Cosmo Rotary Turbo GT (12A Turbo) - 1984-1985, sold only with pop-up headlamps for 1984
- Cosmo Rotary Turbo Limited (12A Turbo)
- Cosmo Rotary Super Injection Limited (13B-RESI) - sold from 1983 to 1985
- Cosmo Magnum 2000 XG-X (FE) - 1984 only model
- Cosmo Magnum 2000 XG-X EGI (FE) - 1984 only model
- Cosmo Genteel (FE) - 1985 only model
- Cosmo Genteel-X (FE) - 1985 only model
- Cosmo 2000 Genteel (FE) - sold from 1986 to 1989
- Cosmo 2000 EGI Genteel-X (FE) - sold from 1986 to 1989
- Cosmo 2000 Genteel Limited (FE) - sold from 1986 to 1989
- Cosmo 2000 EGI Genteel-X Limited (FE) - sold from 1986 to 1989

Saloon (1984-1986):

- Cosmo Rotary 6PI GS-X Saloon (12A 6PI) - 1984 only model
- Cosmo Rotary Turbo GT Saloon (12A Turbo)
- Cosmo Rotary Turbo Limited Saloon (12A Turbo)
- Cosmo Rotary Super Injection Limited Saloon (13B-RESI) - sold from 1984 to 1985
- Cosmo Magnum 2000 XG-L Saloon (FE)
- Cosmo Magnum 2000 XG-S Saloon (FE)
- Cosmo Magnum 2000 XG-X Saloon (FE)
- Cosmo Diesel 2200 XG-L Saloon (S2)
- Cosmo Diesel 2200 XG-X Saloon (S2)

== Series JC (Eunos Cosmo, 1990–1995) ==
Series JC
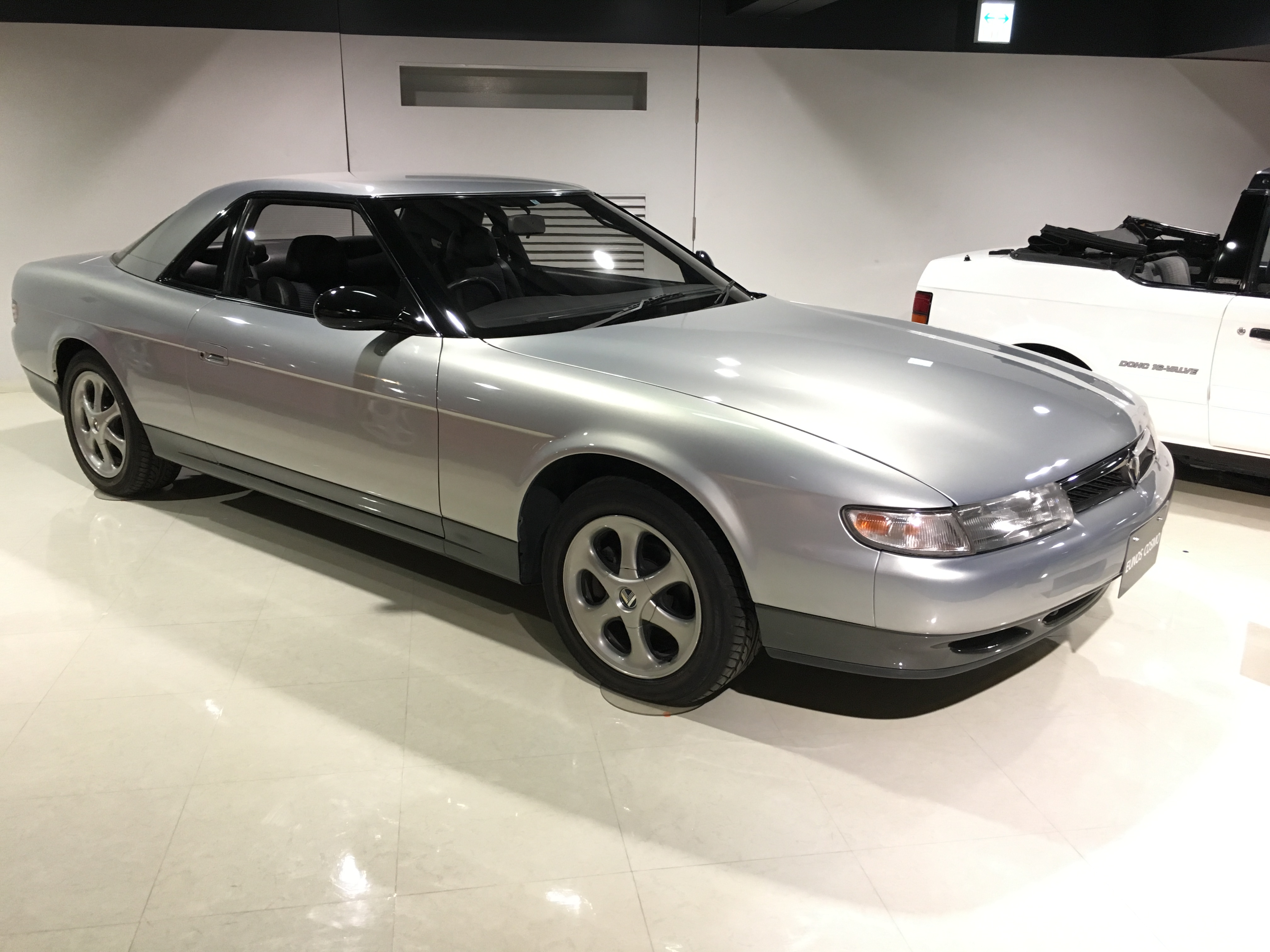

Overview
- Production: 1990–1995

Body and chassis
- Body style: 2-door coupé

Powertrain
- Engine: 1308 cc (654x2) 13B-RE turbo; 1962 cc (654x3) 20B-RE turbo
- Transmission: 4-speed automatic

Dimensions
- Wheelbase: 2,750 mm (108.3 in)
- Length: 4,815 mm (189.6 in)
- Width: 1,795 mm (70.7 in)
- Height: 1,305 mm (51.4 in)
- Curb weight: 1,490–1,640 kg (3,285–3,616 lb)

The Eunos Cosmo (loosely based on the 1985 MX-03 concept car) started production in 1990 on the new JC platform. The Eunos Cosmo was the top-line touring flagship of the Eunos luxury channel. It is the only Mazda to use a triple-rotor engine. The car was a 2+2 coupé and was loaded with power amenities and other luxuries. Following the Japanese luxury theme, only an electronically controlled 4-speed automatic transmission was available that could be placed in manual shift mode and would change the gear selection in the dashboard display from PRNDSL for automatic transmission operation and PRND321 for manual transmission use.

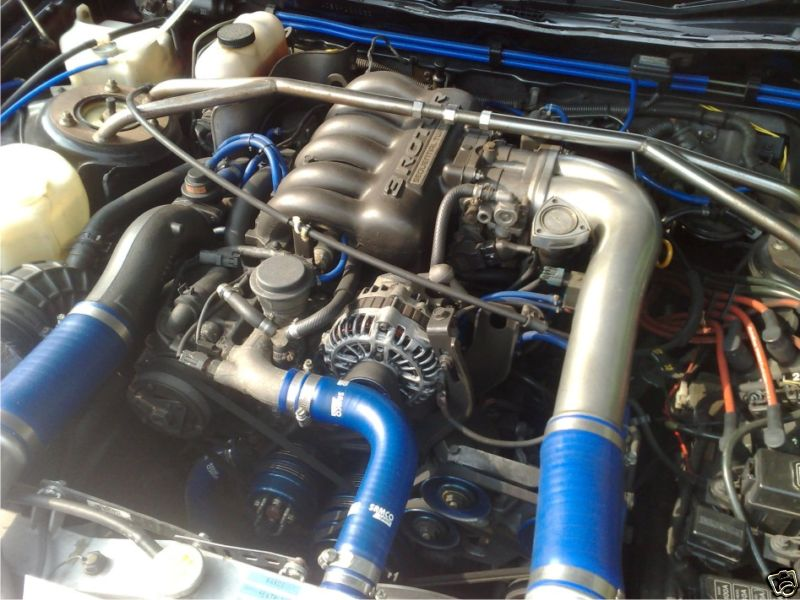
Mazda 20B-RE three rotor engine

Two engines were available, and both were equipped with twin sequential turbochargers; the two-rotor 13B-RE and the three-rotor 20B-RE. The triple rotor 20B-RE had 2 litres (1962 cc) of displacement, making it the largest capacity rotary offered for sale by Mazda. It produces 280 PS (206 kW; 276 hp) and 403 N⋅m (297 lb⋅ft) of torque with twin turbochargers sourced from Hitachi. Two trim packages were offered; the Type-S (Sport) which offered a firm suspension consisting of control arms in the front and a multilink rear suspension, with cloth inserts added to the leather interior and a full length center console accommodating four passengers, or Type-E (Elegant) which offered a softer-tuned suspension and full leather upholstery. The top line spec being the Type-E.CCS (car control system) that incorporated the first JDM Sat-Nav system & touch screen controlled CRT.

The JC series Cosmo set several firsts in automotive history. Its two rotor 13B-RE and three rotor 20B-RE engines were the first Japanese-built, series production twin sequential turbo systems to be offered for sale on any car. The internationally known FD series RX-7 didn't receive it's upgraded twin turbo 13B-REW engine until early 1992. The JC-series 13B-RE used a HT-10 + HT-12 combo compared to the FD series 13B-REW using a HT-12 + HT-12 version. The Eunos Cosmo was the first production car to have a built-in GPS navigation system, and the first in Japan to use the "Palmnet" serial data communication system for ECU-to-ECAT operation.

The fourth generation Cosmo was ahead of its time electronically as well by being offered with Car Communication System, a CRT colour touch-screen controlling climate control, mobile phone, GPS car navigation, NTSC TV, radio and CD player. The instrumentation used LCD rendering analog gauges with indicator needles that "floated", using vivid colors for various functions.

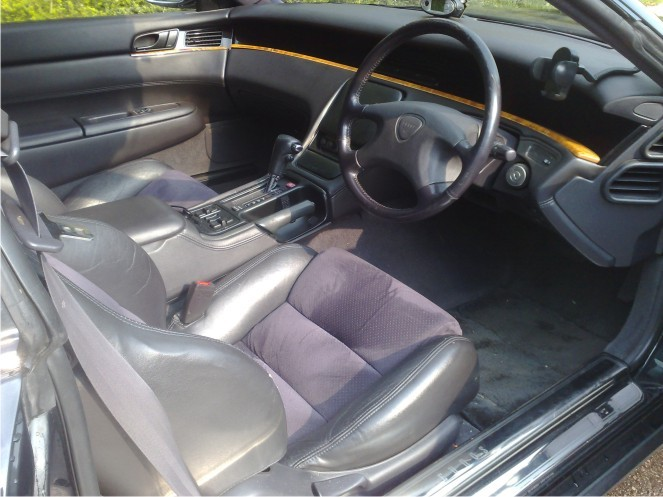
JC Cosmo "Type-SX" interior

The Cosmo was speed limited to 180 km/h (111.8 mph) to suit Japanese regulations, but the 20B-REW version was capable of 255 km/h (158.4 mph) if given a free run. With over 380 N⋅m (280 lb⋅ft) of torque available at just 1,800 rpm, the Cosmo could launch from standstill to freeway speeds quickly; however, this came at the expense of heavy fuel consumption.

The Cosmo was manufactured from February 1990 until September 1995, and gathered a total of 8,875 sales. A split of 60/40 sales between 13B-REW and 20B-REW variants made the triple rotor 20B-REW version a rarer car. Although the Cosmo remained a Japanese market-only vehicle (export had been proposed originally under the Eunos sales channel, and under the stillborn Amati brand in the USA), used Cosmos have found their way to various LHD countries thanks to import regulations for private importers from these countries. The Cosmo appears in Sega GT and in the Gran Turismo and Gran Turismo 2 games, as well as the arcade game series Wangan Midnight: Maximum Tune 1 through 6RR.

Dimensions

- Front Track: 1,520 mm (59.8 in)
- Rear Track: 1,510 mm (59.4 in)

Engines

- JCESE = Series-I (90–93) – 20B
- JCES = Series-II (94–95) – 20B
- JC3SE = Series-I (90–93) – 13B
- JC3S = Series-II (94–95) – 13B

== Cosmo 21 Concept (2002) ==
Cosmo 21
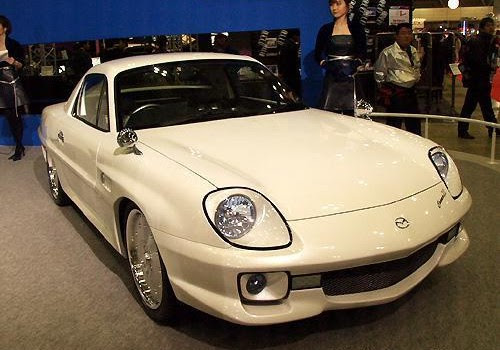
- Mazda Cosmo Concept at the Tokyo Auto Salon (2002)

Overview
- Model years: 2002

Body and chassis
- Body style: 2-door coupé
- Related: Mazda MX-5 (NB)

Powertrain
- Engine: 1.3 L RENESIS twin-rotor
- Power output: 250 PS

At the 2002 Tokyo Auto Salon, Mazda presented the Cosmo 21, a retro styled 21st century reinterpretation of the original Cosmo 110s of 1967 to commemorate the 35th anniversary of the Cosmo.

Based on Mazda's current generation (at the time) of MX-5 (NB), the concept was styled and constructed by Mazda subsidiaries M'z IF (styling) and Mazda Sangyo (construction), and closely resembled the original Cosmo. The engine of the MX-5 was replaced by an early version of the Renesis rotary engine, later found in the Mazda RX-8.

The Cosmo 21 was revealed around the same time as many other retro style cars, including the Volkswagen New Beetle and the New Mini, adding to the growing list of retro style cars being produced in this era. Rumours of the Cosmo 21 entering limited production circulated in Japan, but the car remained purely a concept.
