= Richter Ric Jet 4 =

1970s American experimental aircraft

Ric Jet 4
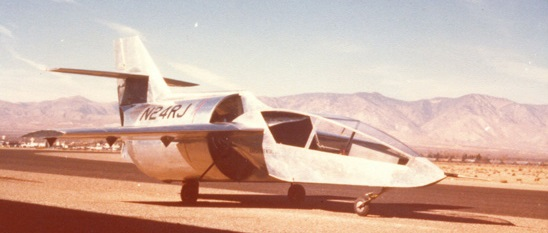
- Front quarter view of the Ric Jet 4

General information
- Type: Experimental aircraft
- National origin: American
- Manufacturer: George Richter
- Number built: 1
- Registration: N24RJ

History
- First flight: 1974

The Richter Ric Jet 4 is an experimental ducted fan monoplane, dating from the early 1970s. It was developed by George Richter of Los Angeles, through his company Ric Jet Systems Research & Development.

== Design and development ==
Richter had conducted research into ducted fan aircraft, building and testing a series of progressively sophisticated flying models. A 1/8th scale model, based on a proposed full scale aircraft, performed so well that it prompted Richter to progress with making the full-sized version of it.

The Ric Jet 4 was a mid-wing monoplane, constructed entirely from pop-riveted aluminum sheets, channels, and tubing. The pilot was located at the front of the fuselage, sitting in a reclined position in a fully enclosed cockpit. Located immediately behind the pilot, and at the aircraft's center of gravity was a Mazda Wankel rotary engine, which powered a two-bladed wooden fan. A cylindrical duct, some 10 ft (3.0 m) long, surrounded the fan. The wings were located just ahead of the intake to the duct, and were set at an anhedral angle and with some sweep back. A cruciform tail was positioned above and to the rear of the duct. The aircraft was equipped with a retractable tricycle undercarriage, though flights were conducted with the wheels being locked down. The wings could be folded upwards, to a vertical position, which enabled the craft to be trailerable.

The Ric Jet 4 incorporated some unusual control features. There were no ailerons, with lateral control being provided by spoilers in the wings' upper surface. There was a split rudder, which allowed for good low-speed directional control.

== Operational history ==
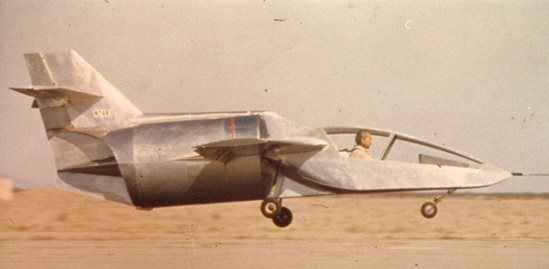
The Ric Jet 4 in flight

Testing of the Ric Jet 4 took place at the Mojave, California airport, and progressed at relatively slow pace, due to budgetary constraints. By the early 1980s, the Ric Jet 4 was reported to have been donated to the Planes of Fame Air Museum at Chino, California.

== Specifications ==
Data from Sport Aviation, Popular Mechanics, and Aerofiles

General characteristics

- Crew: 1
- Length: 22 ft (6.7 m)
- Wingspan: 18 ft (5.5 m)
- Width: 2 ft 1 in (0.64 m) fuselage
- Powerplant: 1 × Mazda Wankel 12A rotary, 130 hp (97 kW)
- Propellers: 2-bladed

Performance

- Maximum speed: 200 mph (320 km/h, 170 kn)

== See also ==
Aircraft of comparable role, configuration, and era

- Bede XBD-2
- RFB/Grumman American Fanliner
- Ligeti Stratos
