= Renesis Player =

RENESIS Player
- Developer: examotion GmbH
- Final release: 1.1.1 / 2008; 18 years ago
- Operating system: Microsoft Windows
- Type: SVG viewer
- License: Proprietary
- Website: Defunct

The RENESIS Player was a SVG viewer and renderer developed by examotion GmbH. The developer's archived website listed version 1.1.1 as the current release in December 2008. The software was distributed for Windows XP and Windows Vista as an Internet Explorer plug-in, a stand-alone viewer, and a Windows Explorer thumbnail extension. A version of the stand-alone viewer was also available for Windows Mobile 6.0.

RENESIS Player supported Internet Explorer 6 and 7 and displayed SVG documents within webpages. The stand-alone could open multiple internet SVGs independent of browser. The Windows shell extension created static thumbnail previews in the Windows Explorer but could not preserve animation.

According to the developers documentation, version 1.1.1 supported GZIP compressed SVGZ files, JavaScript and ECMAScript, CSS 2.1, TrueType and embedded SVG fonts, and embedded JPEG, GIF, and PNG images. IBM listed RENESIS Player 1.1.1 as compatible software for WebSphere Business Monitor 7.0 Feature Pack 1.

According to the official World Wide Web Consortium (W3C) test suite, the RENESIS Player 1.1 had an SVG support score of 58.73% as of March 2009.

In May 2010, the Nuremberg Local Court opened insolvency proceedings against examotion GmbH, and the company was dissolved as a result.
