= Weissach axle =

Automotive rear suspension arrangement

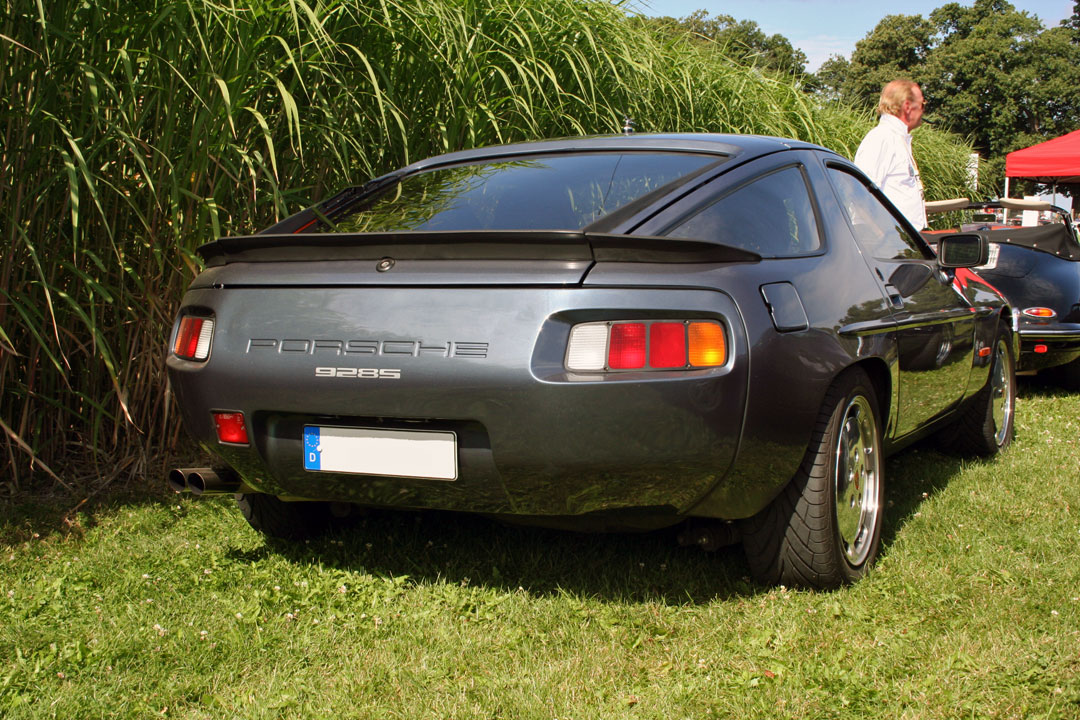
Porsche 928

The Weissach axle is a rear suspension arrangement first used in 1978 in the Porsche 928 and echoed in subsequent production models. The goal of the initial Weissach axle design was to eliminate lift-off oversteer by allowing the rear suspension to adjust itself during cornering manoeuvres and handle both longitudinal and lateral forces. A fully developed version was used in the Porsche 911 (993).

It is named after the town of Weissach (German pronunciation: [ˈvaɪsaːx]), where a Porsche research and development centre is based. "Weissach" is also a backronym for Winkel einstellende, selbst stabilisierende Ausgleichs-Charakteristik meaning angle-adjusting, self-stabilizing equalization characteristic.

== Design ==
The Weissach axle is a variant of the semi-trailing arm suspension design. The tendency of a vehicle to oversteer when decelerating is compounded by the compliant bushings found in most trailing arm suspensions. When the vehicle decelerates, the trailing arms and wheels pivot downwards relative to the chassis. This results in toe out, which makes the vehicle unstable.

In a Weissach axle, the frontmost or outer bushing of each trailing arm is replaced by a short link. When the vehicle decelerates and the trailing arms pivot downwards, the links pull the hubs and cause them to rotate inward slightly; the result is toe in, which adds stability and reduces the risk of oversteer.

== Other manufacturers ==
The rear suspension of the second-generation Mazda RX-7 (FC) uses what Mazda refers to as the Dynamic Tracking Suspension System (DTSS), which also serves to increase stability at higher cornering loads and when braking.

The Lotus Carlton added a toe control link to the semi trailing arm used in the Opel Omega.
