= Mazda RX-7 =

Series of rotary-powered sports cars

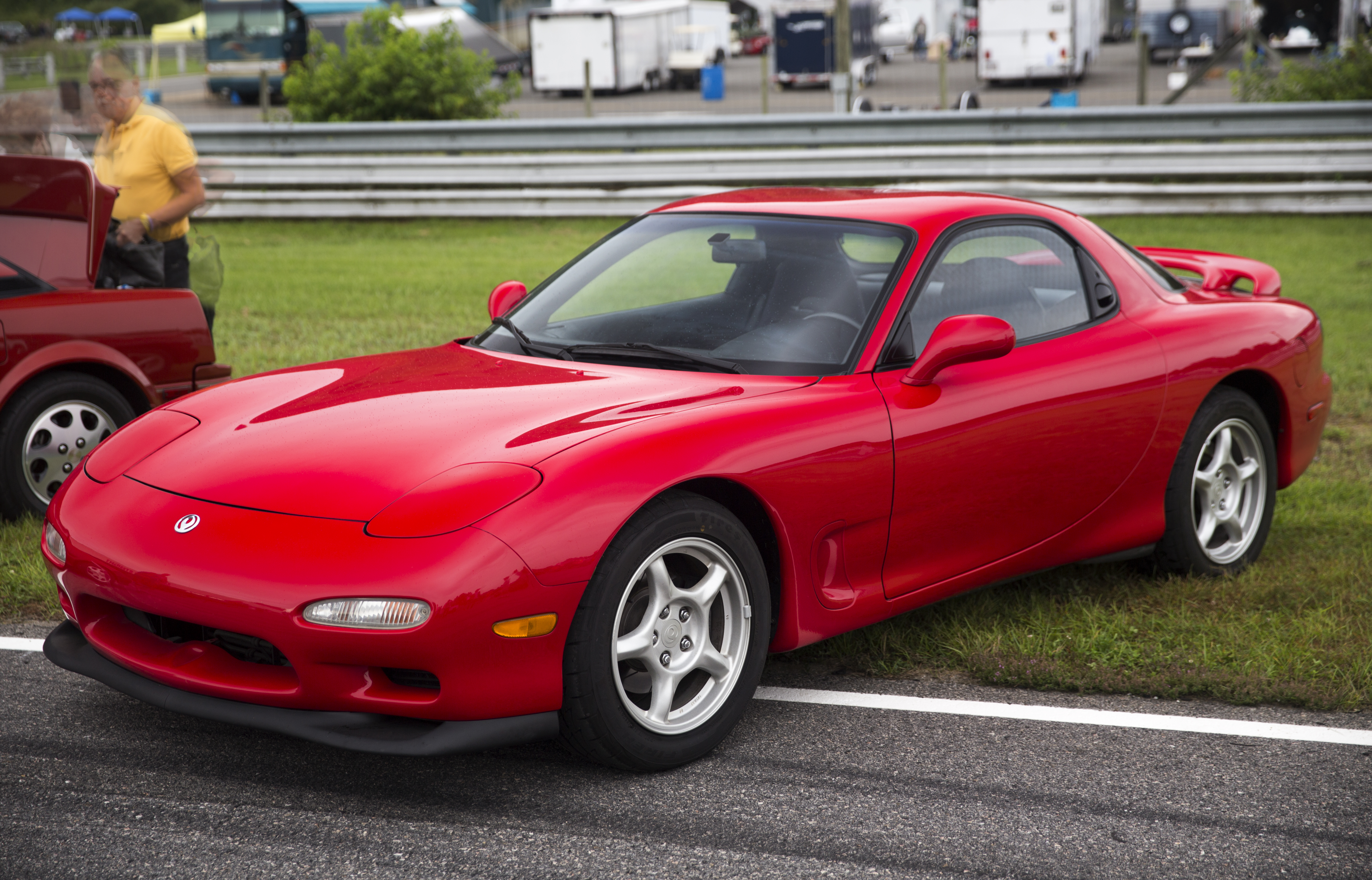
- 1994 Mazda RX-7 R2 (FD3S)

Overview
- Manufacturer: Mazda
- Also called: Mazda Savanna RX-7 (Japan, 1978–1991); Mazda ɛ̃fini RX-7 (Japan, 1991–1997)
- Production: 1978–2002; 811,634 produced
- Assembly: Japan: Hiroshima (Hiroshima Assembly)

Body and chassis
- Class: Sports car (S)
- Layout: Front mid-engine, rear-wheel-drive
- Platform: Mazda F

Chronology
- Predecessor: Mazda RX-3
- Successor: Mazda RX-8

The Mazda RX-7 is a sports car which was manufactured and marketed by Mazda from 1978 to 2002 across three generations. It has a front mid engine, rear-wheel-drive layout and uses a compact and lightweight Wankel rotary engine.

The first-generation RX-7, codenamed SA (early) and FB (late), is a two-seater coupé with a rear hatchback. It featured a 12A carbureted rotary engine as well as the option for a 13B rotary engine with electronic fuel injection in later years. The second-generation RX-7, carrying the internal model code FC, was offered as a two-seater coupé with a 2+2 option available in some markets, as well as in a convertible body style. This was powered by the 13B rotary engine, offered in naturally aspirated or turbocharged forms. The third-generation RX-7, model code FD, was offered as a two-seater coupé with a 2+2 version offered as an option for the Japanese market. It featured a sequentially turbocharged 13B REW engine.

More than 800,000 RX-7s were manufactured over its lifetime.

== First generation (SA, FB) ==
First generation (SA/FB)
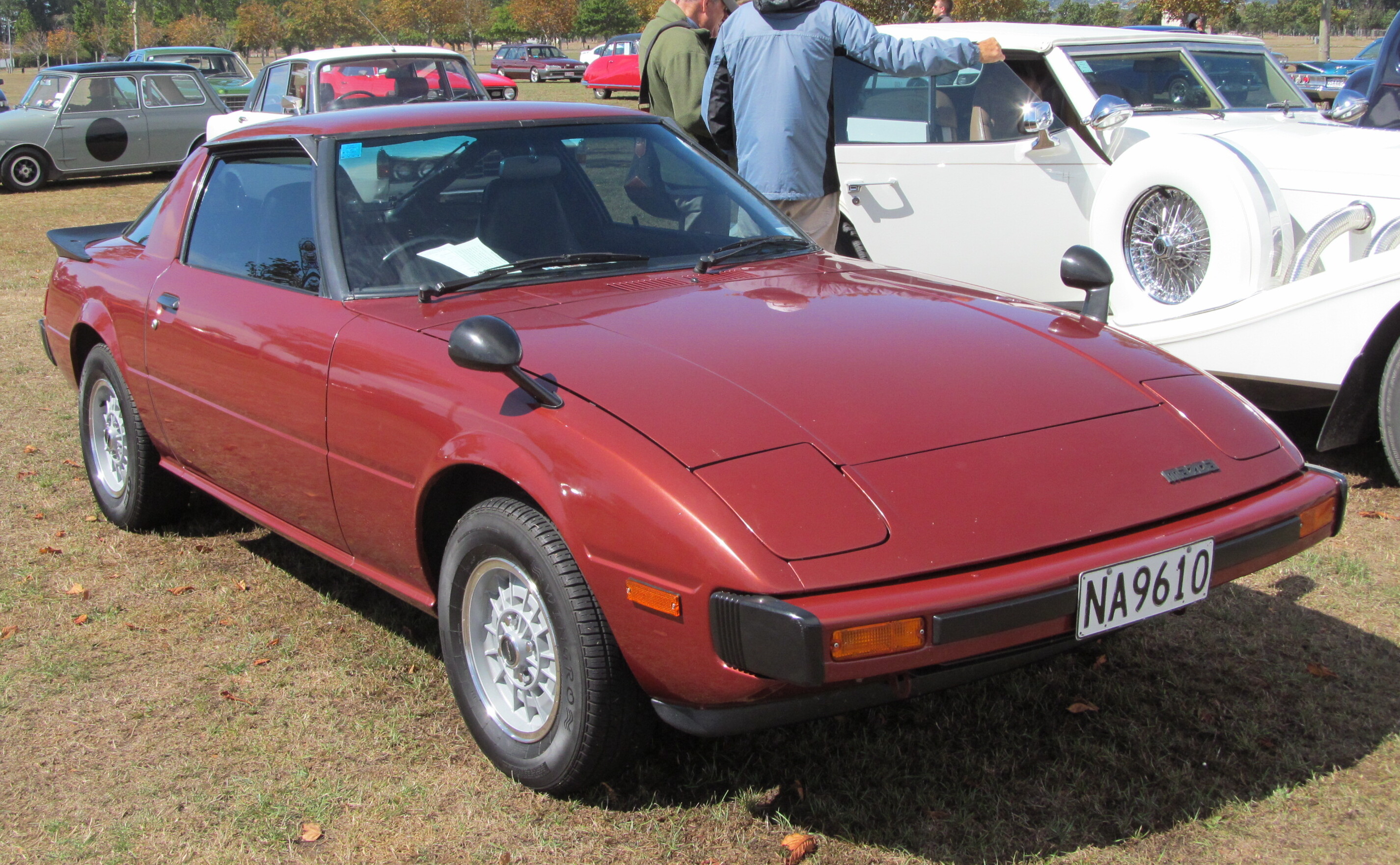
- 1980 Mazda RX-7 SE Limited

Overview
- Model code: SA22 / FB
- Also called: Mazda Savanna RX-7
- Production: 1978–1985; 471,018 produced
- Designer: Matasaburo Maeda (1976)

Body and chassis
- Body style: 2-door coupé

Powertrain
- Engine: 1146 cc 12A twin-rotor; 1146 cc turbo 12A twin-rotor; 1308 cc 13B-RESI twin-rotor
- Transmission: 4-speed manual; 5-speed manual; 3-speed automatic; 4-speed automatic

Dimensions
- Wheelbase: 2,420 mm (95.3 in)
- Length: 4,285 mm (168.7 in)
- Width: 1,675 mm (65.9 in)
- Height: 1,260 mm (49.6 in)
- Curb weight: 1,043–1,134 kg (2,300–2,500 lb)

=== Series 1 (1978–1980) ===
Series 1 (produced from 1978 until 1980) is commonly referred to as the "SA22C" from the first alphanumeric of the vehicle identification number. Mazda's internal project number for what was to become the RX-7 was X605. In Japan, it was introduced in March 1978, replacing the Savanna RX-3, and joined Mazda's only other remaining rotary engine-powered products, called the Cosmo, which was a two-door luxury coupé, and the Luce luxury saloon.

The lead designer at Mazda was Matasaburo Maeda (前田 又三郎, Maeda Matasaburō), whose son, Ikuo, would go on to design the Mazda Demio and the RX-7's successor, the RX-8. The transition of the Savanna to a sports car appearance reflected products from other Japanese manufacturers. The advantage the RX-7 had was its minimal size and weight, and the compact rotary engine installed behind the front axle helped balance the front and rear weight distribution, which provided a low center of gravity.

In Japan, the Savanna RX-7 was powered with a 12A Rotary engine which has been refined to meet increasingly stringent emissions. The refined 12A Rotary engine produces 130 PS (96 kW). In March 1979 Mazda adding a new line-up: the SE which has a sunroof.

In 1980, Mazda introduced a limited run North American model known as the Leathersport, or LS. The LS was essentially an uprated GS with additions such as LS badges on the B-pillars, exterior stripes, gold anodised wheels, brown leather upholstery, leather-wrapped steering wheel and shift knob, removable sunroof, four-speaker AM/FM stereo radio with power antenna (listed as a six-speaker stereo, as the two rear dual voice coil speakers were counted as four speakers), remote power door side mirrors, and standard GS equipment. Two primary options were also available; a 3-speed JATCO 3N71B automatic transmission and air conditioning. The dealer could add other GS options such as a cassette tape deck, splash guards, padded center console armrest, and others. The LS was only available in three exterior colours: Aurora White, Brilliant Black, and Solar Gold. Some sources say 2500 LS model cars were built, while others say production numbers are unknown. The LS had exposed steel bumpers and a high-mounted indentation for the rear license plate, called by Werner Buhler of Road & Track magazine a "Baroque depression."

=== Series 2 (1981–1983) ===
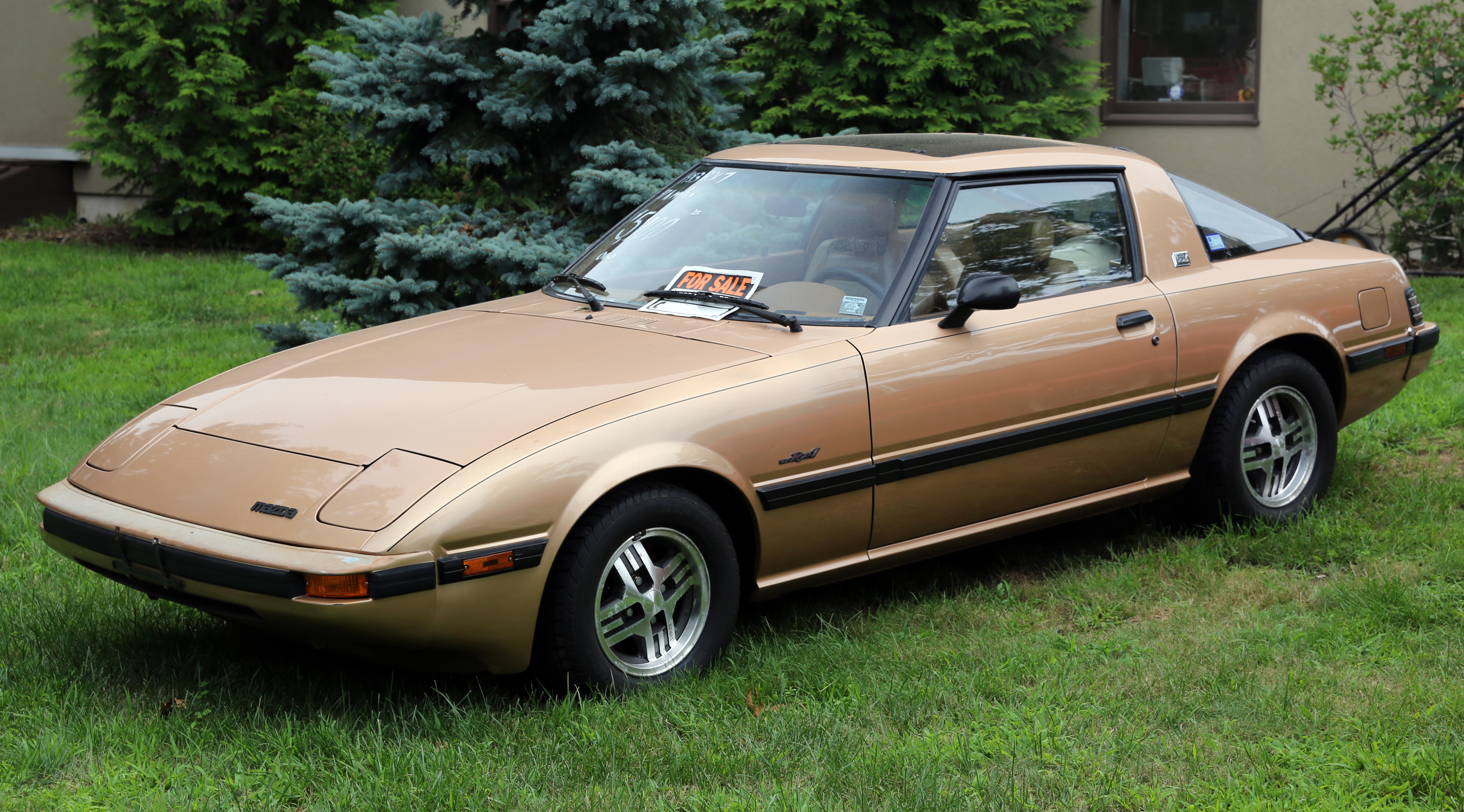
Mazda RX-7 Series 2 GSL (US; 1983)

The Series 2, referred to as the FB (produced from 1981 to 1983), had integrated plastic-covered bumpers, wide black rubber body side moldings, wraparound taillights, and updated engine control components. While marginally longer overall, the new model was 135 lb (61 kg) lighter in federalised trim. The four-speed manual option was dropped for 1981 as well, while the fuel tank grew larger and the dashboard was redesigned, including a shorter gear stick mounted closer to the driver. In 1983, the 130 mph (209 km/h) speedometer returned for the RX-7. The GSL package provided optional four-wheel disc brakes, front-ventilated (Australian model), and clutch-type rear limited-slip differential (LSD). This revision of the SA22 was known in North America as the "FB" after the US Department of Transportation mandated a 17-digit Vehicle Identification Number changeover. For various other markets worldwide, the 1981–1985 RX-7 retained the 'SA22C' VIN prefix. In the UK, the 1978–1980 series 1 cars carried the SA code on the VIN, but all later cars (1981–1983 series 2 and 1984–1985 series 3) carried the FB code, and these first-generation RX-7s are known as the "FB" only in North America.

In Japan, a well-appointed version similar to the export market GSL arrived late in 1982, called the SE-Limited. This model received two-tone paint, alloy wheels shaped like the Wankel rotor, all-wheel disc brakes, a limited-slip differential, and a full leather interior. It also had the latest iteration of the 12A rotary engine, the RE-6PI, with a variable induction port system and 140 PS (103 kW; 138 hp).

In Europe, the FB was mainly noticed for having received a power increase from the 105 PS (77 kW) of the SA22; the 1981 RX-7 now had 115 PS (85 kW) on tap. European market cars also received four-wheel disc brakes as standard.

=== Series 3 (1984–1985) ===
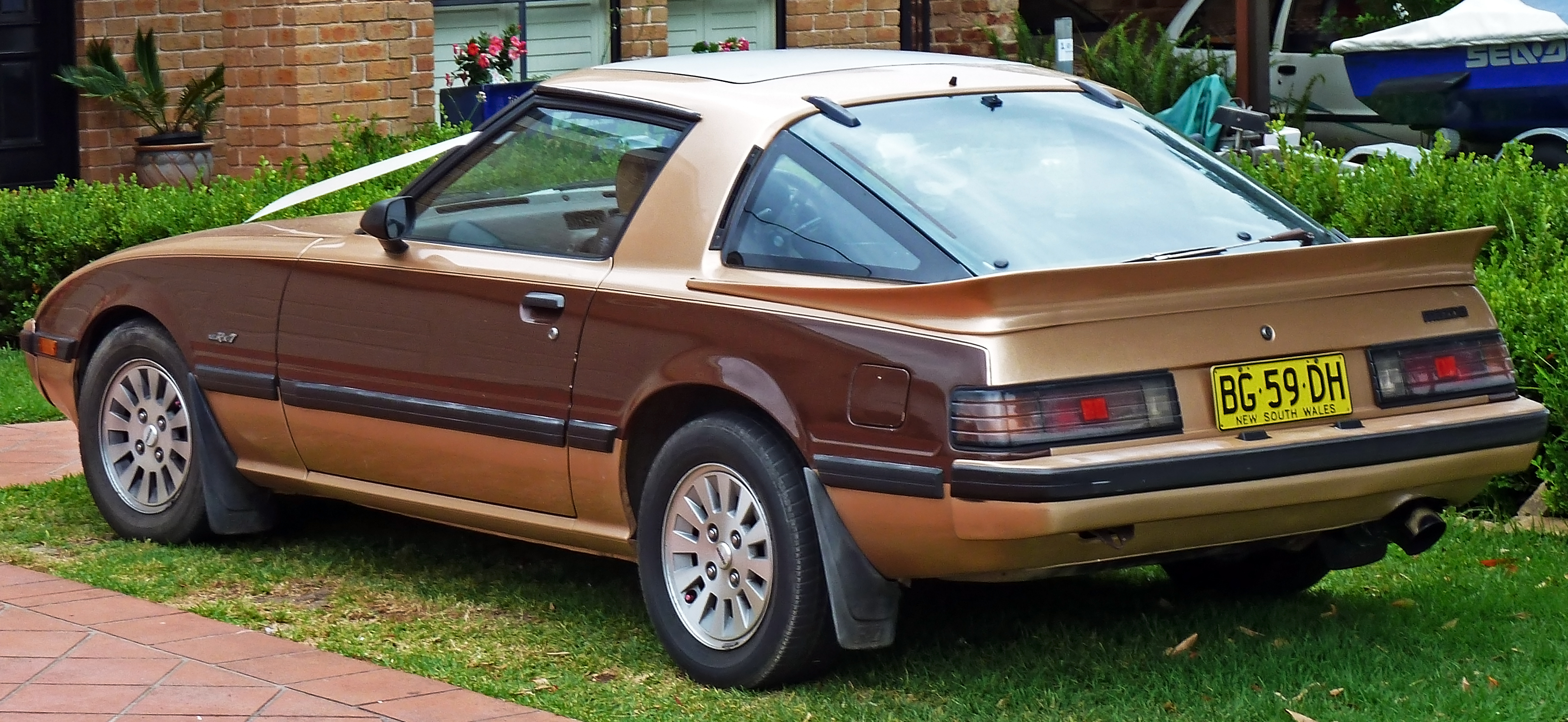
1984–1985 Mazda RX-7 (Series 3)

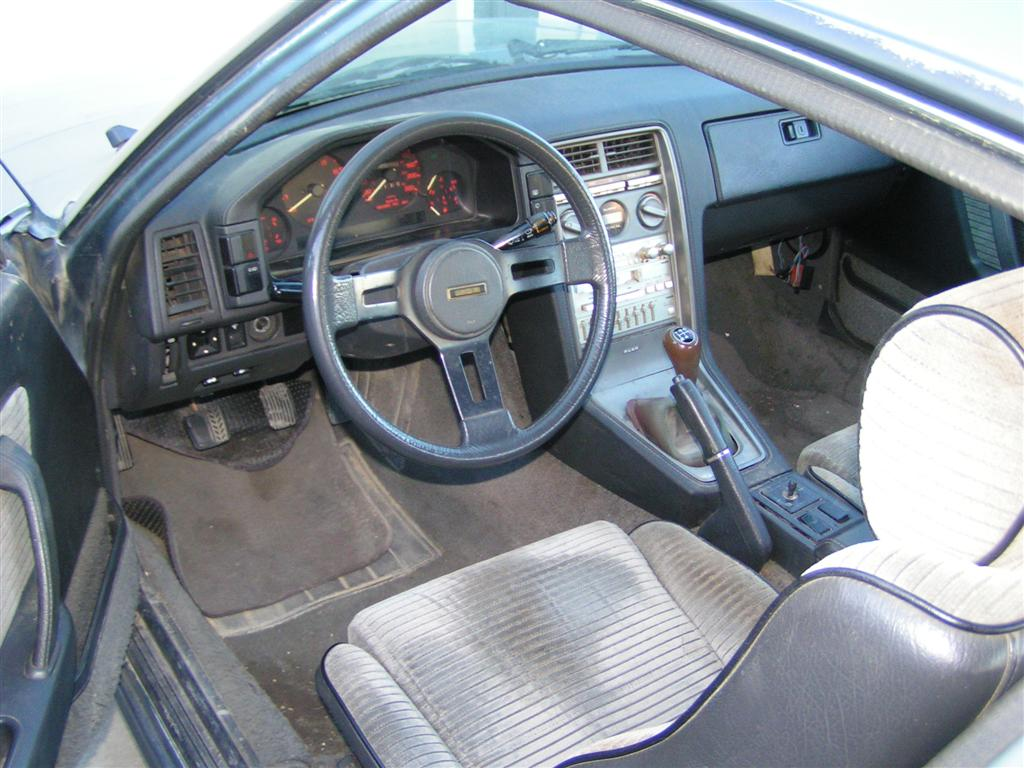
Series 3 interior (Canada)

The Series 3 (produced 1984–1985) featured an updated lower front fascia. North American models received a different instrument cluster. The GSL package was continued into this series, but Mazda introduced the GSL-SE sub-model. The GSL-SE had a fuel injected 1,308 cc (1.3 L) 13B RE-EGI engine rated at 135 hp (101 kW; 137 PS) and 133 lb⋅ft (180 N⋅m). GSL-SE models had much the same options as the GSL (clutch-type rear LSD and rear disc brakes), but the brake rotors were larger, allowing Mazda to use the more common lug nuts (versus bolts), and a new bolt pattern of 4x114.3mm (4x4.5"). They also had upgraded suspension with stiffer springs and shocks. The external oil cooler was reintroduced, after being dropped in the 1983 model-year for the controversial "beehive" water-oil heat exchanger.

The 1984 RX-7 GSL has an estimated 29 MPG (8.11 litres/100 km) highway/19 MPG (12.37 L/100 km) city. According to Mazda, its rotary engine allowed the RX-7 GSL to accelerate from 0 to 80 km/h (50 mph) in 6.3 seconds.

In 1985, Mazda introduced the RX-7 Finale in Australia. This was the last of the series and sold in limited numbers. The Finale featured power options and a brass plaque mentioning the number the car was as well as "Last of a legend" on the plaque. The finale had special stickers and a blacked out section between the window & rear hatch.

The RX-7 has "live axle" 4-link rear suspension with Watt's linkage, a 50:50 front and rear weight distribution, and weighs under 1,100 kg (2,425 lb). It was the lightest generation of the RX-7 ever produced. 12A-powered models accelerated from 0–97 km/h (60 mph) in 9.2 seconds, and turned 0.779 g (7.64 m/s^{2}) laterally on a skid pad. The 1,146 cc (1.1 L) 12A engine was rated at 100 hp (75 kW; 101 PS) at 6,000 rpm in North American models, allowing the car to reach speeds of over 190 km/h (120 mph). Because of the smoothness inherent in the Wankel rotary engine, little vibration or harshness was experienced at high engine speeds, so a buzzer was fitted to the tachometer to warn the driver when the 7,000 rpm redline was approaching.

The 12A engine has a long thin shaped combustion chamber, having a large surface area in relation to its volume. Therefore, combustion is cool, giving few oxides of nitrogen. However, the combustion is also incomplete, so there are large amounts of partly burned hydrocarbons and carbon monoxide. The exhaust is hot enough for combustion of these to continue into the exhaust. An engine-driven pump supplies air into the exhaust to complete the burn of these chemicals. This is done in the "thermal reactor" chamber where the exhaust manifold would normally be on a conventional engine. Under certain conditions, the pump injects air into the thermal reactor and at other times air is pumped through injectors into the exhaust ports. This fresh air is needed for more efficient and cleaner-burning of the air/fuel mixture.

Options and models varied from country to country. The gauge layout and interior styling in the Series 3 was only changed for the North American models. Additionally, North America was the only market to have offered the first generation of the RX-7 with the fuel-injected 13B, model GSL-SE. Sales of the first-generation RX-7 were strong, with a total of 471,018 cars produced; Between 332,850 and 367,878 (seventy to eighty percent) were sold in the United States alone.

=== RX-7 Turbo ===
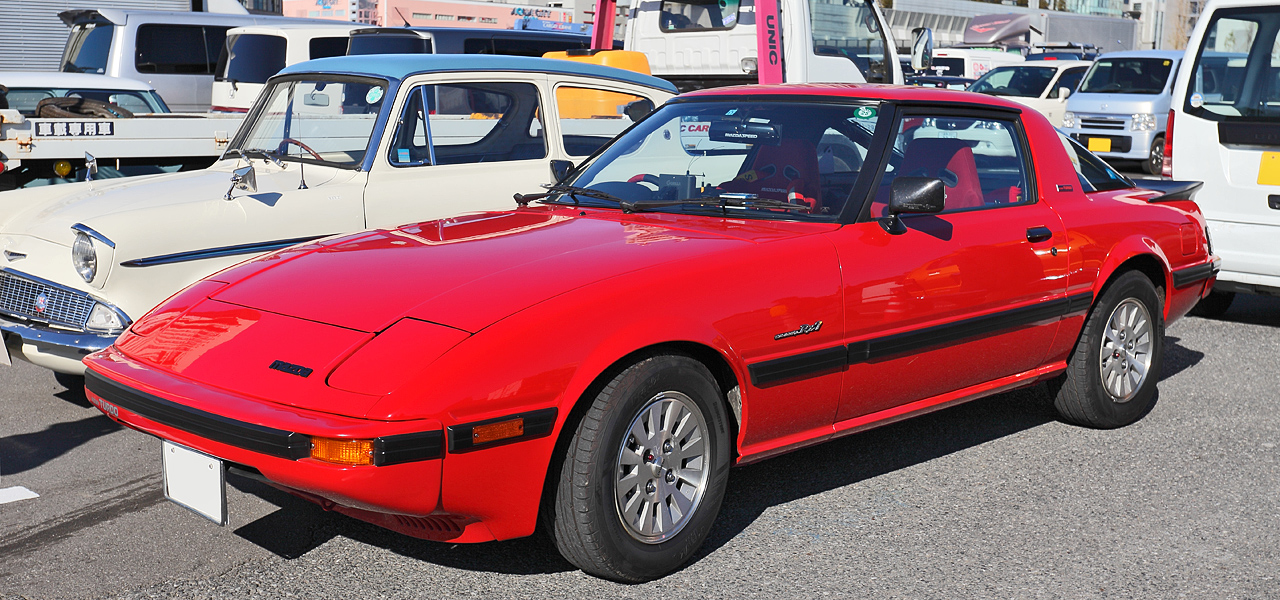
Mazda Savanna RX-7 Turbo

Following the introduction of the first turbocharged rotary engine in the Luce/Cosmo, a similar, also fuel injected and non-intercooled 12A turbocharged engine was made available for the top-end model of the Series 3 RX-7 in Japan. It was introduced in September 1983. The engine was rated at 165 PS (121 kW) (JIS) at 6,500 rpm. While the peak power figures were only slightly higher than those of the engine used in the Luce/Cosmo, the new "Impact Turbo" was developed specifically to deal with the different exhaust gas characteristics of a rotary engine. Both rotor vanes of the turbine were remodeled and made smaller, and the turbine had a twenty percent higher speed than a turbo intended for a conventional engine. The Savanna RX-7 Turbo was short-lived, as the next generation of the RX-7 was about to be introduced.

== Second generation (FC) ==
Second generation (FC)
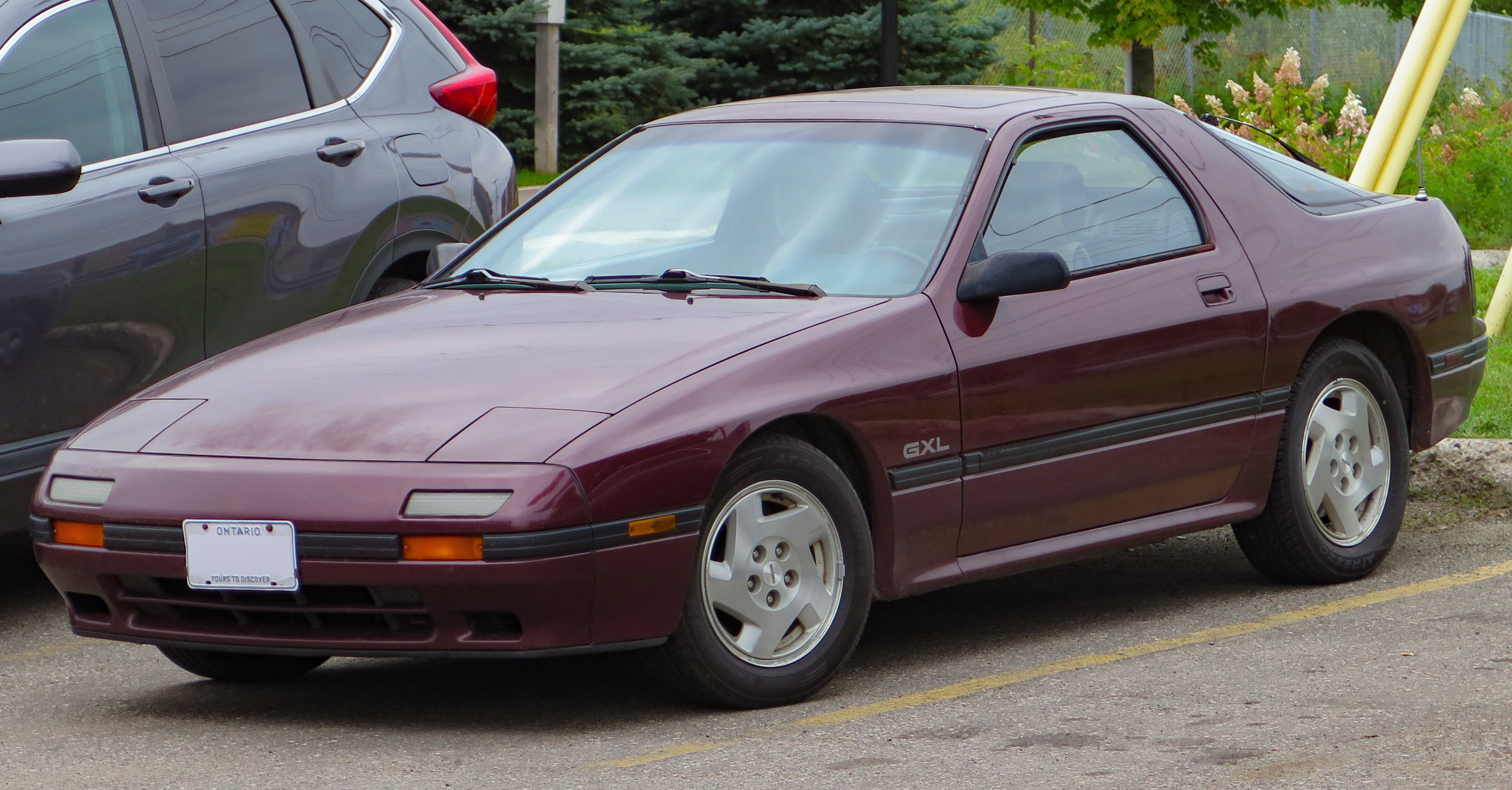
- 1988 Mazda RX-7 GXL

Overview
- Model code: FC
- Also called: Mazda Savanna RX-7
- Production: September 1985 – December 1991 (coupè); August 1987 – December 1992 (convertible); 272,027 produced
- Designer: Akio Uchiyama (lead designer)

Body and chassis
- Body style: 2-door coupé; 2-door convertible

Powertrain
- Engine: 1308 cc 13B twin-rotor; 1308 cc 13B-T turbo twin-rotor
- Transmission: 5-speed manual; 4-speed automatic

Dimensions
- Wheelbase: 2,431 mm (95.7 in)
- Length: 1986-88: 4,290 mm (168.9 in); 1989–92: 4,315 mm (169.9 in)
- Width: 1,689 mm (66.5 in)
- Height: 1,265 mm (49.8 in)
- Curb weight: 1,223–1,293 kg (2,696–2,851 lb)

The second-generation RX-7 (sometimes referred to as "FC", VIN begins JM1FC3 or JMZFC1), still known as the Mazda Savanna RX-7 in Japan, featured a complete restyling much like similar sports cars of the era such as the Nissan 300ZX. But upon closer inspection, it bears a striking resemblance to the Porsche 944. development team, led by Chief Project Engineer Akio Uchiyama (内山 昭朗), chose to focus on the American market when designing the FC, where the majority of first-generation of the RX-7 models had been sold. The team drew inspiration from successful sports cars that were popular at the time, such as studying the suspension design of the Porsche 928.

While the first-generation RX-7 was a purer sports car, the second-generation RX-7 tended toward the softer sport-tourer trends of its day, sharing some similarities with the HB series Cosmo. Handling was much improved, with less of the oversteer tendencies of the previous version. The rear end design was improved from the SA22's live rear axle to a more modern, independent rear suspension (rear axle). Steering was more precise, with rack and pinion steering replacing the old recirculating ball steering of the SA22. Disc brakes also became standard, with some models (S4: Sport, GXL, GTU, Turbo II, Convertible; S5: GXL, GTU^{s}, Turbo, Convertible) offering four-piston front brakes. The rear seats were optional in some models of the FC RX-7, but are not commonly found in the American market. Mazda also introduced Dynamic Tracking Suspension System (DTSS) in the FC. The revised independent rear suspension incorporated special toe control hubs which were capable of introducing a limited degree of passive rear steering under cornering loads. The DTSS worked by allowing a slight amount of toe-out under normal driving conditions but induced slight toe-in under heavier cornering loads at around 0.5g or more; toe-out in the rear allows for a more responsive rotation of the rear, but toe-in allowed for a more stable rear under heavier cornering. Another new feature was the Auto Adjusting Suspension (AAS). The system changed damping characteristics according to the road and driving conditions, as well as compensating for camber changes and providing anti-dive and anti-squat effects.

In Japan, a limited edition second-generation infini RX-7 was available with production limited to only 600 cars for each year. Some special noted features for all Infini series are: infinity badge on the rear, upgraded suspension, upgraded ECU, higher power output of the engine, reduced weight, 15-inch BBS aluminium alloy wheels, ɛ̃fini logo steering wheel, aero bumper kits, bronze-coloured window glass, floor bar on the passenger side, aluminium bonnet with scoop, and front strut bar. The car was thought as the pinnacle of the RX-7 series (until the introduction of the third generation RX-7). The Infini IV came with other special items such as black bucket seats, 16-inch BBS wheels, Knee pads, and all the other items mentioned before. There are differing years for the ɛ̃fini, which denoted the series.

Series I was introduced in 1987, Series II was introduced in 1988, Series III was introduced in 1989, and Series IV was introduced in 1990. Series I and II came in White or Black exterior colour, Series III came in Shade Green only, and Series IV came in Shade Green or Noble Green exterior colours. There are only minor differences between the Series models, the biggest change which was from the Series I and II being an S4 and the Series III and IV being an S5.

The Turbo II model uses a turbocharger with a twin-scroll design, initially pumping out 25 percent more power than its naturally aspirated counterpart. The Turbo II also has an air-to-air intercooler which has a dedicated intake on the bonnet. The intake is slightly offset toward the left side of the bonnet. In the Japanese market, only the turbocharged engine was available; the naturally-aspirated version was only available for select export markets. This can be attributed to insurance companies in many Western nations penalizing turbocharged cars (this restricting potential sales). The Japanese market car produces 185 PS (136 kW) in the original version.

A minor change was made in April 1989, with the rear lamps being changed from square to three round lamps, changes made to the suspension, the door mirrors being made the same colour, changes to the front and rear bumpers and body mouldings, aluminium wheels, front seats, instrument panel centre, and instrument design. This engine was upgraded to 205 PS (151 kW) as part of the Series 5 facelift. The limited edition, two-seater ɛ̃fini model received a 215 PS (158 kW) version beginning in June 1990, thanks to an upgraded exhaust system and high-octane fuel.

Before full-change to FD model, the limited edition Winning Limited was released in September 1991. Based on the FC3S, 1,000 units of the final special edition "Winning Limited" model were released to commemorate the Mazda 787B's victory in the Le Mans 24 Hours race. It was only offered with the coupé body. It was available in standard colours, as well as optional colours such as dark green and bright red.

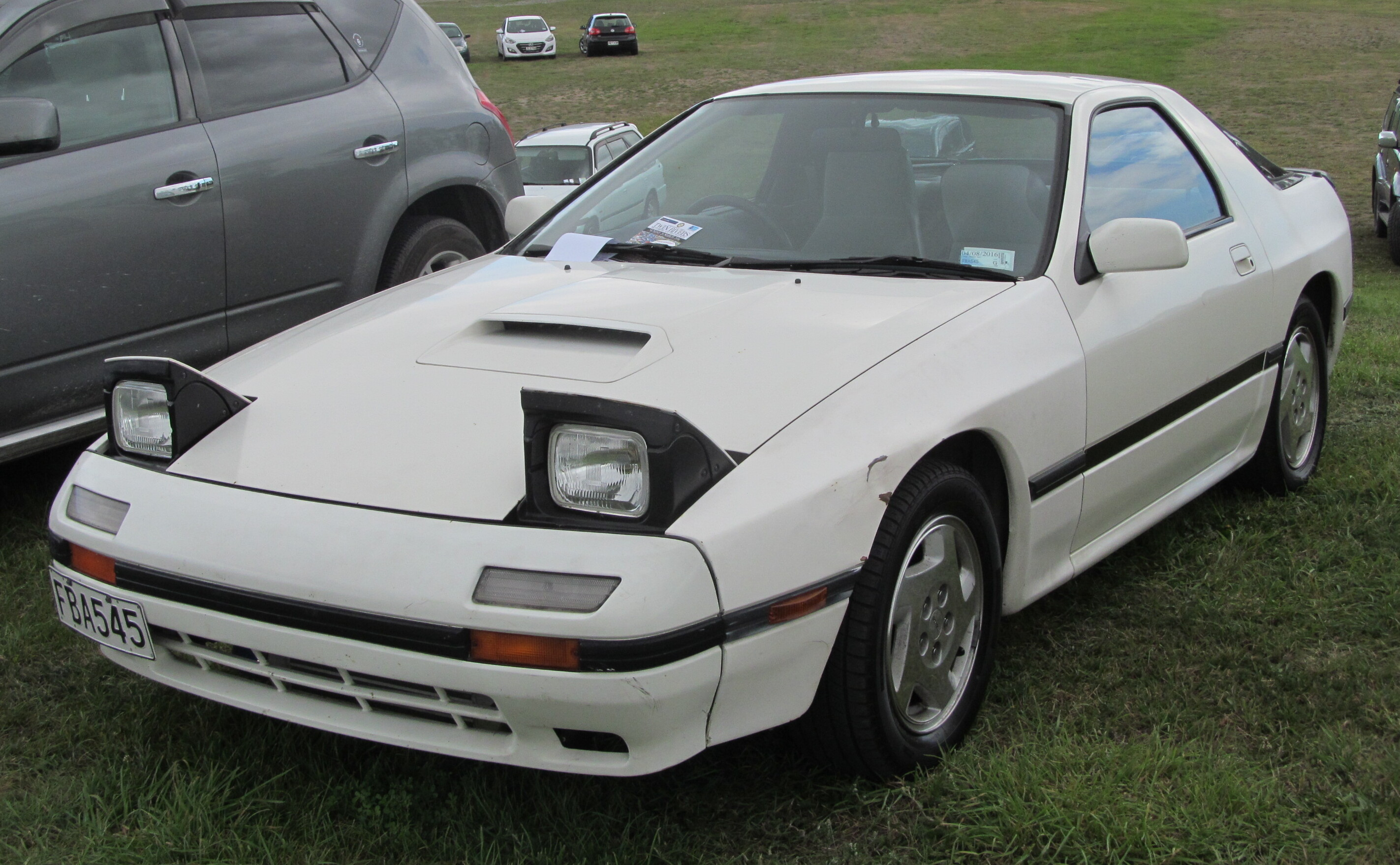
1986 Mazda RX-7 Turbo (JDM), note the intercooler scoop on the bonnet distinguishing it from the naturally aspirated models

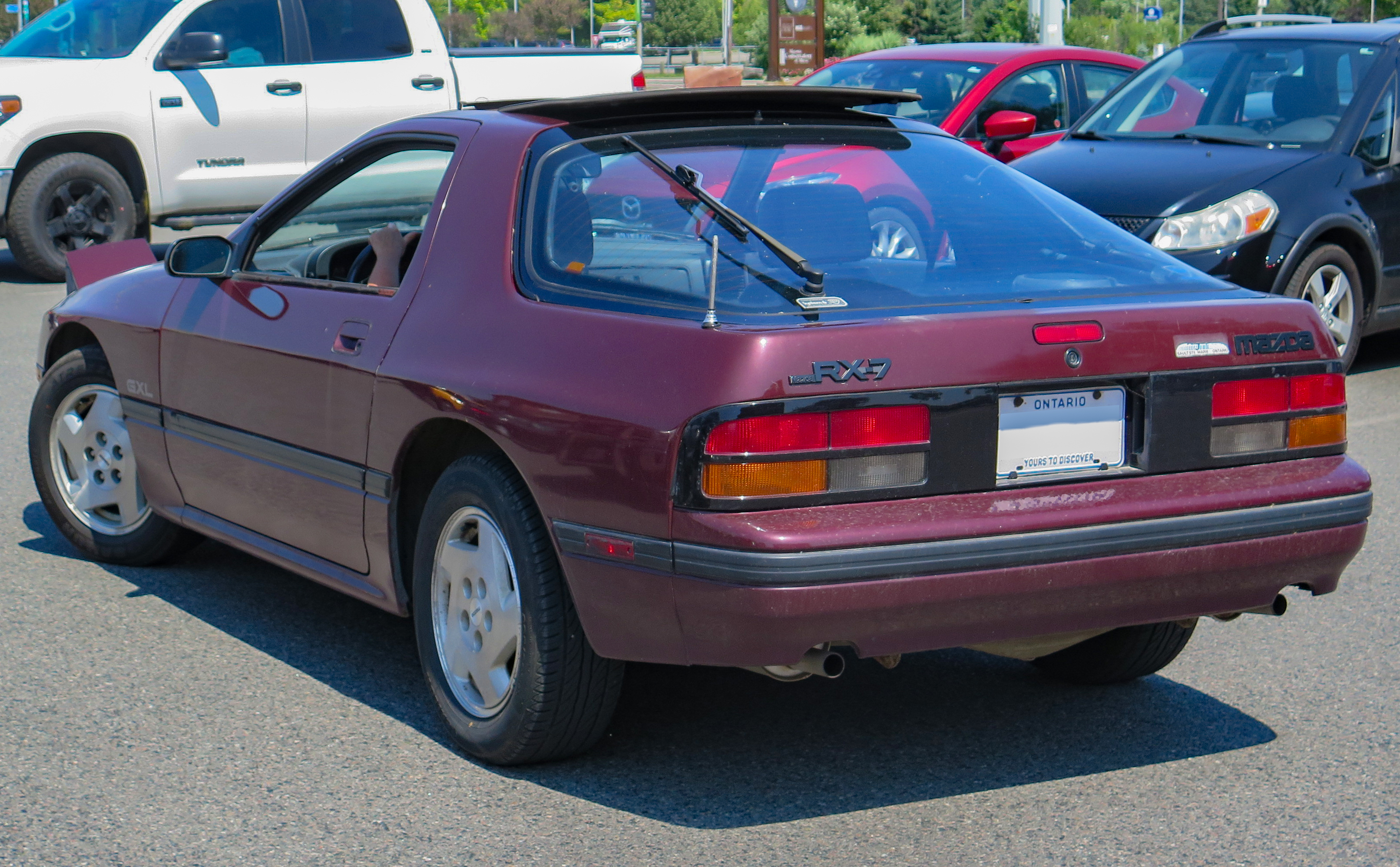
1988 Mazda RX-7 GXL

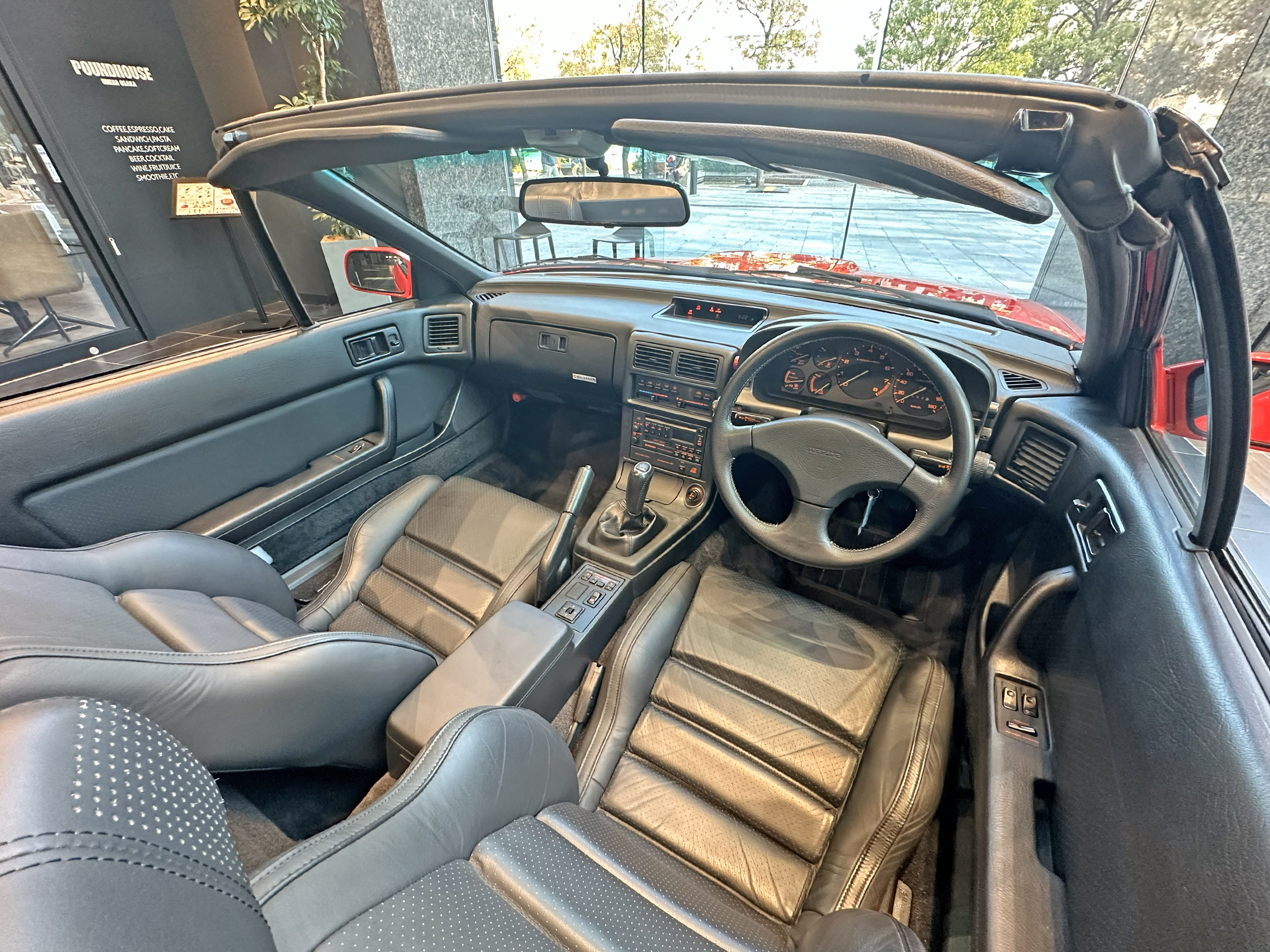
Interior

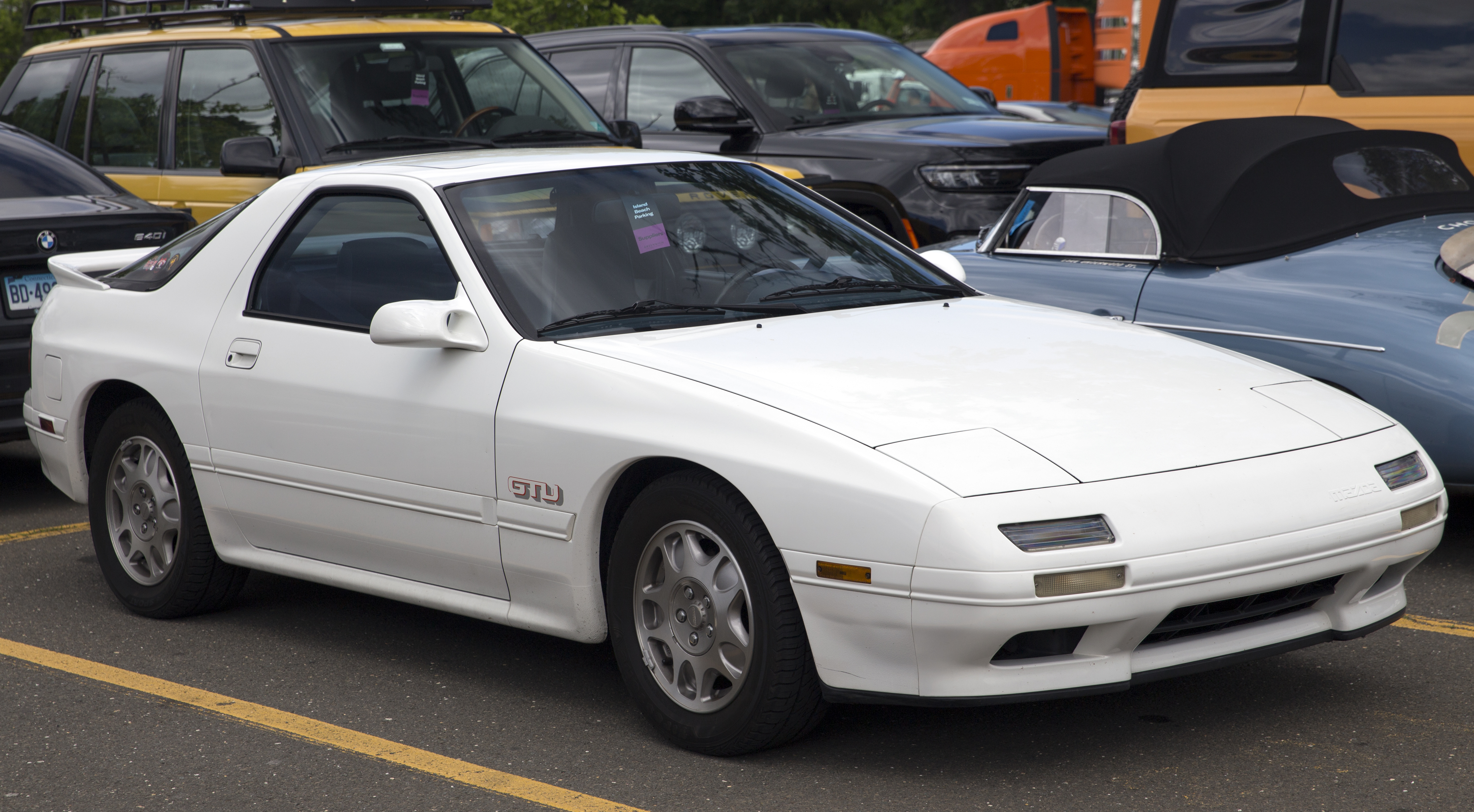
1989 Mazda RX-7 GTU (facelift)

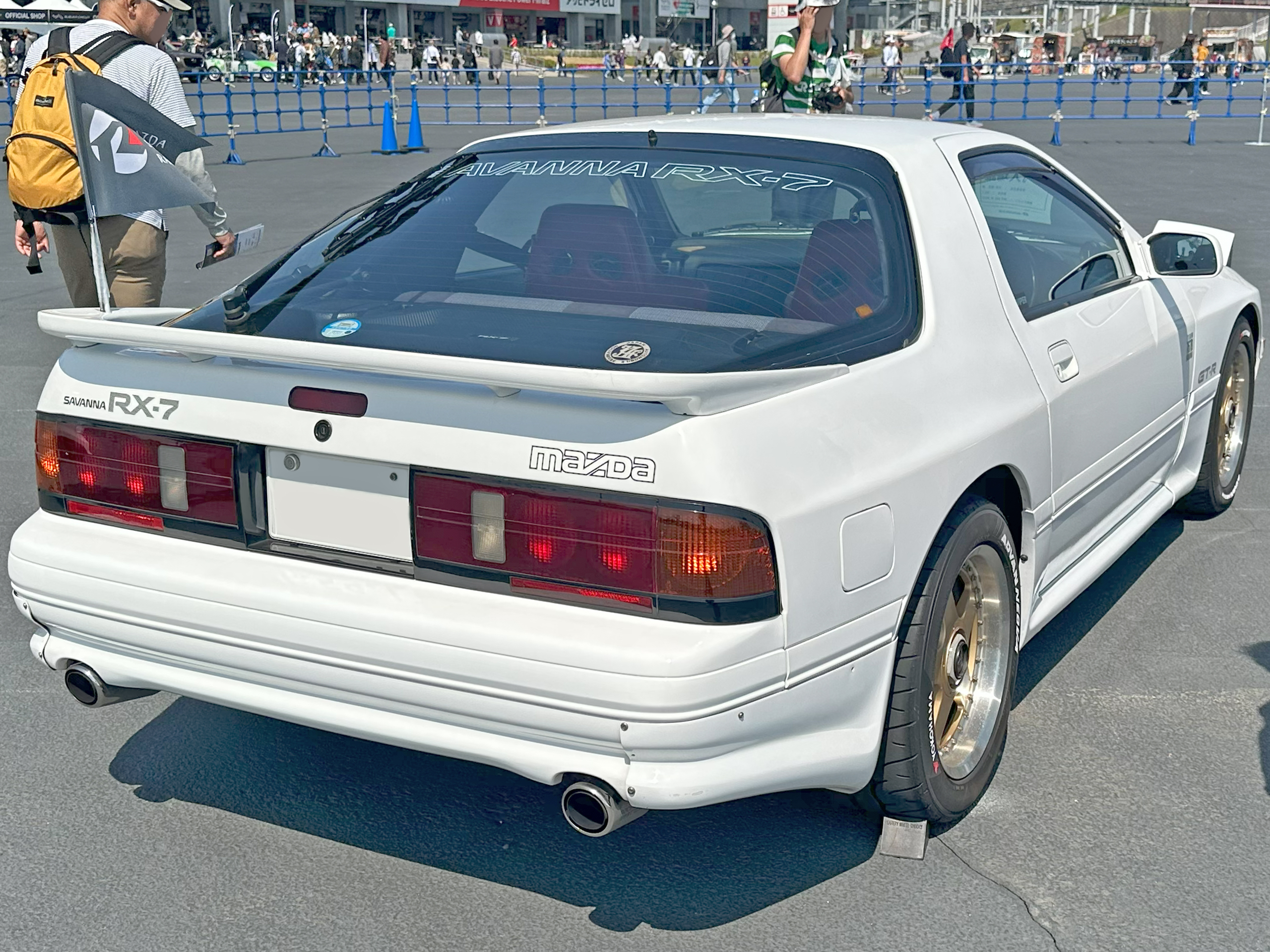
Mazda Savanna RX-7 GTR rear view (facelift)

=== GTU^{s} (1989–1990) ===
In 1989, with the introduction of the facelifted FC RX-7, and to commemorate the RX-7s 8 straight wins in the IMSA GTU class from 1980 to 1987, Mazda introduced a limited model labeled the GTU^{s}. Starting with the lightweight base model GTU, the GTU^{s} added items found on the Turbo model such as four-piston front brakes, ventilated rear brake rotors, vehicle speed-sensing power steering, one-piece front chin spoiler, cloth-covered Turbo model seats, leather-wrapped steering wheel, 16-inch wheels, 205/55VR tyres, and a GTU^{s}-only 4.300 viscous-type limited-slip differential (all other FC LSD's were 4.100). This allowed quicker acceleration from the naturally aspirated 13B rotary engine. Although it has been rumored that Mazda built between 100 and 1100 GTU^{s}' between 1989 and 1990, there is no official documentation from Mazda on how many have been built. The most reliable way to determine a GTU^{s} is by taking the VIN to a Mazda dealer and they can look to see if the internal coding for the car comes up as a GS model designation.

=== 1988 10th Anniversary RX-7 ===
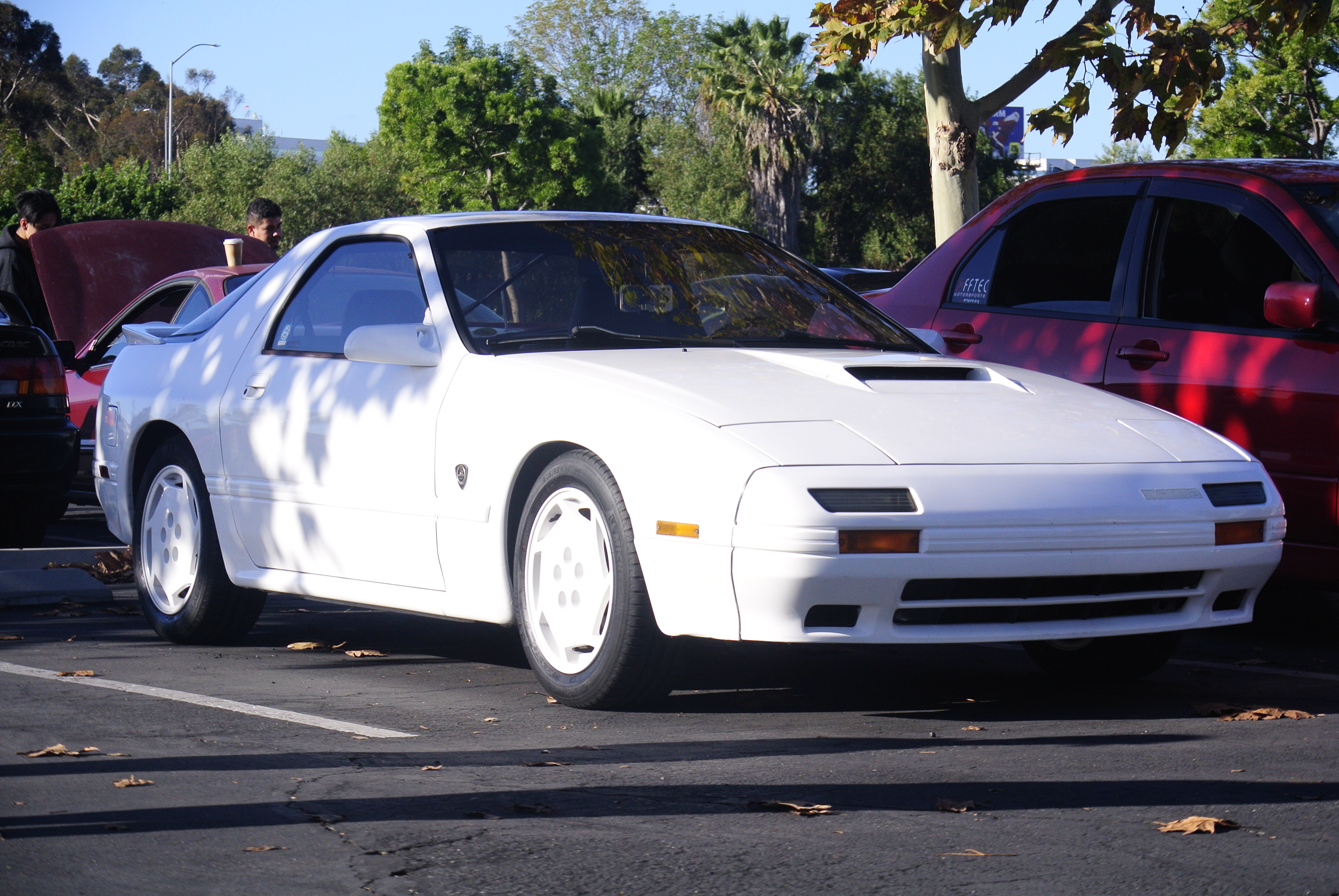
Mazda RX-7 10th Anniversary Edition

Mazda introduced the 10th Anniversary RX-7 in 1988 as a limited production model based on the RX-7 Turbo II. Production was limited to 1,500 units. The 10th Anniversary RX-7 features a Crystal White monochromatic paint scheme with matching white body side moldings, tail light housings, mirrors and 16-inch alloy seven-spoke wheels.

There were two "series" of 10th Anniversary models, with essentially a VIN-split running production change between the two. The most notable difference between the series can be found on the exterior- the earlier "Series I" cars had a black "Mazda" logo decal on the front bumper cover, whereas most if not all "Series II" cars did not have the decal. Series II cars also received the lower seat cushion height/tilt feature that Series I cars lacked. Another distinctive exterior feature is the bright gold rotor-shaped 10th Anniversary Edition badge on the front fenders (yellow-gold on the Series II cars). A distinctive 10th Anniversary package feature is the all black leather interior (code D7), which included not just the seats, but the door panel inserts as well and a leather-wrapped MOMO steering wheel (with 10th Anniversary Edition embossed horn button) and MOMO leather-wrapped shift knob with integrated boot. All exterior glass is bronze tinted (specific in North America to only the 10th Anniversary), and the windshield was equipped with the embedded secondary antenna also found on some other select models with the upgraded stereo packages.

Other 10th Anniversary Edition specific items were headlight washers (the only RX-7 in the US market that got this feature), glass breakage detectors added to the factory alarm system, 10th Anniversary Edition logoed floor mats, 10th Anniversary Edition embroidered front bonnet protector and accompanying front end mask, and an aluminium under pan.

=== Convertible ===
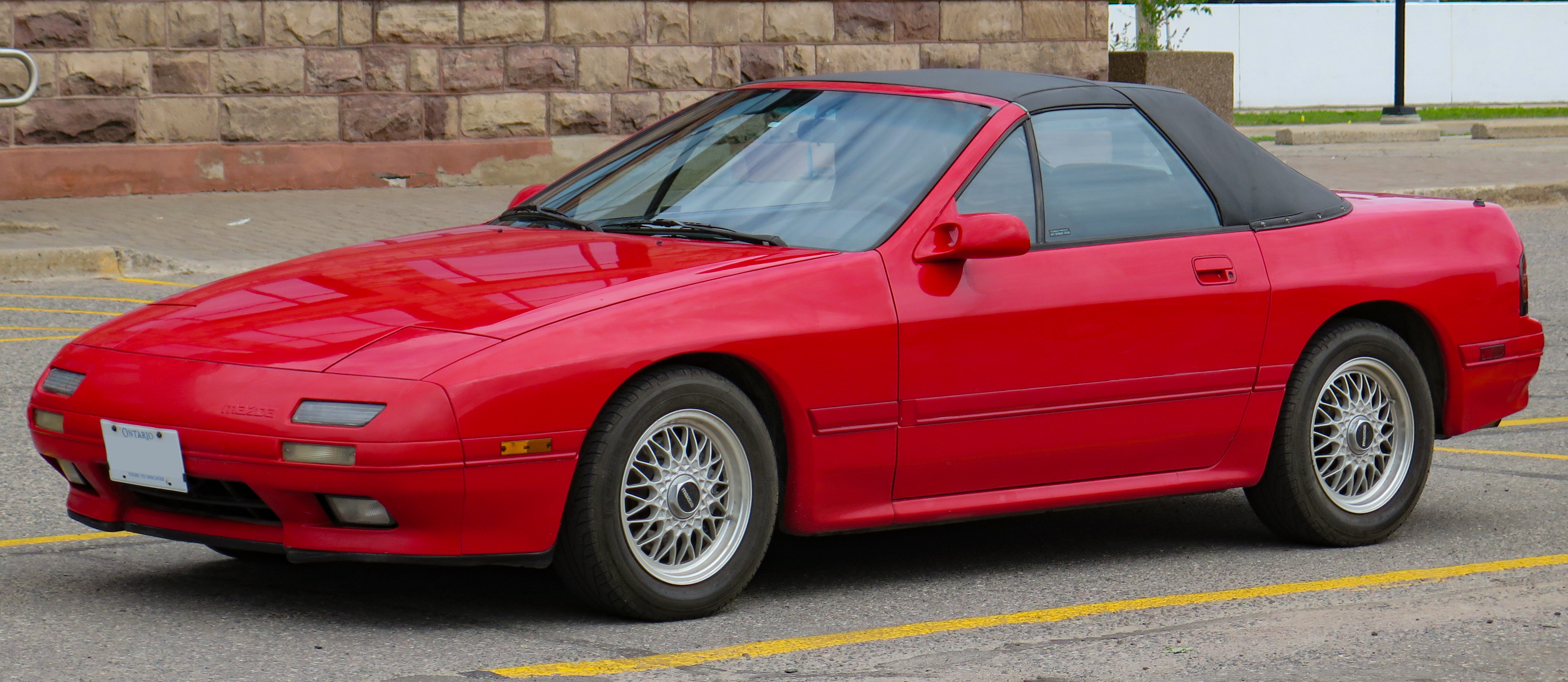
1989 Mazda RX-7 convertible (FC)

Mazda introduced a convertible version of the RX-7, the FC3C, in 1987 for Japan. It followed in 1988 in the US market, with ads featuring actor James Garner, at the time featured in many Mazda television advertisements. In the US market, the convertible was only offered with a naturally aspirated engine, while in other markets it was only offered with the turbocharged engine. About 22,000 convertibles were built.

The convertible featured a removable rigid section over the passengers and a folding vinyl rear section with heated rear glass window. The top is power operated, and lowering it requires unlatching two header catches, power lowering the top, exiting the car (or reaching over to the right-side latch), and folding down the rigid section manually. Mazda introduced with the convertible the first integral windblocker, a rigid panel that folded up from behind the passenger seats to block unwanted drafts from reaching the passengers—thereby extending the driving season for the car with the top retracted. The convertible also featured optional headrest-mounted audio speakers and a folding leather snap-fastened tonneau cover. The convertible assembly was precisely engineered and manufactured, and dropped into the ready body assembly as a complete unit—a first in convertible production.

Production ceased in 1991, with Mazda marketing a limited final run of 500 examples for 1992 for the domestic market only.

=== North America ===
The Series 4 (produced for the 1986 through the 1988 model years) was available with a naturally aspirated, fuel injected 13B-VDEI producing 146 hp (109 kW; 148 PS) in North American spec. An optional turbocharged model, known as the Turbo II in the American market, was rated at 182 hp (136 kW; 185 PS) at around 6,500 rpm and 183 lb⋅ft (248 N⋅m) of torque at 3,500 rpm. The turbo model was introduced at the Chicago Auto Show in February 1986, with a target of 20 percent of overall RX-7 sales.

The Series 5 (1989–1992) featured updated styling and better engine management, as well as lighter rotors and a higher compression ratio 9.7:1 for the naturally aspirated model, and 9.0:1 for the turbo model. The naturally aspirated Series 5's 13B-DEI engine was rated at 160 hp (119 kW; 162 PS), while the Series 5 Turbo was rated at 200 hp (149 kW; 203 PS) at 6,500 rpm and 195 lb⋅ft (264 N⋅m) of torque at 3,500 rpm.

== Third generation (FD) ==
Third generation (FD)
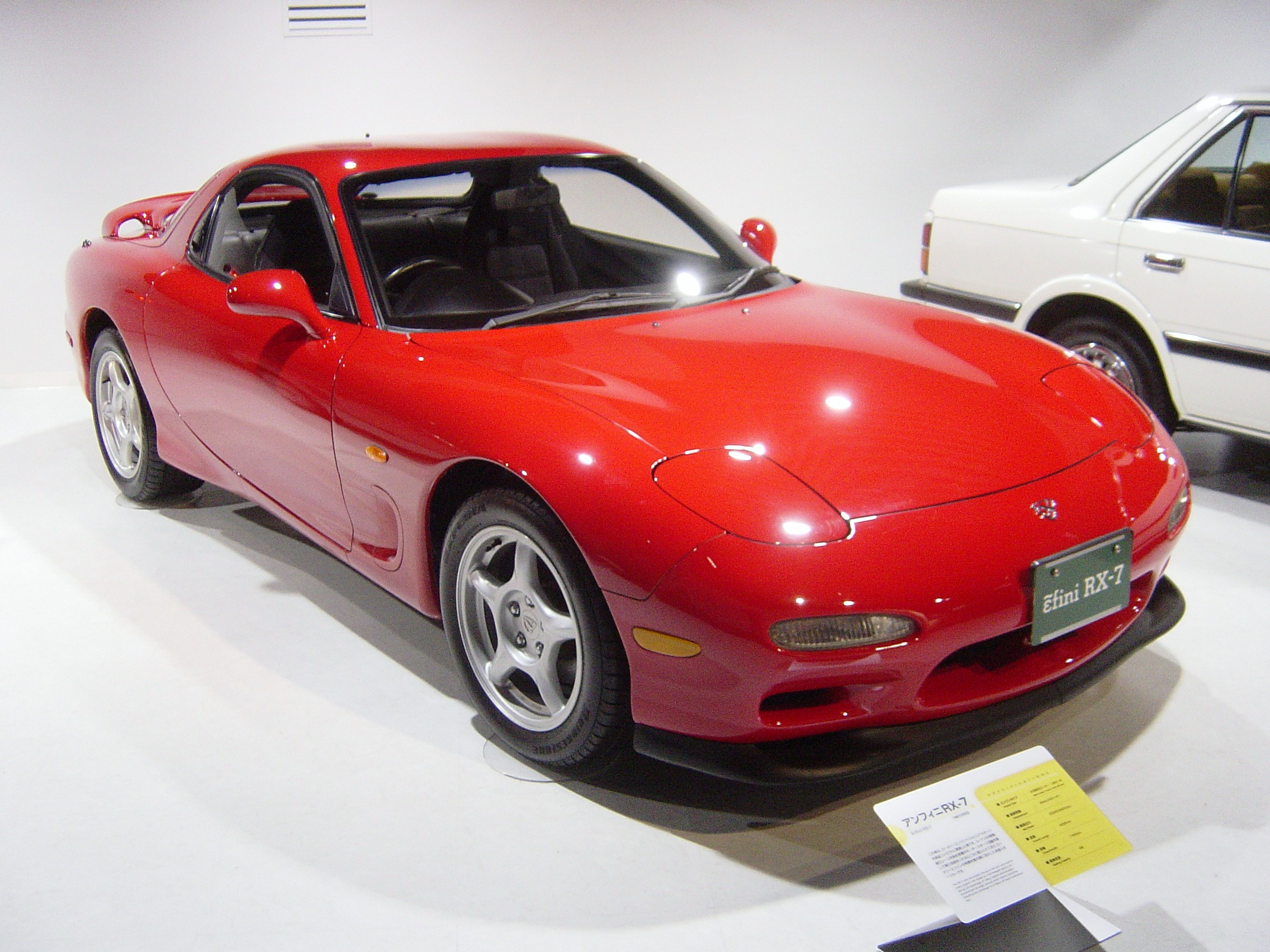

Overview
- Model code: FD
- Also called: ɛ̃fini RX-7 (Japan, 1991–1997)
- Production: October 1991– August 2002; 68,589 produced
- Model years: 1993–1995 (North America)
- Designer: Wu-Huang Chin; Tom Matano; Yoichi Sato (Chief Designer)

Body and chassis
- Body style: 2-door coupé

Powertrain
- Engine: 1308 cc 13B-REW twin-turbo twin-rotor
- Transmission: 5-speed manual; 4-speed automatic

Dimensions
- Wheelbase: 2,446 mm (96.3 in)
- Length: 4,285 mm (168.7 in)
- Width: 1,760 mm (69.3 in)
- Height: 1,230 mm (48.4 in)
- Curb weight: 1,218–1,340 kg (2,685–2,954 lb)

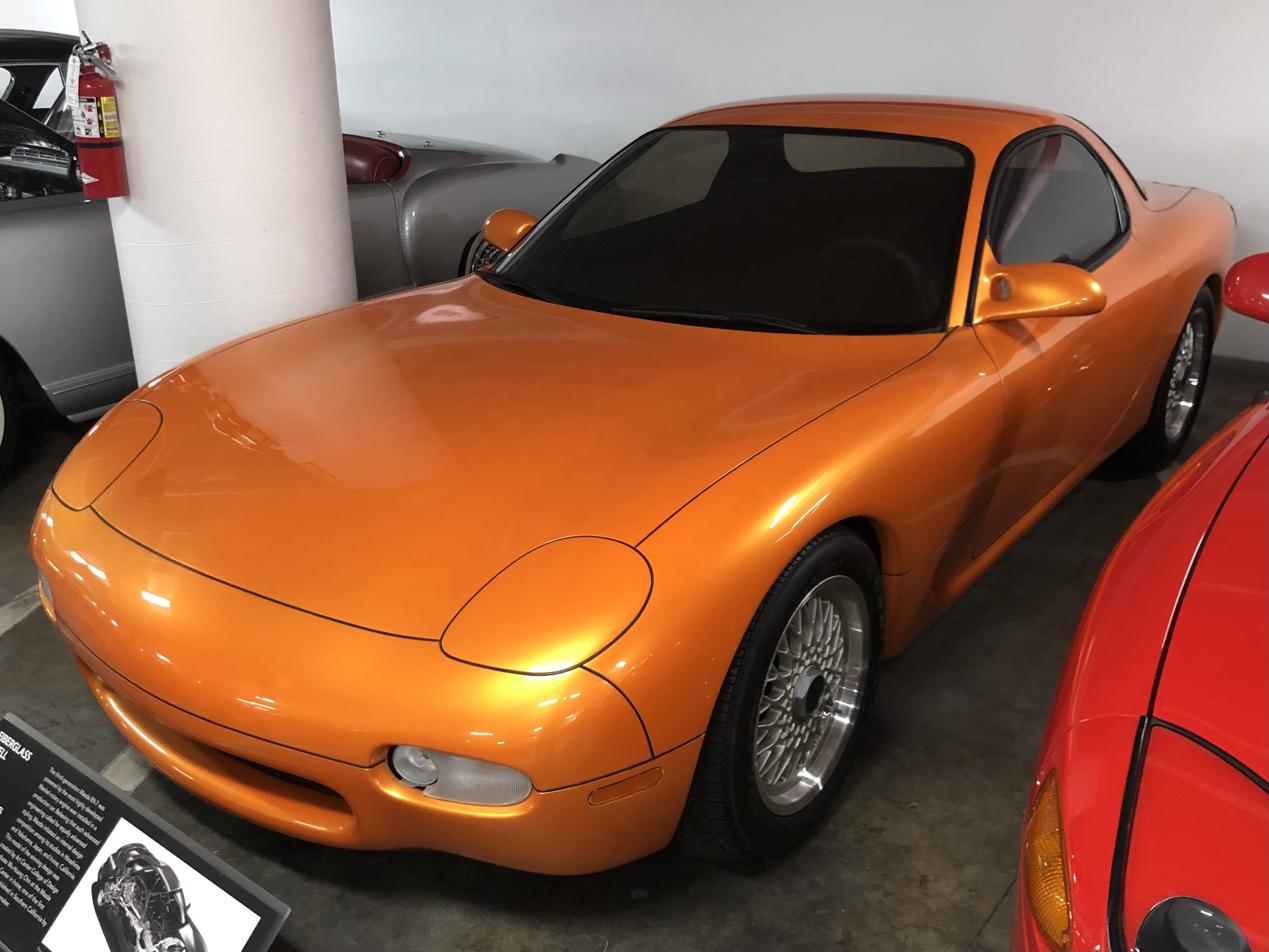
The winning concept design for the FD RX-7, designed by Wu-Huang Chin at Mazda's Design Center in Irvine

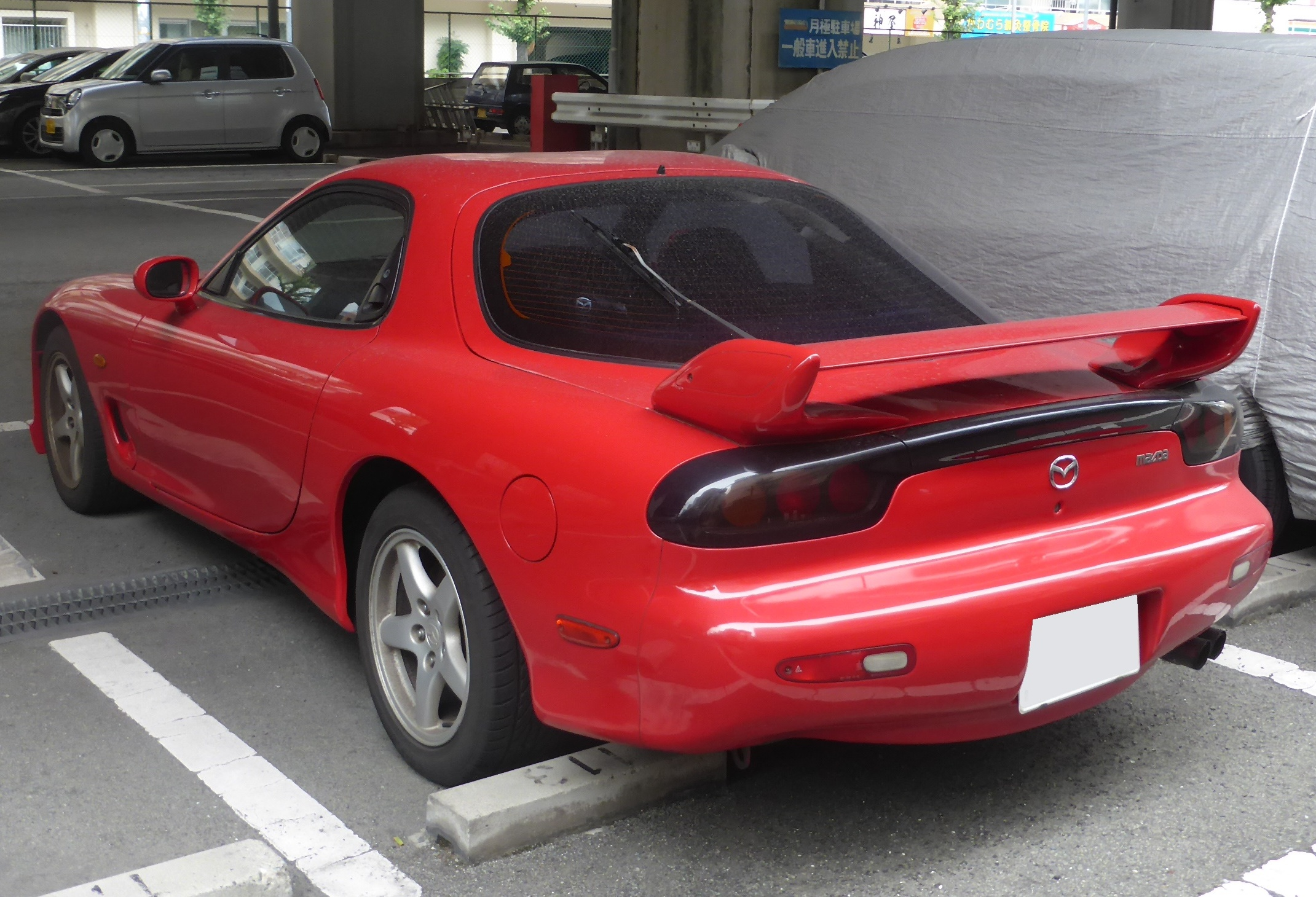
Rear view

The third-generation RX‑7, (sometimes referred to as FD, chassis code FD3S for Japan and JM1FD for the North America), featured an updated body design. Announced in October 1991, production began later that month before going on sale in December in the domestic Japanese market. Left-Hand-Drive export production began shortly after. The 13B-REW engine was the first-ever mass-produced sequential twin-turbocharger system to be exported from Japan, boosting power to 255 PS (188 kW; 252 hp) in 1992 and finally to 280 PS (206 kW; 276 hp) by the time production ended in Japan in 2002.

For the third-generation RX-7, Mazda organised an internal design competition between its four design studios in Hiroshima, Yokohama, Irvine, and Europe. The winning design came from their Design Center in Irvine and was designed by Taiwanese automotive artist Wu-huang Chin (秦無荒), who also worked on the Mazda MX-5 Miata, with help from Tom Matano. The interior design, though, originated from the Hiroshima design proposal. Mazda's chief designer Yoichi Sato (佐藤 洋一, Satō Yōichi) then helped take the concept design to its final production form.

In Japan, sales were affected by this series' non-compliance with Japanese dimension regulations and Japanese buyers paid annual taxes for the car's non-compliant width. As the RX‑7 was now considered an upper-level luxury sports car due to the increased width dimensions, Mazda also offered two smaller offerings, the Eunos Roadster, and the Eunos Presso hatchback.

The sequential twin-turbocharging system, introduced in 1992, was extremely complex and was developed with the aid of Hitachi. It was previously used on the exclusive-to-Japan Cosmo JC Series. The system used two turbochargers, one to provide 10 psi (0.69 bar) of boost from 1,800 rpm. The second turbocharger activated in the upper half of the rpm range, during full-throttle acceleration – at 4,000 rpm to maintain 10 psi (0.69 bar) until redline. The changeover process occurred at 4,500 rpm, with a momentary dip in pressure to 8 psi (0.55 bar), and provided semi-linear acceleration from a wide torque curve throughout the entire rev range under normal operation.

Under high-speed-driving conditions, the changeover process produced a significant increase in power output and forced technical drivers to adjust their driving style to anticipate and mitigate any over-steer during cornering. The standard turbo control system used 4 control solenoids, 4 actuators, both a vacuum and pressure chamber, and several feet of preformed vacuum/pressure hoses, all of which were prone to failure in part due to complexity and the inherent high temperatures of the rotary engine.

Information about various trims and models is listed as follows:

Series 6 (1992–1995)
Model	Power output	Torque	Gearbox	Weight
Type R	255 PS (188 kW; 252 hp)	294 N⋅m (217 lbf⋅ft)	5-speed manual	1,260 kg (2,778 lb)
Type RZ	255 PS (188 kW; 252 hp)	294 N⋅m (217 lbf⋅ft)	5-speed manual	1,230 kg (2,712 lb)
Type RB	255 PS (188 kW; 252 hp)	294 N⋅m (217 lbf⋅ft)	5-speed manual	1,260 kg (2,778 lb)
A-Spec	265 PS (195 kW; 261 hp)		5-speed manual	1,220 kg (2,690 lb)
EU-Spec	239 PS (176 kW; 236 hp)	294 N⋅m (217 lbf⋅ft)	5-speed manual	1,325 kg (2,921 lb)
Touring X	255 PS (188 kW; 252 hp)	294 N⋅m (217 lbf⋅ft)	4-speed automatic	1,330 kg (2,932 lb)

=== Series 6 (1992–1995) ===
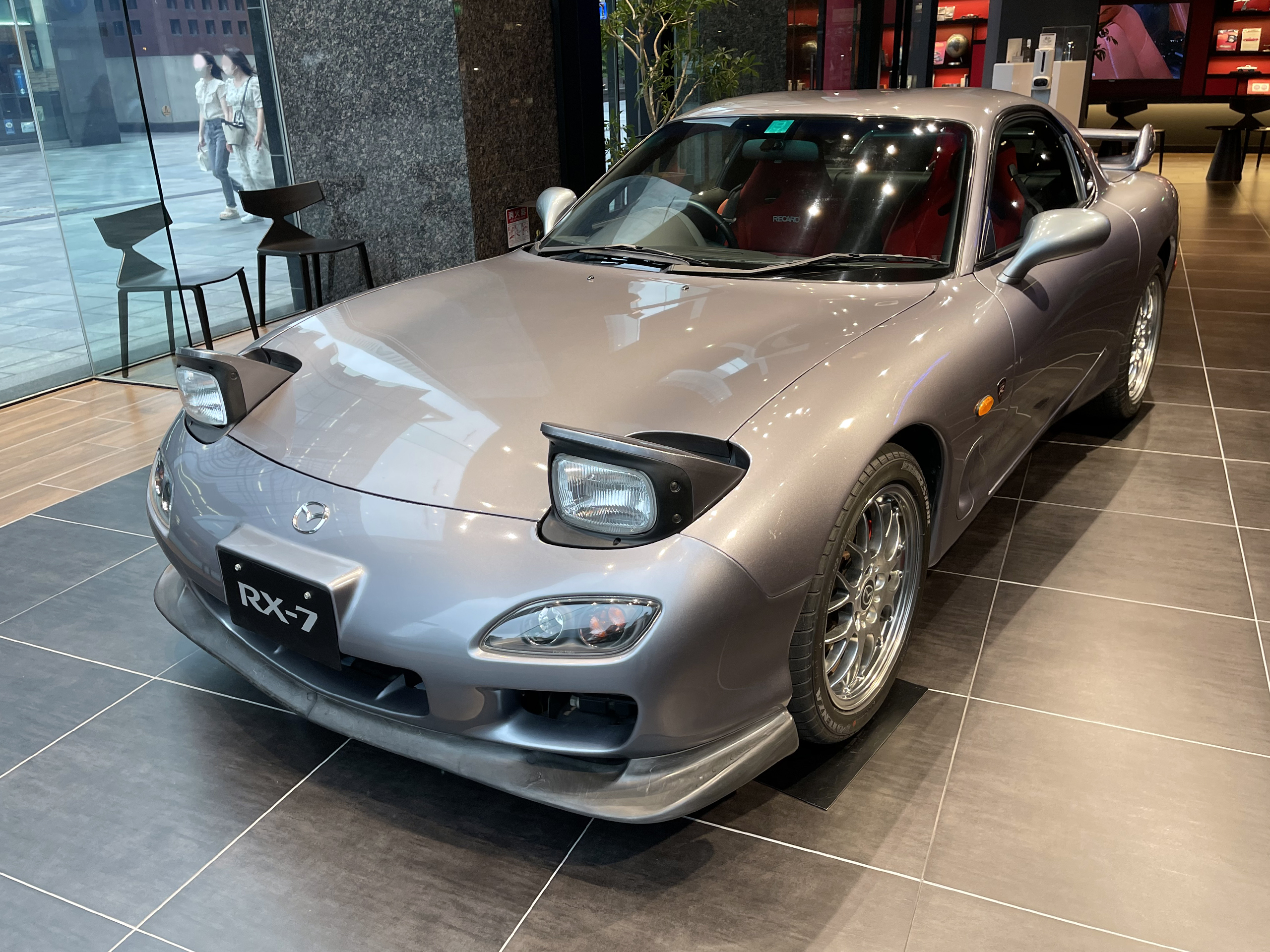
RX-7 Spirit R Type A with pop-up headlights raised

Series 6 was exported throughout the world and sold in larger numbers than in later years. In Japan, Mazda sold the RX-7 through its ɛ̃fini brand as the ɛ̃fini RX-7. Models in Japan included the Type S, the base model, Type R, the lightweight sports model, Type RZ, Type RB, A-spec and the Touring X, which came with a four-speed automatic transmission. The RX-7 was sold in 1993–1995 in the U.S. and Canada. The Series 6 was rated at 255 PS (188 kW; 252 hp) and 294 N⋅m (217 lb⋅ft).

==== North American market ====
At launch, three option packages were offered; the unlabeled base model, the Touring and the R1 (renamed R2 in 1994). All cars were only available as a two-seater, unlike the previous generation which offered a 2+2 configuration in North America. All cars were equipped with the same sequential twin-turbo 13B REW engine. A five-speed manual transmission was standard and a 4-speed automatic was available on the base model and Touring package. A driver-side airbag and anti-lock brakes are standard as well. The Touring package included a glass moonroof, fog lights, leather seats, a rear window wiper and a Bose Acoustic Wave music system with CD player. The R1 (R2 in 1994–95) model featured upgraded springs, Bilstein shocks, an additional engine oil cooler, an aerodynamics package comprising a front lip and rear wing, faux suede seats and Pirelli Z-rated tyres. Cruise control was deleted on the R1. The R2 differed from the R1 in that it had slightly softer suspension.

In 1994, the interior received a small update to include a passenger-side air bag, and a PEG (popular equipment group) package was offered. The PEG package featured leather seats, a rear cargo cover and a power steel sunroof. It did not include the fog lights or Bose stereo of the touring package. An automatic transmission was not available with the PEG.

In 1995, the Touring package was replaced by the PEP (popular equipment package). The PEP included a rear wing, leather seats, sunroof and fog lights, but did not have the Bose Stereo nor the rear window wiper. An estimated 500 RX-7s were produced for the 1995 model year. This would be the final year of RX-7 production for North America, as it was discontinued due to slow sales.

==== Australian market ====
A special high-performance version of the RX-7 was introduced in Australia in 1995, named the RX-7 SP. This model was developed to achieve homologation for racing in the Australian GT Production Car Series and the Eastern Creek 12 Hour production car race. An initial run of 25 cars were made, and later an extra 10 were built by Mazda due to demand. The RX-7 SP was rated at 277 PS (204 kW; 273 hp) and 357 N⋅m (263 lb⋅ft) of torque, a substantial increase over the standard model. Other changes included a race-developed carbon fiber nose cone and rear spoiler, a carbon fibre 120 L (32 US gal) fuel tank (as opposed to the 76 L (20 US gal) tank in the standard car), a 4.3:1 final drive ratio, 17-inch wheels, larger brake rotors and calipers. A "three times more efficient" intercooler, a new exhaust, and a modified ECU were also included. Weight was reduced significantly with the aid of further carbon fibre usage including lightweight vented bonnet and Recaro seats to reduce weight to 1,218 kg (2,685 lb) (from 1,250 kg (2,756 lb)), making this model a competitor to the Porsche 968 Club Sport for the final year Mazda officially entered. The formula paid off when the RX-7 SP won the 1995 Eastern Creek 12 Hour, giving Mazda the winning 12-hour trophy for a fourth straight year. The winning car also gained a podium finish at the international tarmac rally Targa Tasmania months later. A later special version, the Bathurst R, was introduced in 2001 to commemorate this victory in Japan only. It was based on the RX-7 Type R and 500 were built in total, featuring adjustable dampers, a carbon fibre shift knob, carbon fibre interior trim, special fog lamps and a different parking brake lever.

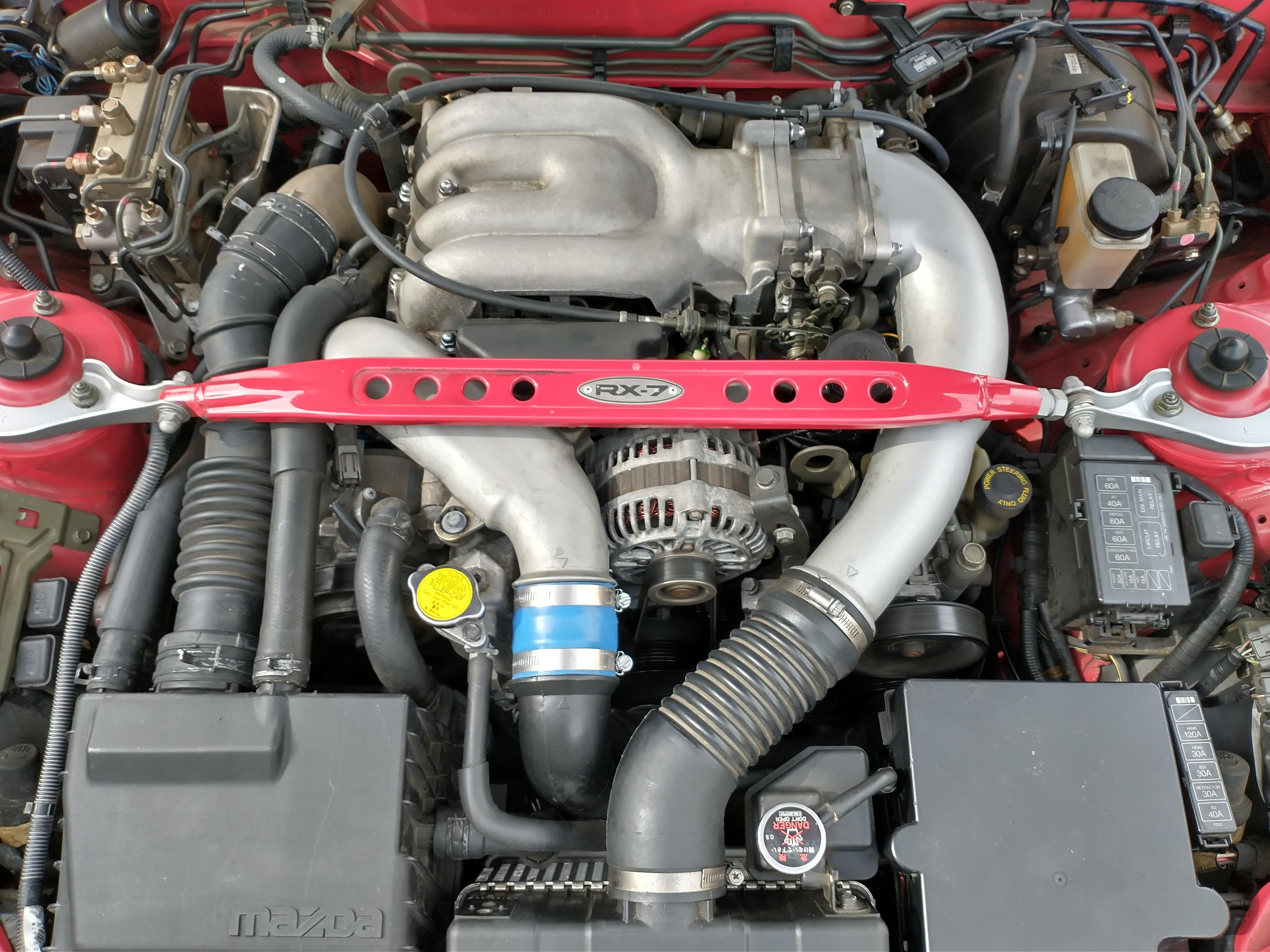
Mazda 13B-REW rotary engine

==== European market ====
In Europe, only 1,152 examples of the FD were sold through the official Mazda network, due to a high price and a fairly short time span. Only one model was available and it included twin oil-coolers, electric sunroof, cruise control and the rear storage bins in place of the back seats. It also has the stiffer suspension and strut braces from the R models. Germany topped the sales with 446 cars, while UK is second at 210 and Greece third with 168 (thanks to that country's tax structure which favored the rotary engine). The European models also received the 1994 interior facelift, with a passenger air bag. Sales in most of Europe ended after 1995 as it would have been too expensive to reengineer the car to meet the new Euro 2 emissions regulations.

===== United Kingdom =====
In the United Kingdom, for 1992, customers were offered only one version of the FD, which was based on a combination of the US touring and the base model. For the following year, in a bid to speed up sales, Mazda reduced the price of the RX-7 to £25,000, down from £32,000, and refunded the difference to those who bought the car before that was announced. From 1992 to 1995, only 210 FD RX-7s were officially sold in the UK. The FD continued to be imported to the UK until 1996. In 1998, for a car that had suffered from slow sales when it was officially sold, with a surge of interest and the benefit of a newly introduced SVA scheme, the FD would become so popular that there were more parallel and grey imported models brought into the country than Mazda UK had ever imported.

=== Series 7 (1996–1998) ===
Series 7 included minor changes to the car. Updates included a simplified vacuum routing manifold and a 16-bit ECU which combined with an improved intake system netted an extra 10 PS (7 kW). This additional horsepower was only available on manual transmission cars as the increase in power was only seen above 7,000 rpm, which was the redline for automatic transmission equipped cars. The rear spoiler and tail lights were also redesigned. The Type RZ model was now equipped with larger brake rotors as well as 17-inch BBS wheels. In Japan, the Series 7 RX-7 was marketed under the Mazda and ɛ̃fini brand name.

Series 7 RX-7s were also sold in Australia, New Zealand and the UK. Series 7 models were produced only with right-hand drive (RHD), and were only exported to RHD markets.

=== Series 8 (1998–2002) ===
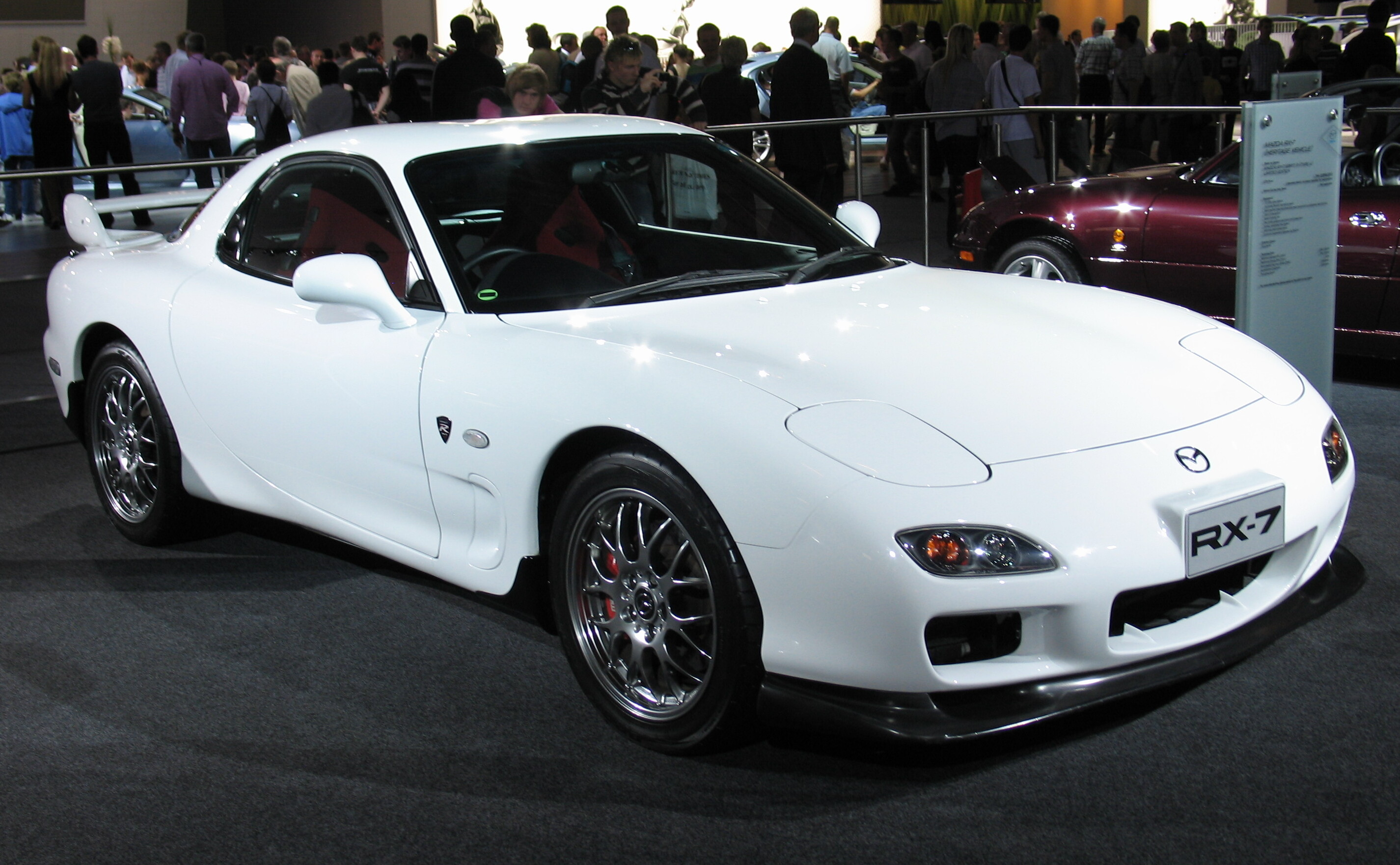
Mazda RX-7 Spirit R Type-A

Series 8 was the final series, and was only available in the Japanese market. More efficient turbochargers were available on certain models, while improved intercooling and radiator cooling was made possible by a redesigned front fascia with larger openings. The seats, steering wheel, and instrument cluster were all changed. The rear spoiler was modified and gained adjustability on certain models. Three horsepower levels are available: 255 PS (188 kW; 252 hp) for automatic transmission equipped cars, 265 PS (195 kW; 261 hp) for the Type RB, and 280 PS (206 kW; 276 hp) available on the top-of-the-line sporting models.

The high-end "Type RS" came equipped with Bilstein suspension and 17-inch wheels as standard equipment, and reduced weight to 1,280 kg (2,822 lb). Power was increased with the addition of a less restrictive muffler and more efficient turbochargers which featured abradable compressor seals. It produced 280 PS (206 kW; 276 hp) at 6,500 rpm and 314 N⋅m (232 lb⋅ft) of torque at 5,000 rpm as per the maximum Japanese limit. The Type RS had a brake upgrade by increasing rotor diameter front and rear to 314 mm (12.4 in) and front rotor thickness from 22 mm (0.9 in) to 32 mm (1.3 in). The Type RS version also sported a 4.30 final drive ratio, providing a significant reduction in its 0–100 km/h (62 mph) time. The gearbox was also modified; fifth gear was made longer to reduce cruising rpm and improve fuel efficiency. The very limited edition Type RZ version included all the features of the Type RS, but at a lighter weight, at 1,270 kg (2,800 lb). It also featured gun-metal coloured BBS wheels and a red racing themed interior. An improved ABS system worked by braking differently on each wheel, allowing the car better turning during braking.

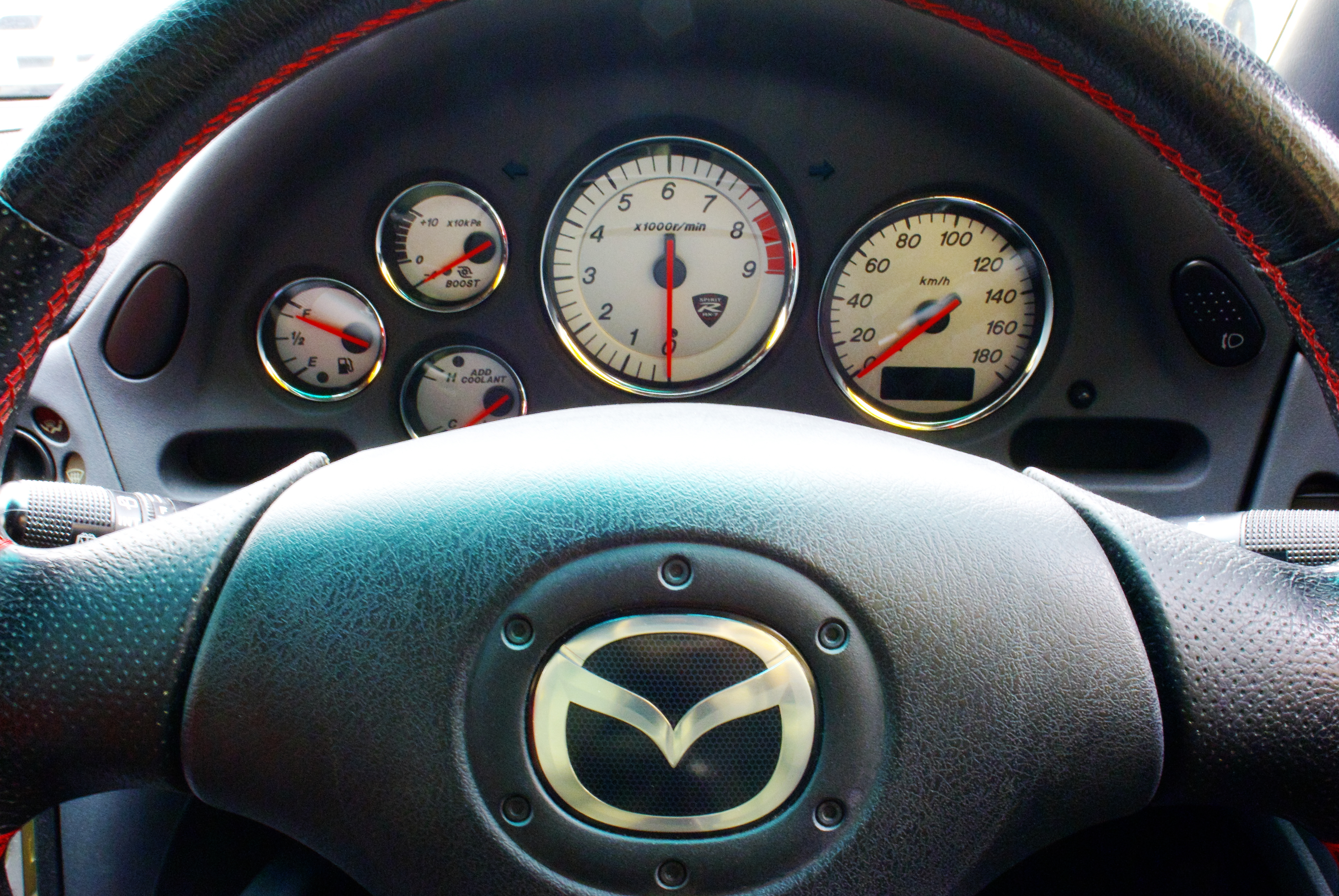
Instrument panel of an RX-7 Spirit R

One of the most collectible of all RX-7 models was the last model limited to 1,500 units. Dubbed the "Spirit R", they combined all the extra features Mazda had used on previous limited-run specials with new exclusive features like cross-drilled brake rotors. Sticker prices when new were 3,998,000 yen for Type-A and B and 3,398,000 yen for Type-C. Mazda's press release said "The Type-A Spirit R model is the ultimate RX-7, boasting the most outstanding driving performance in its history."

There are three models of "Spirit R": the "Type A", "Type B", and "Type C". The "Type A" is a two-seater with a five-speed manual transmission. It features lightweight red trim Recaro front seats as seen in the earlier RZ models. The "Type B" shares all features of the "Type A" but with a 2+2 seat configuration. The "Type C" is also a 2+2, but has a four-speed automatic transmission. Of the 1,504 Spirit R's made, 1,044 were Type A, 420 Type B and 40 Type C. An exclusive Spirit R paint colour, Titanium Grey, adorned 719 of the 1,504 cars produced.

In Japan, the FD3S production span is categorised into six models: #1 from 1991/12, #2 from 1993/08, #3 from 1995/03, #4 from 1996/01, #5 from 1998/12 and #6 from 2000/10. The model number (1 to 6) shows as the first digit of the six-characters-long JDM VIN; e.g., in VIN FD3S-ABCDEF, the A is the model number. A total of nine limited editions (type RZ in 1992/10 (300 cars), RZ 1993/10 (150), R-II Bathurst 1994/09 (350), R Bathurst X 1995/07 (777), RB Bathurst X 1997/01 (700), RS-R 1997/10 (500), RZ 2000/10 (325), R Bathurst R 2001/08 (650), Spirit R 2002/04 (1504)) and two special editions (Bathurst R 1995/02, R Bathurst 2001/12 (2174)) were produced.

Series 8 (1998–2002)
Model	Power	Torque	Gearbox	Weight	Seating	Brakes	Wheels	Tyres
Type RB	265 PS (195 kW; 261 hp)	294 N·m (217 lb·ft)	5-speed manual	1,310 kg (2,888 lb)	2+2	294 mm (11.6 in)	16x8.0JJ (front); 16x8.0JJ (rear)	225/50R16 92V(front); 225/50R16 92V(rear)
Type RB 4AT	255 PS (188 kW; 252 hp)	294 N·m (217 lb·ft)	4-speed automatic	1,340 kg (2,954 lb)	2+2	294 mm (11.6 in)	16x8.0JJ (front); 16x8.0JJ (rear)	225/50R16 92V(front); 225/50R16 92V(rear)
Type RB-S	265 PS (195 kW; 261 hp)	294 N·m (217 lb·ft)	5-speed manual	1,320 kg (2,888 lb)	2+2	294 mm (11.6 in)	16x8.0JJ (front); 16x8.0JJ (rear)	225/50ZR16 (front); 225/50ZR16 (rear)
Type R	280 PS (206 kW; 276 hp)	314 N·m (231 lb·ft)	5-speed manual	1,310 kg (2,888 lb)	2+2	294 mm (11.6 in)	16x8.0JJ (front); 16x8.0JJ (rear)	225/50ZR16 (front); 225/50ZR16 (rear)
Type R Bathurst	280 PS (206 kW; 276 hp)	314 N·m (231 lb·ft)	5-speed manual	1,280 kg (2,822 lb)	2+2	294 mm (11.6 in)	16x8.0JJ (front); 16x8.0JJ (rear)	225/50ZR16 (front); 225/50ZR16 (rear)
Type R Bathurst R	280 PS (206 kW; 276 hp)	314 N·m (231 lb·ft)	5-speed manual	1,280 kg (2,822 lb)	2+2	294 mm (11.6 in)	16x8.0JJ (front); 16x8.0JJ (rear)	225/50ZR16 (front); 225/50ZR16 (rear)
Type RS	280 PS (206 kW; 276 hp)	314 N·m (231 lb·ft)	5-speed manual	1,280 kg (2,822 lb)	2+2	314 mm (12.4 in)	17x8.0JJ (front); 17x8.5JJ (rear)	235/45R17 (front); 255/40R17 (rear)
Type RZ	280 PS (206 kW; 276 hp)	314 N·m (231 lb·ft)	5-speed manual	1,270 kg (2,800 lb)	2	314 mm (12.4 in)	17x8.0JJ (front); 17x8.5JJ (rear)	235/45R17 (front); 255/40R17 (rear)
Spirit R (Type A)	280 PS (206 kW; 276 hp)	314 N·m (231 lb·ft)	5-speed manual	1,270 kg (2,800 lb)	2	314 mm (12.4 in)	17x8.0JJ (front); 17x8.5JJ (rear)	235/45R17 (front); 255/40R17 (rear)
Spirit R (Type B)	280 PS (206 kW; 276 hp)	314 N·m (231 lb·ft)	5-speed manual	1,280 kg (2,822 lb)	2+2	314 mm (12.4 in)	17x8.0JJ (front); 17x8.5JJ (rear)	235/45R17 (front); 255/40R17 (rear)
Spirit R (Type C)	255 PS (188 kW; 252 hp)	314 N·m (231 lb·ft)	4-speed automatic	1,280 kg (2,822 lb)	2+2	294 mm (11.6 in)	17x8.0JJ (front); 17x8.5JJ (rear)	235/45R17 (front); 255/40R17 (rear)

== Reviews and awards ==
The RX-7 made Car and Driver magazine's Ten Best list five times (1983, 1987, 1993–1995).

In 2004, Sports Car International named the Series 3 car seventh on their list of Top Sports Cars of the 1970s. In 1983, the RX-7 would appear on Car and Driver magazine's Ten Best list for the first time in 20 years.

Though about 363 kg (800 lb) heavier and more insulated than its predecessor, the FC continued to win accolades from the press. The RX-7 FC was Motor Trend's Import Car of the Year for 1986, and the Turbo II was on Car and Driver magazine's 10 Best list for a second time in 1987.

The FD RX-7 was Motor Trend's Import Car of the Year for 1993. When Playboy first reviewed the FD RX-7 in 1993, they tested it in the same issue as the [then] new Dodge Viper. In that issue, Playboy declared the RX-7 to be the better of the two cars. It went on to win Playboy's Car of the Year for 1993.

The FD RX-7 also made Car and Driver's Ten Best list for 1993 through 1995 – all three years in which it was sold in the United States. In June 2007, Road & Track proclaimed: "The ace in Mazda's sleeve is the RX-7, a car once touted as the purest, most exhilarating sports car in the world." After its introduction in 1991, it won the Automotive Researchers' and Journalists' Conference Car of the Year award in Japan.

== Motorsport ==
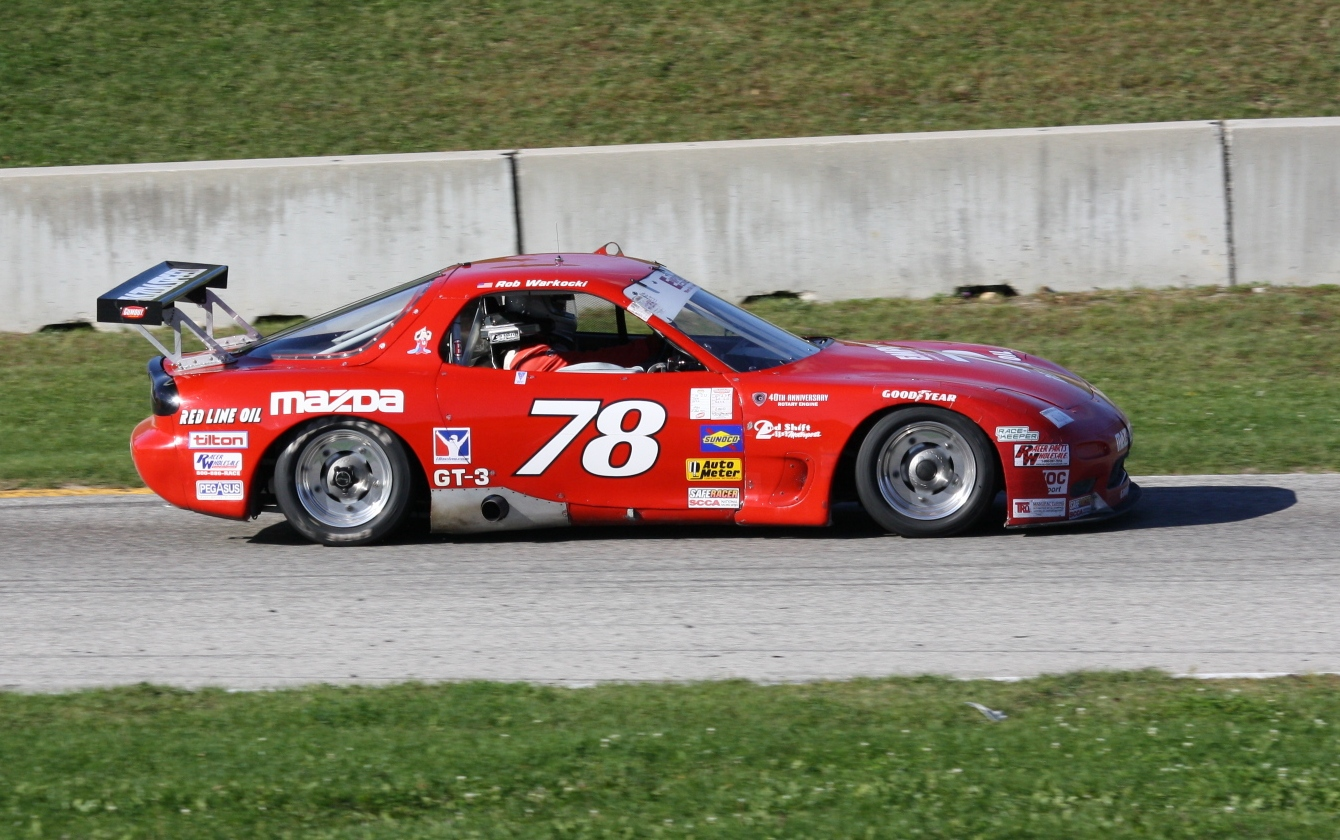
An RX-7 GT3 car, winner of the GT3 class at the 2010 SCCA National Championship Runoffs

Racing versions of the first-generation RX-7 were entered at the 24 hours of Le Mans endurance race. The first outing for the car, equipped with a 13B engine, failed by less than one second to qualify in 1979. The next year, a 12A-equipped RX-7 not only qualified, it placed 21st overall. That same car did not finish in 1981, along with two more 13B cars. Those two cars were back for 1982, with one 14th-place finish and another DNF. The RX-7 Le Mans effort was replaced by the 717C prototype for 1983.

Mazda began racing RX-7s in the IMSA GTU series in 1979. In its first year, RX-7s placed first and second at the 24 Hours of Daytona, and claimed the GTU series championship. The car continued winning, claiming the GTU championship seven years in a row. The RX-7 took the GTU championship ten years in a row from 1982, and the GTO Championship in 1991. In addition to this, a GTX version was developed, named the Mazda RX-7 GTP; this was unsuccessful, and the GTP version of the car was also unsuccessful. The RX-7 has won more IMSA races than any other car model. In the USA SCCA competition RX-7s were raced with great success by Don Kearney in the NE Division and John Finger in the SE Division. Pettit Racing won the GT2 Road Racing Championship in 1998. The car was a '93 Mazda RX-7 street car with only bolt-on accessories. At season end Pettit had 140 points—63 points more than the second place team. This same car finished the Daytona Rolex 24-hour race four times.

The RX-7 also fared well at the Spa 24 Hours race. Three Savanna/RX-7s were entered in 1981 by Tom Walkinshaw Racing. After hours of battling with several BMW 530is and Ford Capris, the RX-7 driven by Pierre Dieudonné and Tom Walkinshaw won the event. Mazda had turned the tables on BMW, who had beaten Mazda's Familia Rotary to the podium eleven years earlier at the same event. TWR's prepared RX-7s also won the British Touring Car Championship in 1980 and 1981, driven by Win Percy.

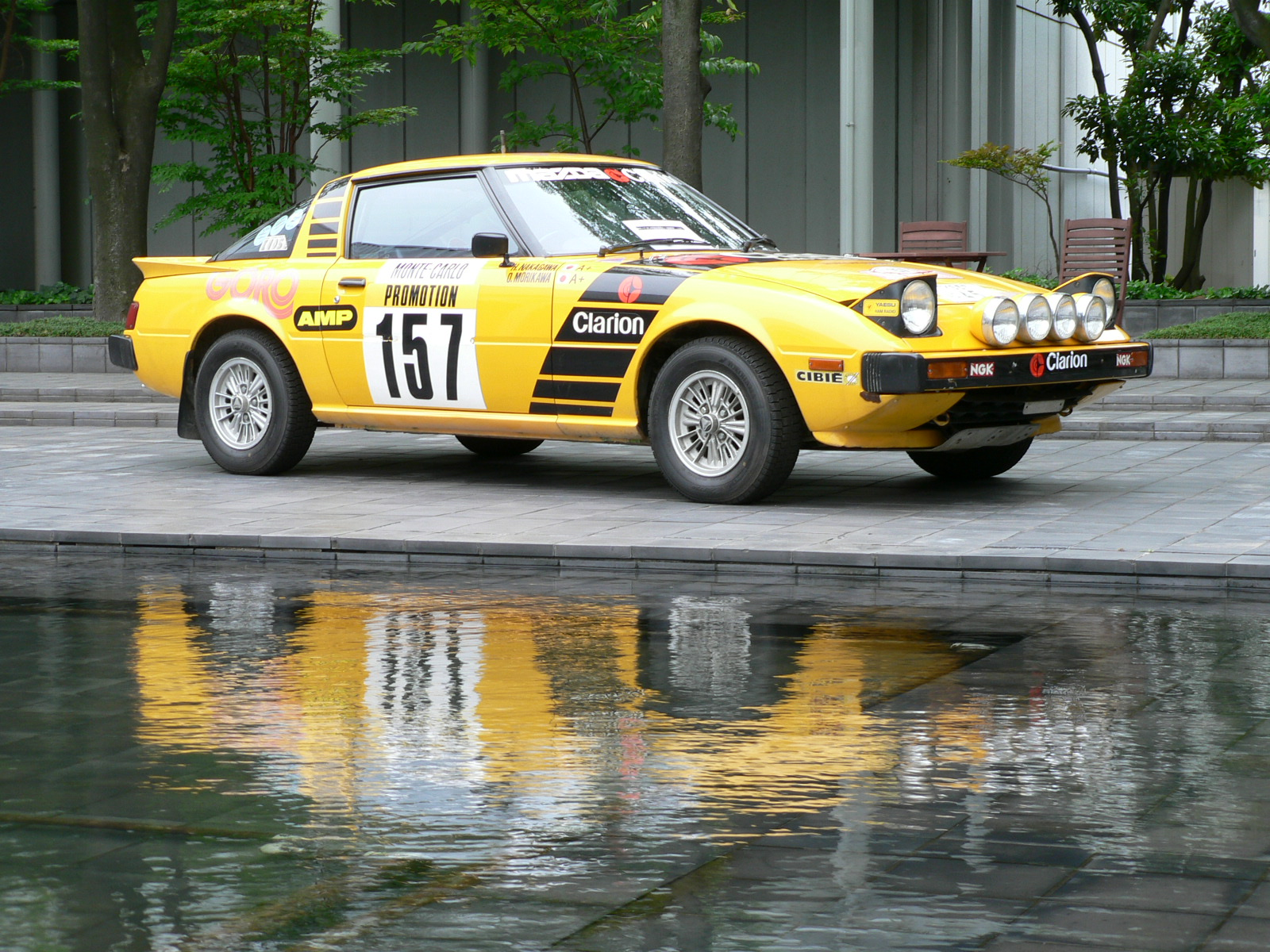
A Mazda RX-7 Group B rally car which competed in the 1979 Monte Carlo Rally

Canadian-born Australian touring car driver Allan Moffat was instrumental in bringing Mazda into the Australian touring car scene which ran to Group C regulations unique to Australia. Over a four-year span beginning in 1981, Moffat took the Mazda RX-7 to victory in the 1983 Australian Touring Car Championship, as well as a trio of Bathurst 1000 podiums, in 1981 (3rd with Derek Bell), 1983 (second with Yoshimi Katayama) and 1984 (third with former motorcycle champion Gregg Hansford). Privateer racer Peter McLeod drove his RX-7 to win the 1983 Australian Endurance Championship, while Moffat won the Endurance title in 1982 and 1984. Australia's adoption of international Group A regulations, combined with Mazda's reluctance to homologate a Group A RX-7 (meaning that a base number of 5,000 had to be built, plus another 500 "evolution" models), ended Mazda's active participation in Australian touring car racing at the end of the 1984 season. Plans had been in place to replace the RX-7 with a Mazda 929, but testing by Allan Moffat in late 1984 had indicated that the car would be uncompetitive and Mazda abandoned plans to race in Group A.

The RX-7 even made an appearance in the World Rally Championship. The car finished 11th on its debut at the RAC Rally in Wales in 1981. Group B received much of the focus for the first part of the 1980s, but Mazda did manage to place third at the 1985 Acropolis Rally, and when the Group B was folded, its Group A-based replacement, the 323 4WD claimed the victory at Swedish Rally in both 1987 and 1989.

=== IMSA Bridgestone Supercar Series ===
The third-generation Mazda RX-7 entered its first professional race in the world on February 23, 1992, at the Miami Grand Prix. The cars made it to the podium many times and won the IMSA Supercar race at Sebring in 1994. Peter Farrell Motorsport also fielded RX-7's in the IMSA Firestone Firehawk Endurance Series dominating many races and finishing runner up in the overall championship two years in a row.

== Revivals ==
Mazda has made several references to a revival of the RX-7 in various forms over the years since the RX-8 was discontinued. In November 2012, MX-5 program manager Nobuhiro Yamamoto indicated that Mazda was working on a 16X based RX-7, with 300 horsepower.

In October 2015, Mazda unveiled the RX-Vision concept car at the Tokyo Motor Show, powered by a new rotary engine and featured design cues reminiscent of the third generation RX-7. A production-ready concept could have followed suit by 2017, marking 50 years since the revealing of Mazda's first rotary-powered sports car, the Cosmo.

In October 2023, Mazda unveiled the Iconic SP concept car at the Japan Mobility Show, with a two-rotor rotary engine used as a power generator and also features design cues reminiscent of the third generation RX-7, most notably its pop-up headlights.

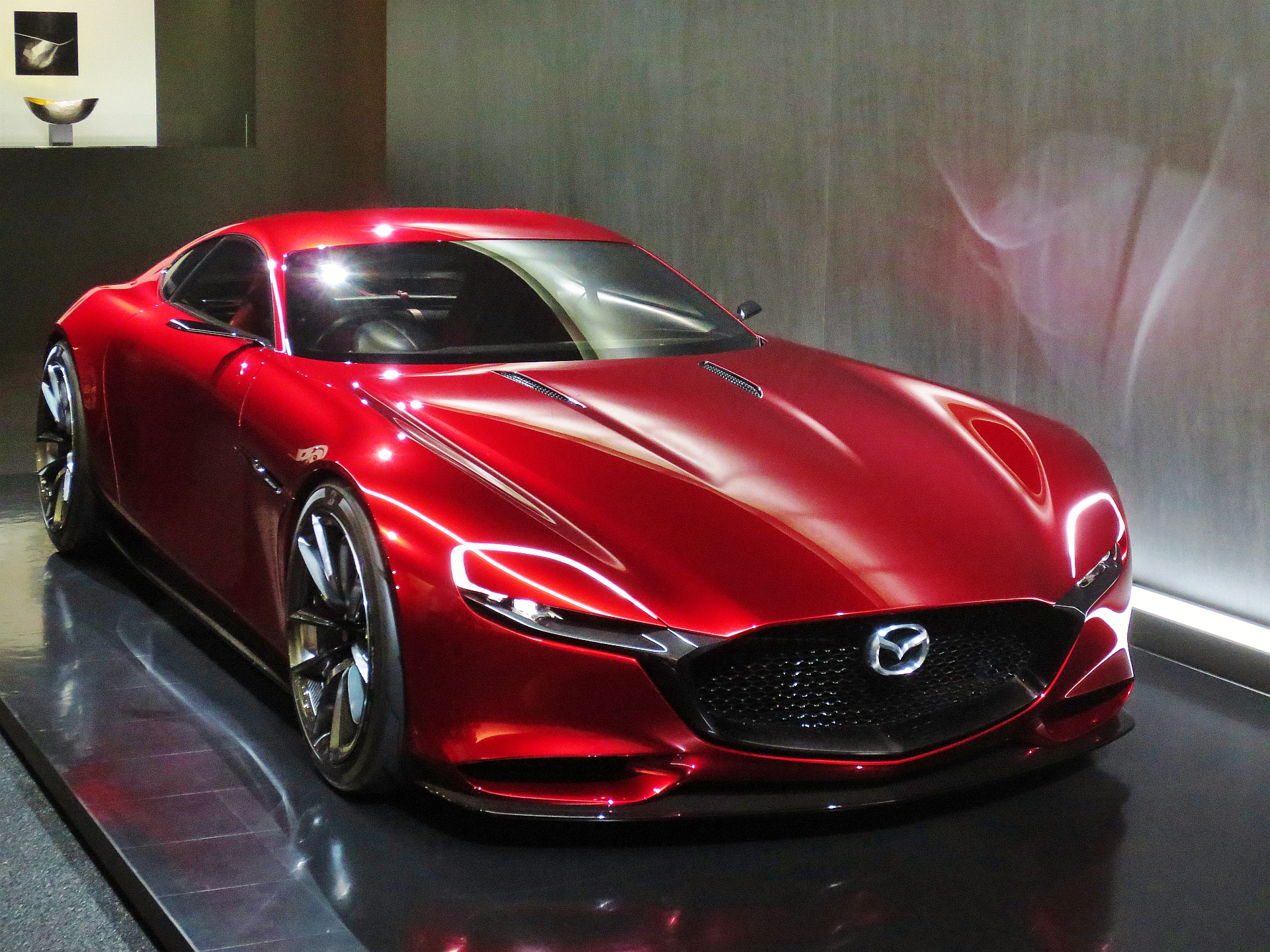
Mazda RX-Vision concept car

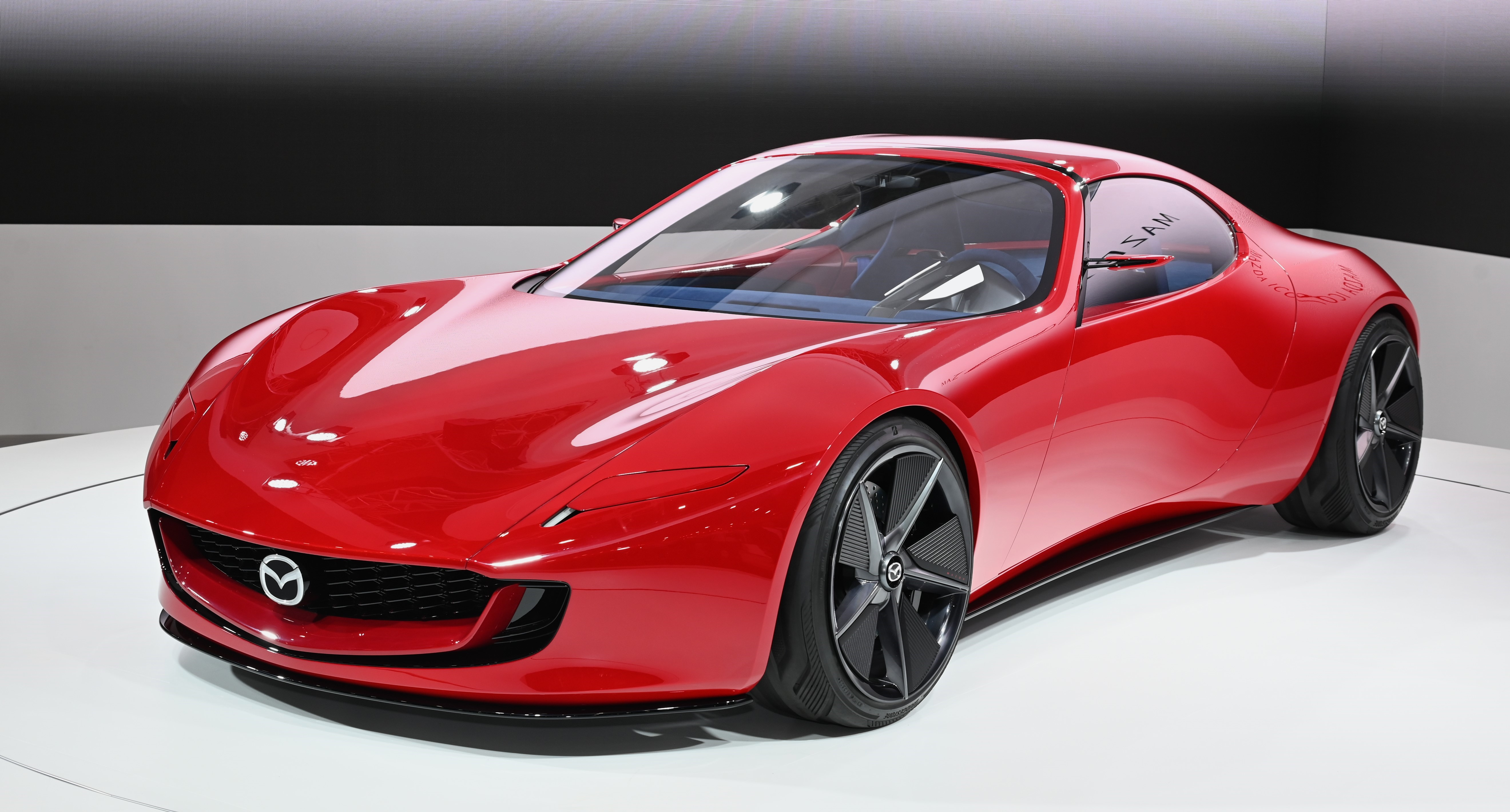
Mazda Iconic SP concept car
