= Lucé =

Lucé may refer to the following places in France:

- Clos Lucé, a mansion in Amboise, in Indre-et-Loire, region of Centre
- La Baroche-sous-Lucé, a commune in the Orne department in the region of Basse-Normandie
- Le Grand-Lucé, a commune in the Sarthe department in the region of Pays-de-la-Loire
- Lucé, Eure-et-Loir, a commune in the Eure-et-Loir department in the region of Centre
- Lucé, Orne, a commune in the Orne department in the region of Basse-Normandie
- Villaines-sous-Lucé, a commune in the Sarthe department in the region of Pays-de-la-Loire

== See also ==
- Luce (disambiguation)
- Lucia (disambiguation)
- Lúcia
- Lucie (disambiguation)
- Luci
- Lucey (disambiguation)
- Lucy (disambiguation)
