= Lucy (surname) =

Lucy is a surname. Notable people with the surname include:

== Notable male people with the name ==
- Charles Lucy (1814–1873), English historical painter of the Victorian era
- Con Lucy (1899–1929), Irish hurler and Gaelic footballer
- Donny Lucy (born 1982), American former MLB player
- Gary Lucy (born 1981), English actor, television personality, and model
- Sir Henry Lucy (1842–1924), English political journalist and humorist
- Jeffrey Lucy (born 1946), Australian former Chairman of the Australian Securities and Investments Commission
- Michael Lucy (1915–1971), Australian politician
- Richard Lucy, several people
- Seán Lucy (1931–2001), Irish poet and educator
- Thomas Lucy (disambiguation), several people
- William Lucy (disambiguation), several people

== Notable female people with the name ==
- Autherine Lucy (1929–2022), American activist; first black student to attend the University of Alabama
- Jemma Lucy (born 1988), British reality television series participant
- Judith Lucy (born 1968), Australian comedian, actress, author, and television- and radio presenter
- Julie Ashton-Lucy (born 1965), Australian international field hockey umpire
