= Luce =

Luce may refer to:

== People ==
- Luce (name), as a given name and a surname
- Luce (singer)

== Places ==
- Luče, a town in Slovenia
- Luce, Minnesota, an unincorporated community
- Luce Bay, a large Bay in Wigtownshire in southern Scotland
- Luce County, Michigan, a county in the U.S. state of Michigan
- Luce Township, Spencer County, Indiana
- New Luce, village in the Scottish unitary council area of Dumfries and Galloway
- Sainte-Luce, Martinique, a commune in the French overseas département of Martinique
- Sainte-Luce, Isère, a commune in the Isère department in south-eastern France
- Santa Luce, a commune in the Province of Pisa in the Italian region Tuscany
- Water of Luce, a river in Dumfries and Galloway, in south west Scotland

== Other ==
- Luce (band), a rock band from San Francisco
- Luce (film), a 2019 film
- Luce (mascot), the official mascot of the Roman Catholic 2025 Jubilee
- Luce (restaurant), a restaurant in Portland, Oregon
- "Luce (tramonti a nord est)", Italian singer Elisa's most famous song
- Istituto Luce, historic Italian film institute
- Esox lucius, a fish of the northern hemisphere, also known as Pike or Luce
- Luce's choice axiom, an axiom in probability theory
- Luce Hall, the first, purpose-built building for the U.S. Naval War College, in Newport, Rhode Island
- USS Luce, various United States Navy ships
- Luce–Celler Act of 1946, a United States law regarding immigration and naturalization of Filipinos and Indians from Asia
- Ferrari Luce, a battery electric executive car
- Mazda Luce, a Japanese luxury vehicle

== See also ==
- Lucé (disambiguation)
- Luče (disambiguation)
- Luci
- Lucia (disambiguation)
- Lucie (disambiguation)
- Lucy (disambiguation)
- Lucey (disambiguation)
- Luzi
