= Luče (disambiguation) =

Luče may refer to:

- Luče, a town and a municipality in Slovenia
- Luče, Grosuplje, a village in the Grosuplje municipality in central Slovenia

== See also ==
- Lucé (disambiguation)
- Luce (disambiguation)
- Luke (disambiguation)
