= Lucey (disambiguation) =

Lucey is a surname.

Lucey may also refer to the following places in France:

- Lucey, Côte-d'Or, France
- Lucey, Meurthe-et-Moselle, France
- Lucey, Savoie, France

== See also ==
- Lucy (disambiguation)
- Luci (disambiguation)
- Lucie (disambiguation)
