= Luci (disambiguation) =

Luci is a given name and a family name.

Luci may also refer to:

- Lunar Ultraviolet Cosmic Imager, a planned lunar-based telescope
- LuCI, a web-based interface for the OpenWrt router operating system
- LUCI, the near-infrared instrument for the Large Binocular Telescope
- Paranitocris luci, a species of beetle in the family Cerambycidae
- Luci Island, Xiuyu District, Putian, Fujian, China

== See also ==
- Lusi (disambiguation)
- Lucy (disambiguation)
- Luce (disambiguation)
- Lucie (disambiguation)
- Luciana (disambiguation)
- Lucifer (disambiguation)
