= Lucy (disambiguation) =

Lucy is a feminine given name.

Lucy may also refer to:

== Science ==
- Lucy (Australopithecus), a 3.2-million-year-old fossilized hominid
- Lucy (chimpanzee) (1964-1987), known for having been taught American sign language
- Lucy, a robot baby orangutan which was the subject of an artificial life experiment by Steve Grand
- Nickname of BPM 37093, a white dwarf star
- Lucy (spacecraft), a NASA space probe launched in 2021 to explore the Trojan asteroids

== Music ==
=== Albums ===
- Lucy (Candlebox album), 1995
- Lucy (Maaya Sakamoto album), 2001
- Lucy (Lucy Wainwright Roche album)

=== Bands ===
- Lucy (English band), a pre-Def Leppard band of guitarist Phil Collen
- Lucy (South Korean band)
- Lucy, a Japanese rock band formed by Imai Hisashi in 2004

=== Instruments ===
- Lucy (George Harrison guitar), owned at various times by John Sebastian, Rick Derringer, Eric Clapton and George Harrison
- Lucy (Albert King guitar), any of three guitars played by the blues guitarist

=== Songs ===
- "Lucy" (Alliage song)
- "Lucy" (Tom Dice song)
- "Lucy" (The Divine Comedy song)
- "Lucy" (Julian Lennon and James Scott Cook song)
- "Lucy" (Skillet song)
- "Lucy" (Soccer Mommy song)
- "Lucy" (Anna Tsuchiya song)
- "Lucy", by Candlebox on the album Lucy
- "Lucy", by Nick Cave on the album The Good Son
- "Lucy", by the American band Hanson
- "Lucy", by Hanne Hukkelberg on the soundtrack The Chronicles of Narnia: Prince Caspian
- "Lucy", by Holly Humberstone on the album Cruel World
- "Lucy", by Adam Lambert on the album The Original High
- "Lucy", a song by Sharon Needles from Taxidermy
- "Lucy", by Pepper on the album Pink Crustaceans and Good Vibrations
- "Lucy", by Y&T on the album Ten
- "Lucy", on The Buzz on Maggie

== In fiction ==
- Lucy (novel) (1990), by Jamaica Kincaid – a West Indian au pair in America
- Lucy (2003 film), a TV biopic about Lucille Ball
- Lucy (2006 film), a German drama film about a young mother
- Lucy (2014 film), by Luc Besson starring Scarlett Johansson
- The Lucy poems, composed by the English Romantic poet William Wordsworth
- Lucy, the Daughter of the Devil, an animated television show
- Lucy van Pelt, a character in the comic strip Peanuts
- "Lucy" (Not Going Out), a 2014 television episode
- "Lucy", an episode of the television series The Returned

== Places ==
=== France ===
- Lucy, Moselle, in the Moselle department
- Lucy, Seine-Maritime, in the Seine-Maritime department
- Lucy-le-Bocage, in the Aisne department
- Lucy-le-Bois, in the Yonne department
- Lucy-sur-Cure, in the Yonne department
- Lucy-sur-Yonne, in the Yonne department
- Montmort-Lucy, in Marne department

=== United States ===
- Lake Lucy, a lake in Minnesota
- Lucy, Alabama

== Animals ==
- Lucy (dog), on the children's television show Blue Peter
- In heraldry, the Esox, of which the northern pike is a member

== Ships ==
- SS Lucy, a Costa Rican coaster in service 1953-60
- Lucy (barge), a sailing barge built in 1922

== Other uses ==
- Loosie, a single cigarette
- Lucy (surname)
- Lucy Activewear, a women's activewear company
- The Lucy spy ring, a World War II espionage operation
- Lucy, a codeword for LSD
- Lucy, a doll in the Betty Spaghetty series
- Lucy the Elephant, an elephant-shaped building in Margate City, New Jersey
- Lucy, a member of the South Korean girl group Weki Meki

== See also ==
- Lucey (disambiguation)
- Luce (disambiguation)
- Lucie (disambiguation)
- Luci (disambiguation)
- Lucille (disambiguation)
- Lusi (disambiguation)
