= Mazda Luce =

Executive car produced by Mazda (1966–1991)

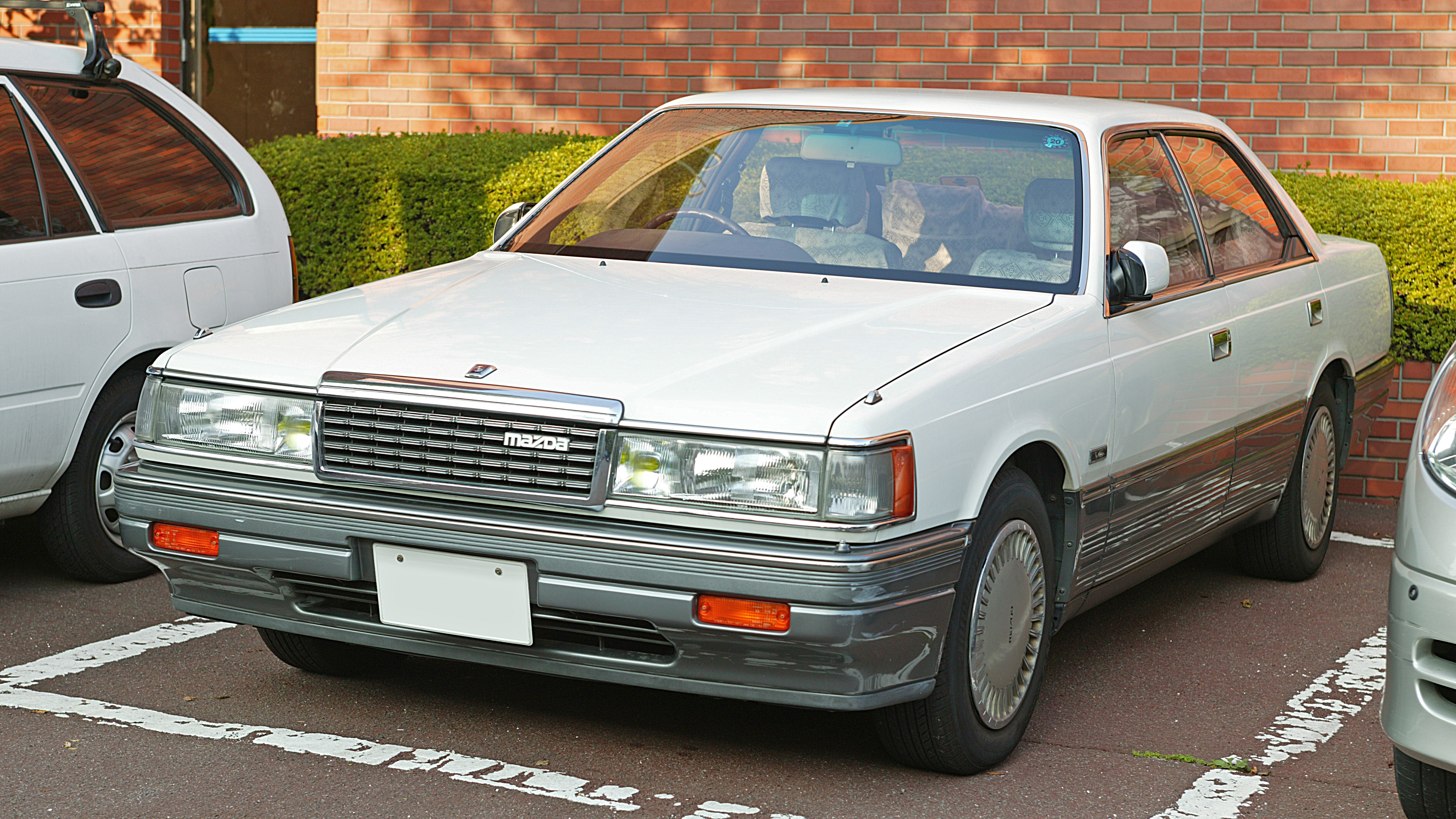

Overview
- Manufacturer: Mazda
- Also called: Mazda 929 (export markets)
- Production: 1966–1991
- Assembly: Japan: Hiroshima Assembly, Hiroshima

Body and chassis
- Class: Executive car
- Layout: FR layout

Chronology
- Successor: Mazda Sentia

The Mazda Luce (Japanese: マツダ・ルーチェ, Hepburn: Matsuda Rūche) is an executive car that was produced by Mazda in Japan from 1966 until 1991. It was widely exported as the Mazda 929 from 1973 to 1991 as Mazda's largest sedan. Later generations were installed with luxury items and interiors as the Luce became the flagship offering. In 1991, the Luce was replaced by the Sentia, which was also exported under the 929 nameplate.

== Etymology ==
The name "lu'ce" was taken from the Italian word for "light".

== SU/SV series (1966–1973) ==
SU/SV
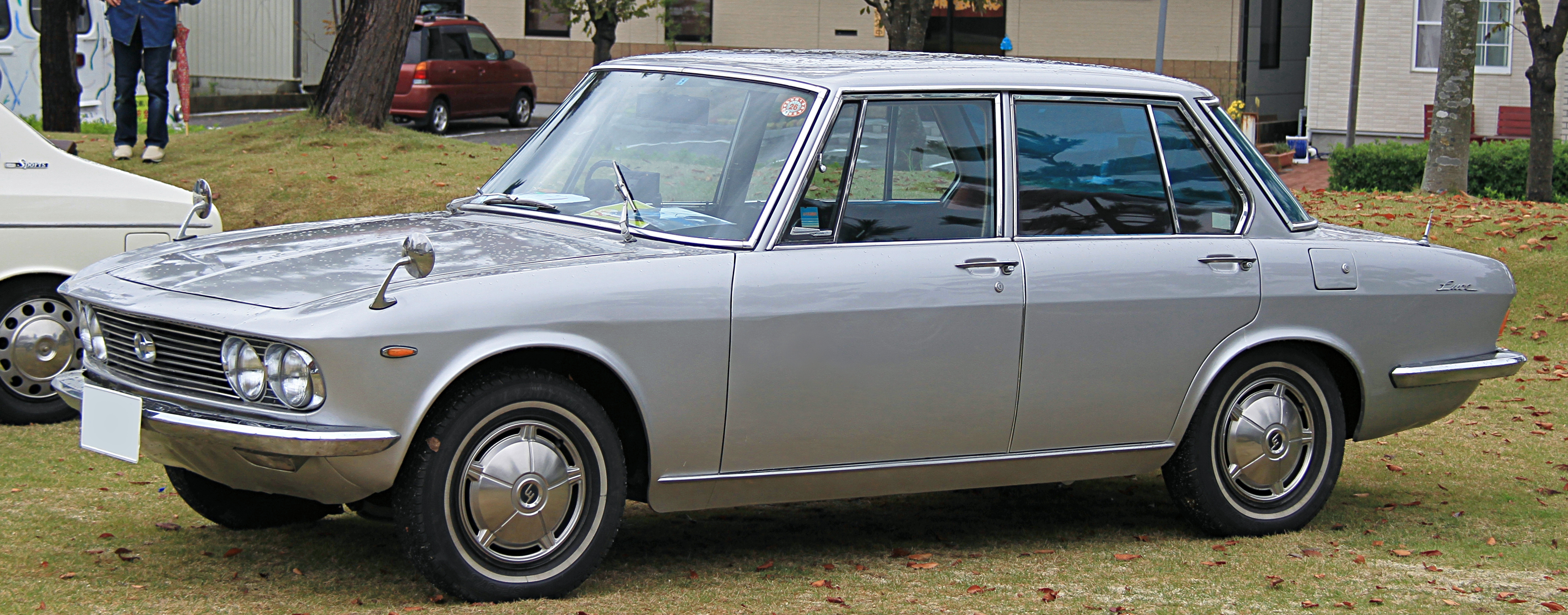
- 1966 1500 Deluxe (Japan)

Overview
- Model code: SU/SV
- Also called: Mazda 1500; Mazda 1800; Mazda R130
- Production: July 1966 – March 1973 (1500); October 1968 – March 1973 (1800); 1969–1972 (R130)
- Assembly: Japan: Hiroshima Assembly, Hiroshima; Sri Lanka: Homagama (UMC Mazda)

Body and chassis
- Body style: 2-door coupé (R130); 4-door sedan; 5-door station wagon
- Layout: FR layout

Powertrain
- Engine: 1.5 L UB I4 (1500, "SUA"); 1.8 L VB I4 (1800, "SVA"); 1.3 L 13A Wankel engine (R130)
- Transmission: 4-speed manual; 3-speed automatic

Dimensions
- Wheelbase: 2,500 mm (98.4 in) sedan
- Length: 4,370 mm (172.0 in) sedan
- Width: 1,630 mm (64.2 in) sedan
- Height: 1,430 mm (56.3 in) sedan
- Curb weight: 1,070 kg (2,359 lb) sedan

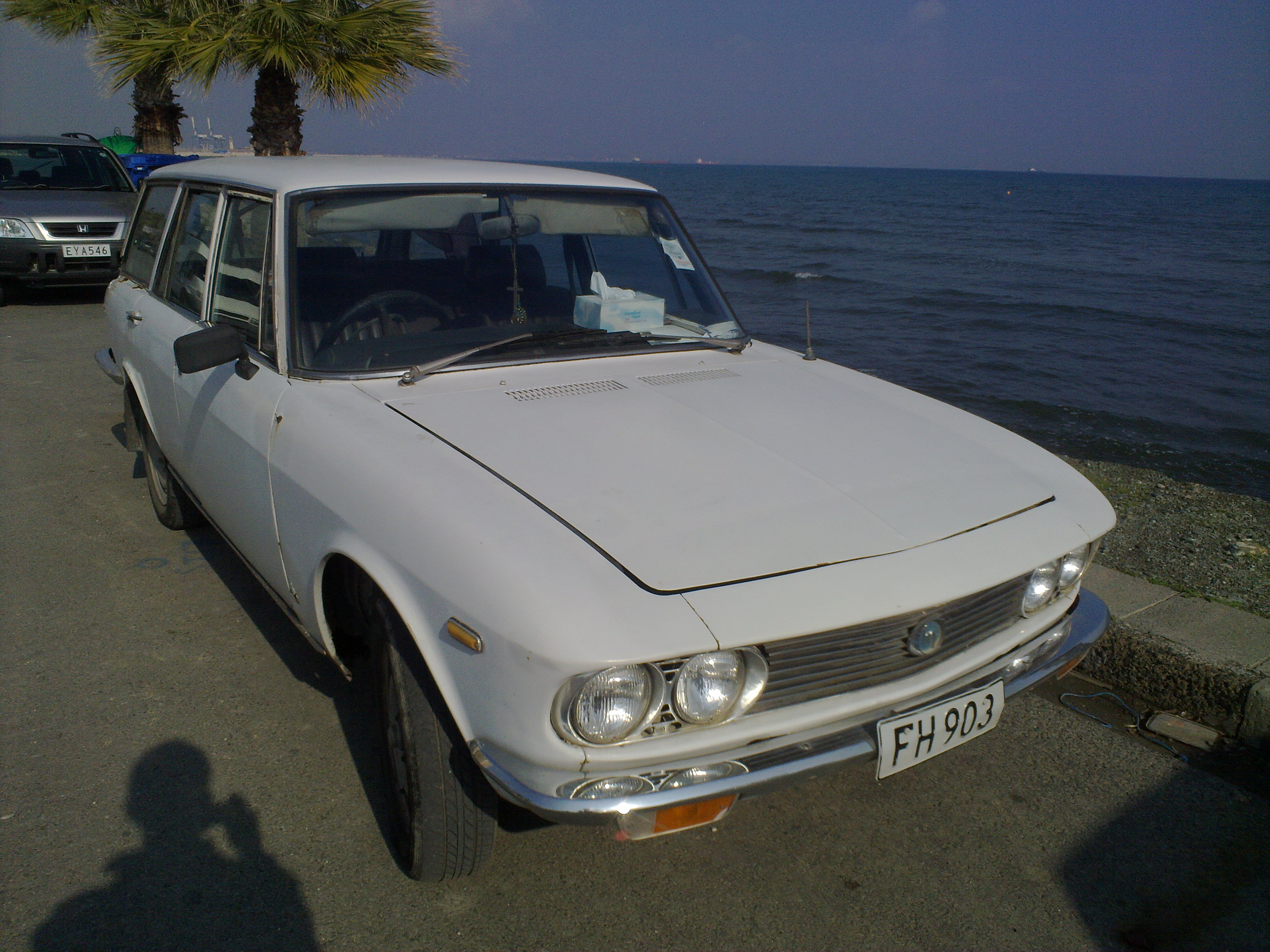
Mazda Luce wagon

Following an agreement signed with Bertone in April 1962, the 1965 Luce 1500 show car was designed by Giorgetto Giugiaro of Italy. It was low and sharp, looking more like a contemporary BMW Bavaria than its smaller Mazda companion models, the Familia and the kei car Carol.

The production version (SUA), started production in July 1966 and launched in August, had a higher roofline but retained the BMW-esque look. It was a front-engine, rear-wheel-drive four-door sedan, and featured a square 1490 cc 1500 SOHC engine, producing 78 PS (57 kW) at 5500 rpm and 114.6 N⋅m (84.5 lb⋅ft). It sold poorly at ¥695,000. The 1500 SS version with twin carburettors was introduced in June 1967, producing 86 PS (63 kW) at 5500 rpm and 117.8 N⋅m (86.9 lb⋅ft) at 5500 rpm. A stroked 1.8-liter (1796 cc) 1800 engine was added in December 1968. This new model, the Luce 1800, produced 104 PS (76 kW) at 5500 rpm and 152 N⋅m (112 lb⋅ft) at 2500 rpm. To accommodate the taller 1800 engine the bonnet on this model has a slight bump in the middle with an air inlet on the leading edge.

An estate (station wagon) was also added in April 1967, with the same engine as the sedan (SUAV). Unlike most commercial vehicles at the time, it was also available with a three-speed automatic transmission.

=== 1500/1800 ===
The Luce Mark I was sold in Australia and most other export markets under the names "Mazda 1500" and "Mazda 1800". Mazda considered assembling the Luce in South Africa and brought in 50 examples for evaluation and company use in 1967, but they instead chose to focus on the 1200 (Familia) and compact pickup trucks.

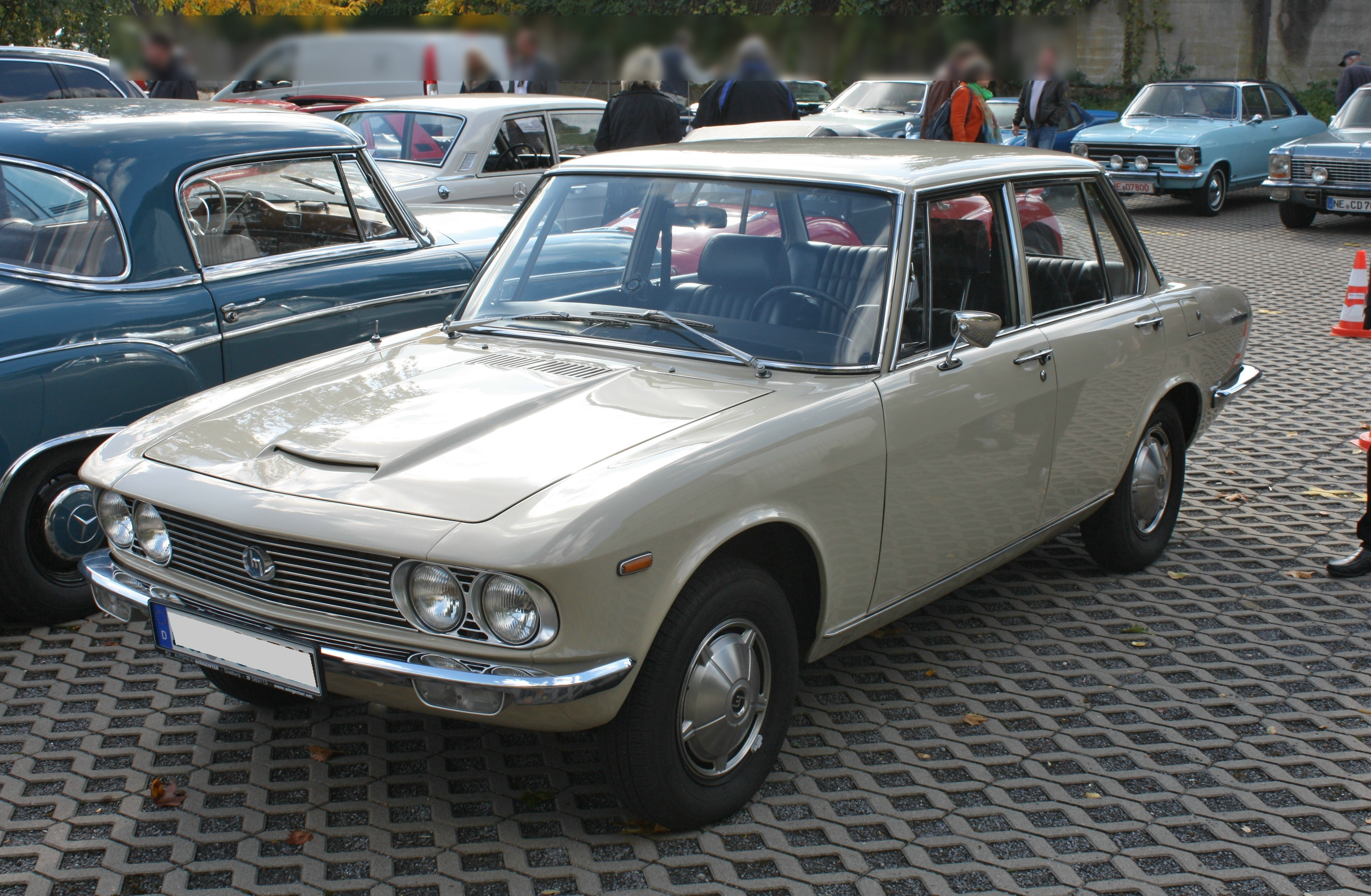
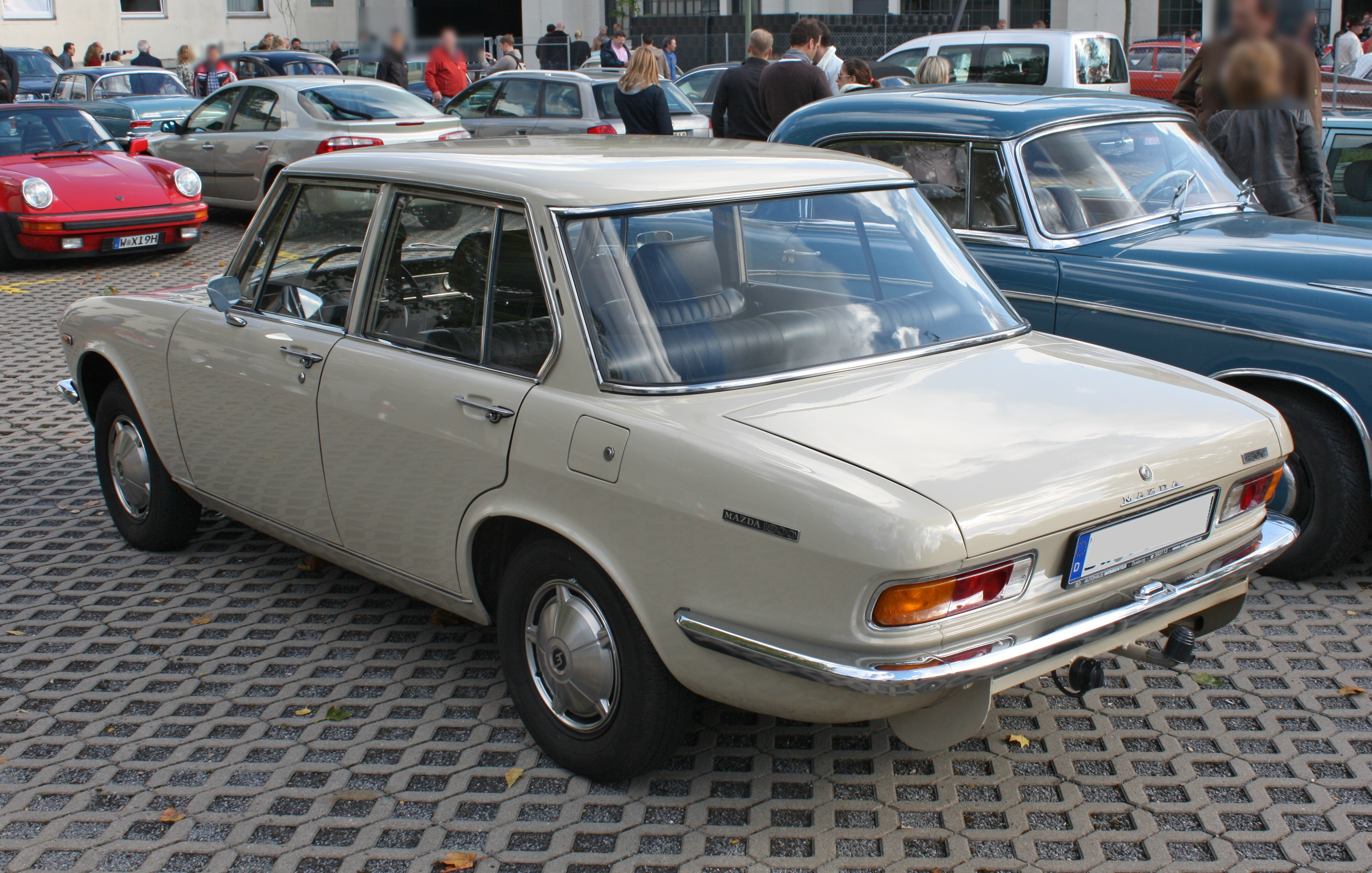
Mazda 1800 sedan

The Mazda brand entered the United States market in 1970 with just the small R100, but expanded to a full line in 1971. This included all three of the company's piston-powered models, the compact 1200, mid-size 616, and full-size 1800.

The US-market 1800 produced 98 hp (99 PS; 73 kW) and 146 N⋅m (108 lb⋅ft) and cost US$2,280. Performance with the three-speed automatic transmission was sluggish, with a 0 to 60 mph (0 to 97 km/h) time of 17.5 seconds and a 20.5 seconds and 105 km/h (65 mph) quarter-mile. Unlike the rotary cars, the 1800 was a flop. Road & Track magazine said it was solid to the point of being overly heavy, with pleasant handling but poor performance. It was gone from the market for 1972.

Opposite to what happened in the US, in Europe the 1800 was considered as having a better performance with 104 PS (76 kW) at 5500 rpm (SAE) and maximum torque of 148 N⋅m (109 lb⋅ft) at 3000 rpm (SAE), for a 0 to 60 mph (0 to 97 km/h) time of 13.4 seconds. The poor performance of this engine in USA was probably due to fact that in USA, the gasoline had an octane index of only 85 RON, while in Europe, the gasoline at the time had an octane index of 95 RON (up to 100 RON today). Also the manual transmission with four gears used in Europe contributed to a much better performance than the three-speed automatic transmission usually used in the US. The 1800 (fitted with a manual transmission) also sold in small numbers in Australia.

The number of Mazda 1800 automobiles imported into the US are as follows.

- 1970 – 1,058 sedans, 937 wagons
- 1971 – 1,020 sedans, 1,639 wagons
- 1972 – 100 sedans, 0 wagons

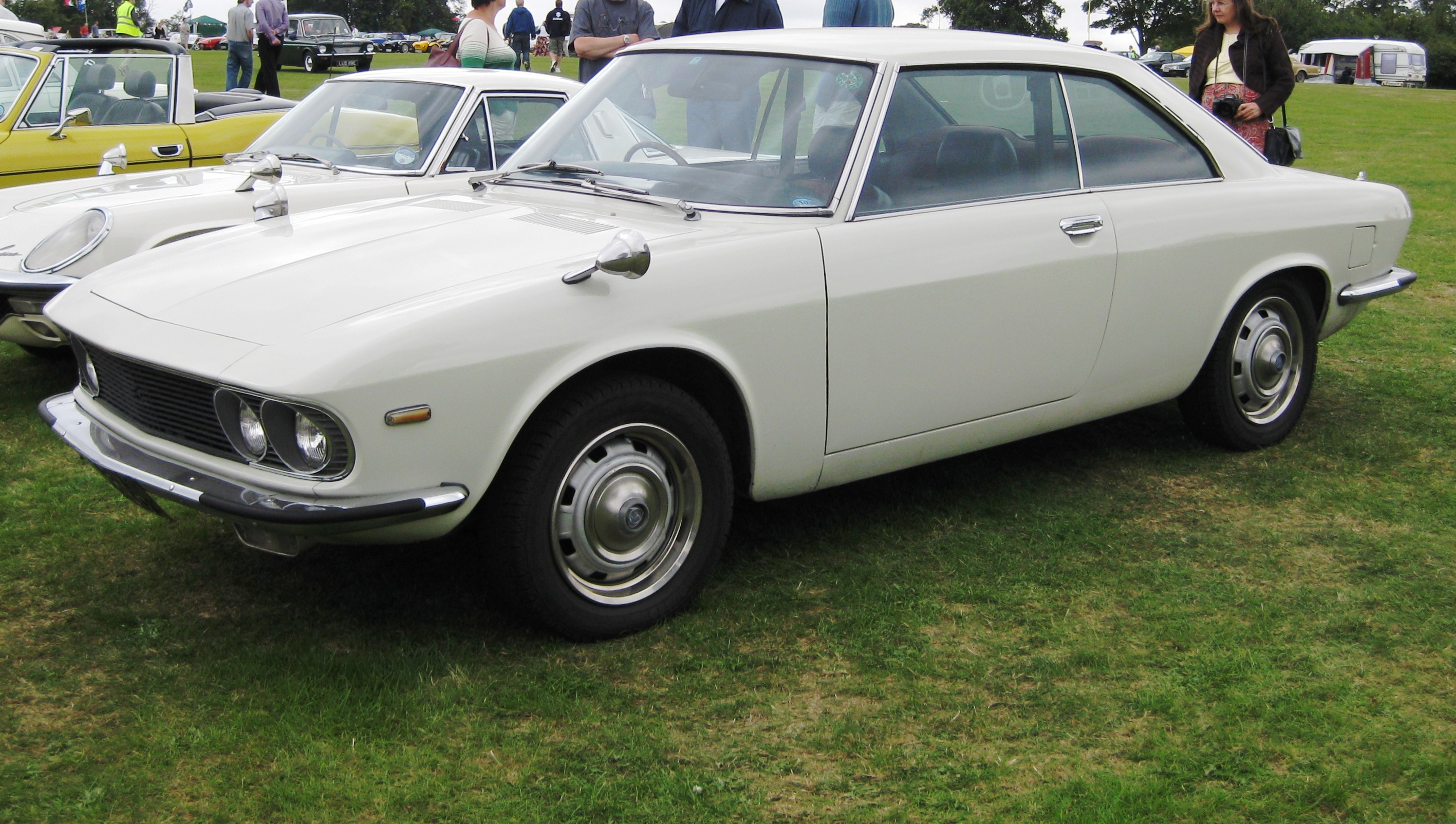
1969 Mazda Luce R130 coupe

The 1800 four-door sedan (model SVA) was produced from October 1968 through March 1973 where a reported 39,401 units were made. An 1800 station wagon version (model SVAV) was added in 1968, lasting until 1970.

=== R130 ===
A rotary-powered Luce appeared in 1969. The Luce R130 was produced from October 1969 to 1972. It used a 1.3-liter 13A engine, which produced 126 PS (93 kW; 124 hp) and 17.5 kg⋅m (172 N⋅m; 127 lb⋅ft). Quarter-mile (400 meters) performance was 16.9 seconds. This model was styled by Giorgetto Giugiaro, then working for Bertone, as a front-wheel-drive two-door coupé with front disc brakes, which was similar to the NSU Ro 80. This model, Mazda's only front-wheel-drive rotary (until the MX-30 R-EV), is now a collector's item and very rare. Less than 1,000 were built.

== LA2/LA3 series (1972–1977) ==
LA2/LA3
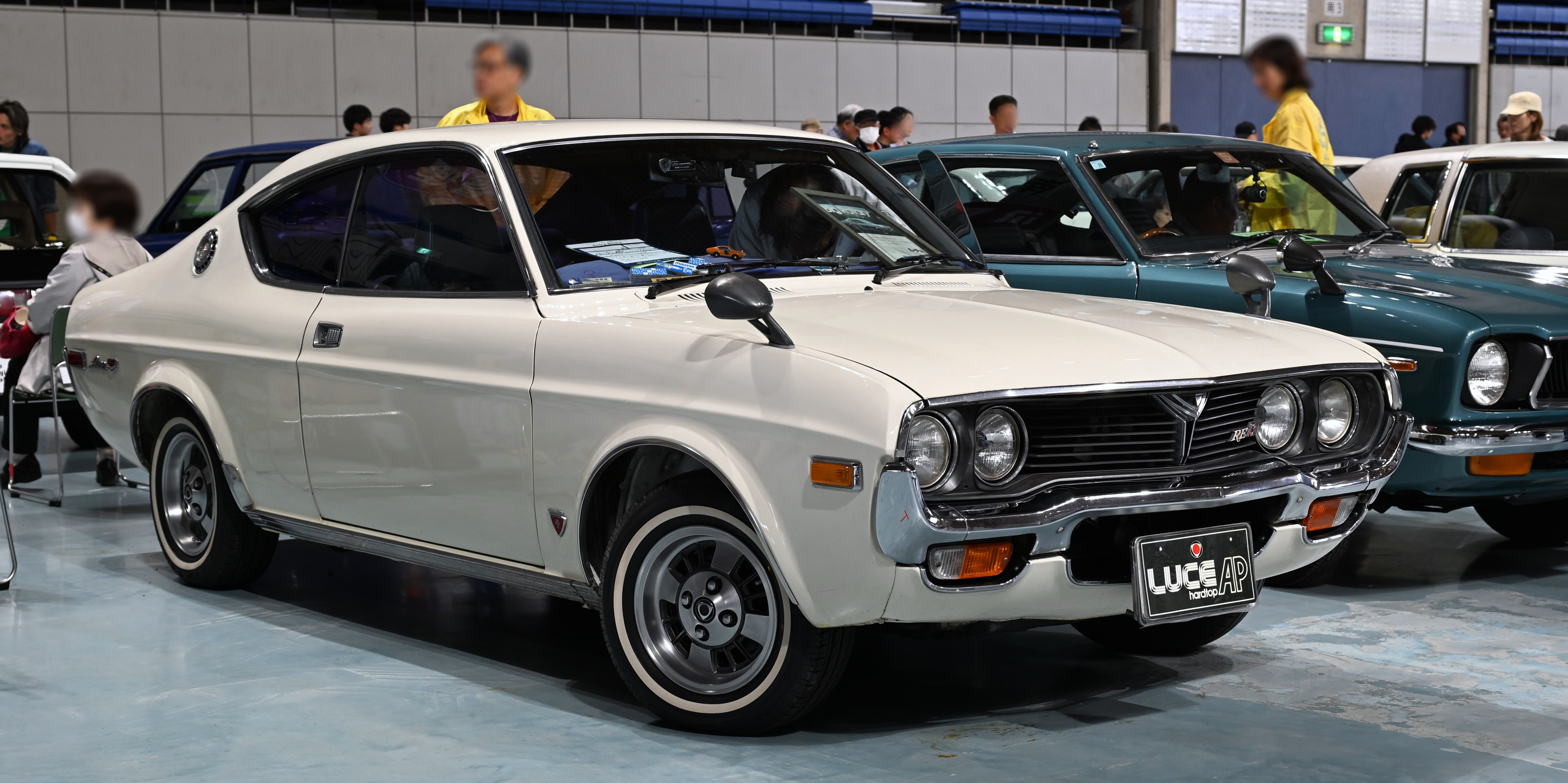
- 1975 Mazda Luce AP Gran Turismo (LA33S, facelift)

Overview
- Model code: LA2/LA3
- Also called: Mazda 929; Mazda RX-4
- Production: 1972–1977 (sedan); 1972–1978 (coupe); 1973–1979 (wagon)
- Assembly: Japan; Indonesia

Body and chassis
- Body style: 2-door coupé; 4-door sedan; 5-door station wagon
- Layout: FR layout

Powertrain
- Engine: 1769 cc VC I4 (LA2V); 1.2 L 12A Wankel (LA22); 1.3 L 13B Wankel
- Transmission: 4/5-speed manual; 3-speed Jatco 3N71B automatic

Dimensions
- Wheelbase: 2,510 mm (98.8 in) sedan
- Length: 4,240 mm (166.9 in) Formal sedan; 4,325 mm (170.3 in) Custom sedan, hardtop; 4,405 mm (173.4 in) Wagon; 4,400–4,540 mm (173.2–178.7 in) (LA3)
- Width: 1,660 mm (65.4 in)
- Height: 1,410 mm (55.5 in) sedan
- Curb weight: 1,060 kg (2,337 lb) sedan

Mazda released a second generation LA2 series Luce in November 1972—a rotary powered model that would be later exported as the Mazda RX-4. The conventionally-engined Luce sedan (LA2VS) would not arrive to the Japanese market until April 1973, after starting production in March. It was available as a hardtop (coupé), "formal sedan", "custom sedan", and as a station wagon which was also sold as a van in the domestic Japanese market. The original hardtop coupé received a longer, more aggressive front design, which was also installed on the custom sedan. The formal sedan and the van/wagon received a somewhat shorter front end which was also used on the export versions (929). For the facelifted LA3 model from 1976, only one front design was used—one with a more square design.

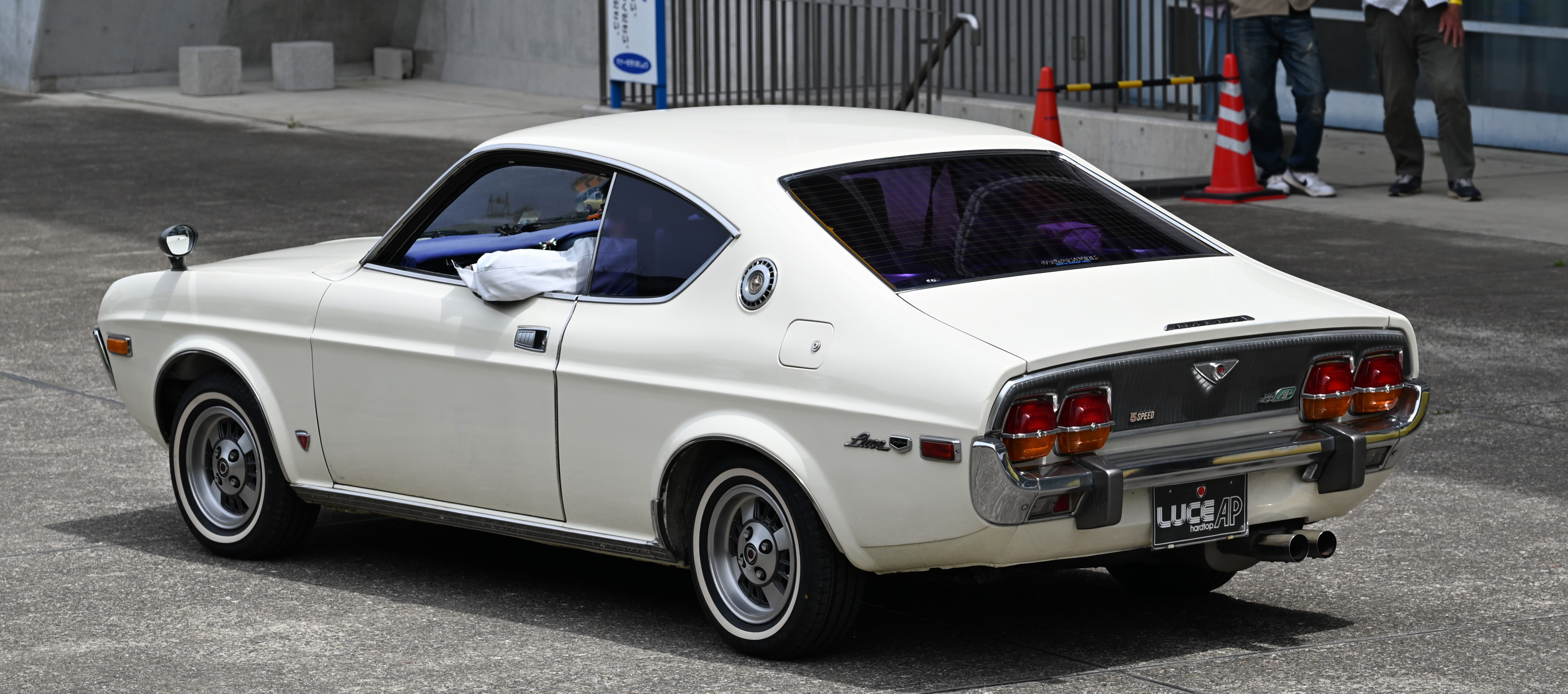
Rear view (coupe)

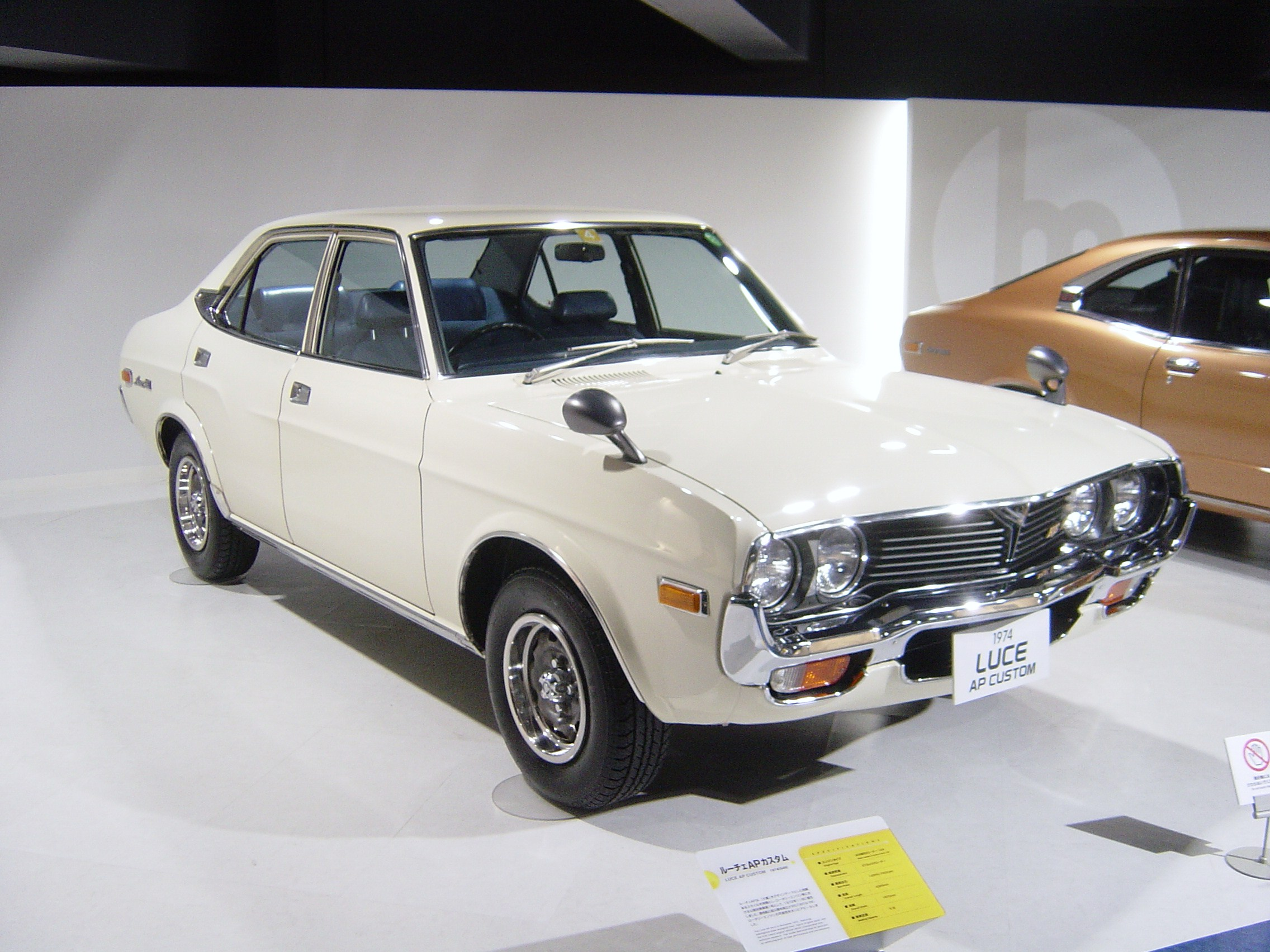
1972-1975 Mazda Luce AP Custom Sedan

While the Luce was a large, luxuriously equipped sedan, it still complied to Japanese Government dimension regulations, and it wasn't the largest sedan Mazda sold in Japan. That honor went to the short-lived Mazda Roadpacer, which was based on GM Australia's Holden Premier. The LA2VV station wagon entered production in September 1973. The wagon lasted until 1979, until being replaced by the LA4 wagon. Two rotary engines were offered, the regular 12A and low-emission AP 13B. There were also piston models available, and van models for the Japanese market.

Engines:

- 1973–1979 1.8 L (1769 cc) 1800 I4, 2-barrel, 83 hp (61 kW)/101 lb·ft (137 N·m) (export), 110 and 105 PS (81 and 77 kW) (1973 LA2VV van and 1975 LA2V Van, Japan)
- 1974–1977 13B (1308 cc), 127 hp (93 kW)/138 lb·ft (188 N·m)

=== RX-4 ===
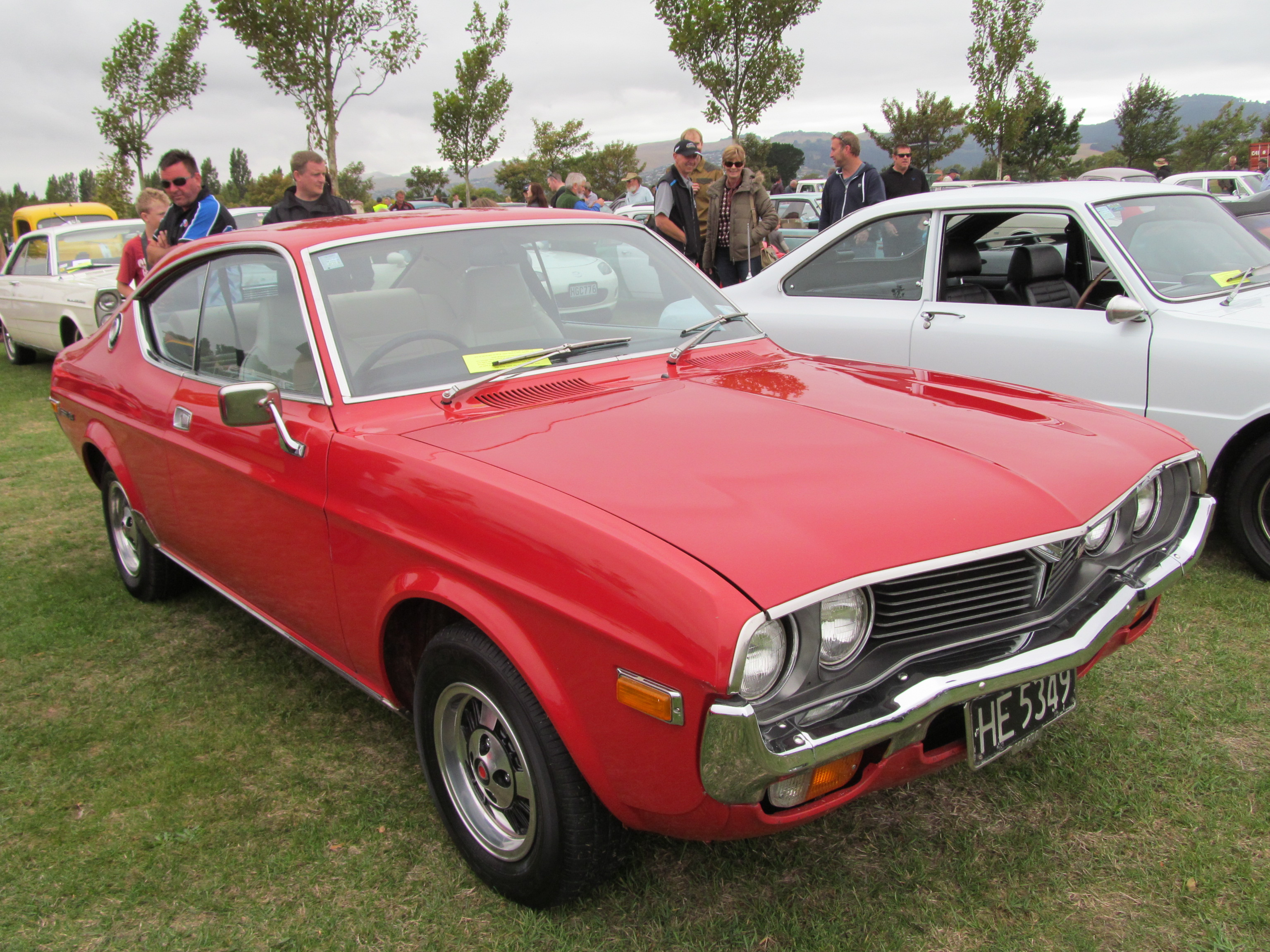
1974 Mazda RX-4 coupe (LA2; New Zealand)

In most export markets, the Japanese Luce Rotary sold as the Mazda RX-4. It was a larger car than its rotary-powered contemporaries, the Capella-based RX-2 and Grand Familia-based RX-3. It used the Luce chassis, replacing the R130 in October 1972, and was produced through October 1977. Its predecessor (the R130) and replacement (the rotary Luce Legato) were not sold in the United States. Mazda marketed the RX-4 as being sporty and luxurious "personal luxury car" with the RX-4 having the best of both worlds. This gave Mazda a well needed boost in the popularity of the Wankel engine unique to Mazda. In Japan, the rotary-engined variants offered an advantage with regards to the annual road tax bill in that Japanese drivers paid less than the in-line engine equivalents, while receiving more performance from the rotary engine.

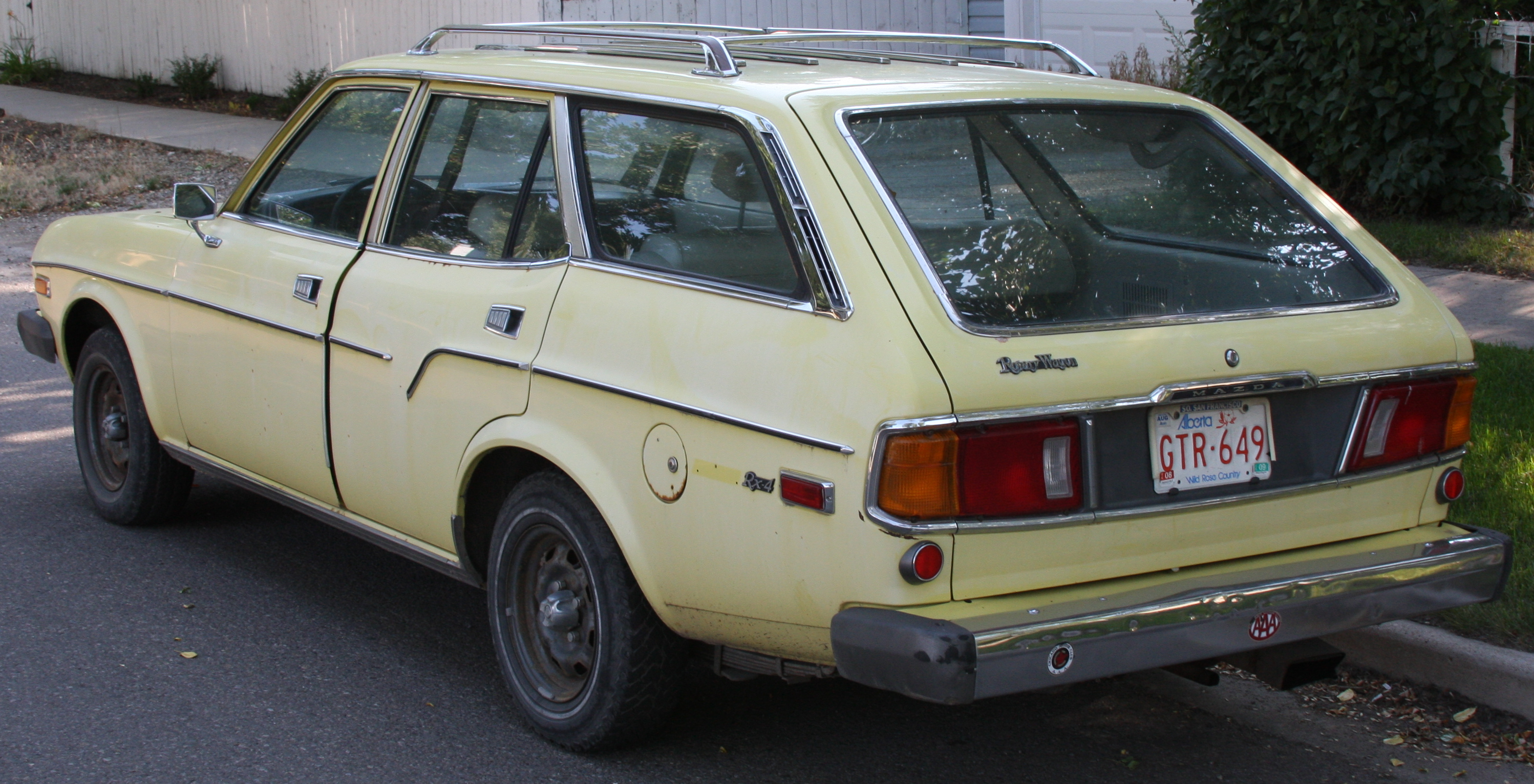
Mazda RX-4 wagon (LA2; Canada)

The RX-4 was initially available as a hardtop coupé and sedan, with a station wagon launched in 1973 to replace the Savanna Wagon. Under the hood at first was a 130 or 120 PS (96 or 88 kW) 12A engine, with the higher-powered version reserved for the five-speed GR-II and GS-II models. The extra power was due to a different exhaust and adjusted ignition timing. The emissions scrubbed "AP" models had five horsepower less, although after June 1973 they received the same power as the regular versions. This was complemented and then replaced by the larger 13B in December 1973 producing 135 PS (99 kW). This model has 125 PS (92 kW), for export. This engine was Mazda's new "AP" (for "anti-pollution") version, with much-improved emissions and fuel economy, but somewhat worse cold-starting behavior. In South Africa it was produced until 1979, all years only with the AP engine.

The car used a strut-type independent suspension in front with a live axle in the rear. Brakes were discs in front and drums in the rear. Curb weight was low at 1,188 kg (2,620 lb) and the wheelbase fairly short at 2,510 mm (99 in). The body was freshened in 1976.

United States

For the United States market, the RX-4 was sold from 1974 through 1978, when the RX-7 debuted. The 13B produced 110 hp (82 kW) and 159 N⋅m (117 lb⋅ft) in United States emissions form. Base pricing was $4295, with the automatic transmission ($270) and air conditioning ($395) the only expensive options. All three bodystyles were on offer in the United States.

Road & Track magazine was impressed, noting the car's improved fuel economy and price compared to the RX-3. This was notable, as the Wankel engine had suffered by the mid 1970s with a reputation as a gas-guzzler. Performance was good in a 1974 comparison test of six wagons, with an 11.7 s sprint to 97 km/h (60 mph) and an 18 s/77.5 mph quarter-mile. The magazine noted that the wagon's brakes suffered from the extra 136 kg (300 lb) weight compared to the coupé.

The RX-4 was on Road & Track magazine's Ten Best list for "Best Sports Sedan, $3500–6500" in 1975.

=== 929 ===
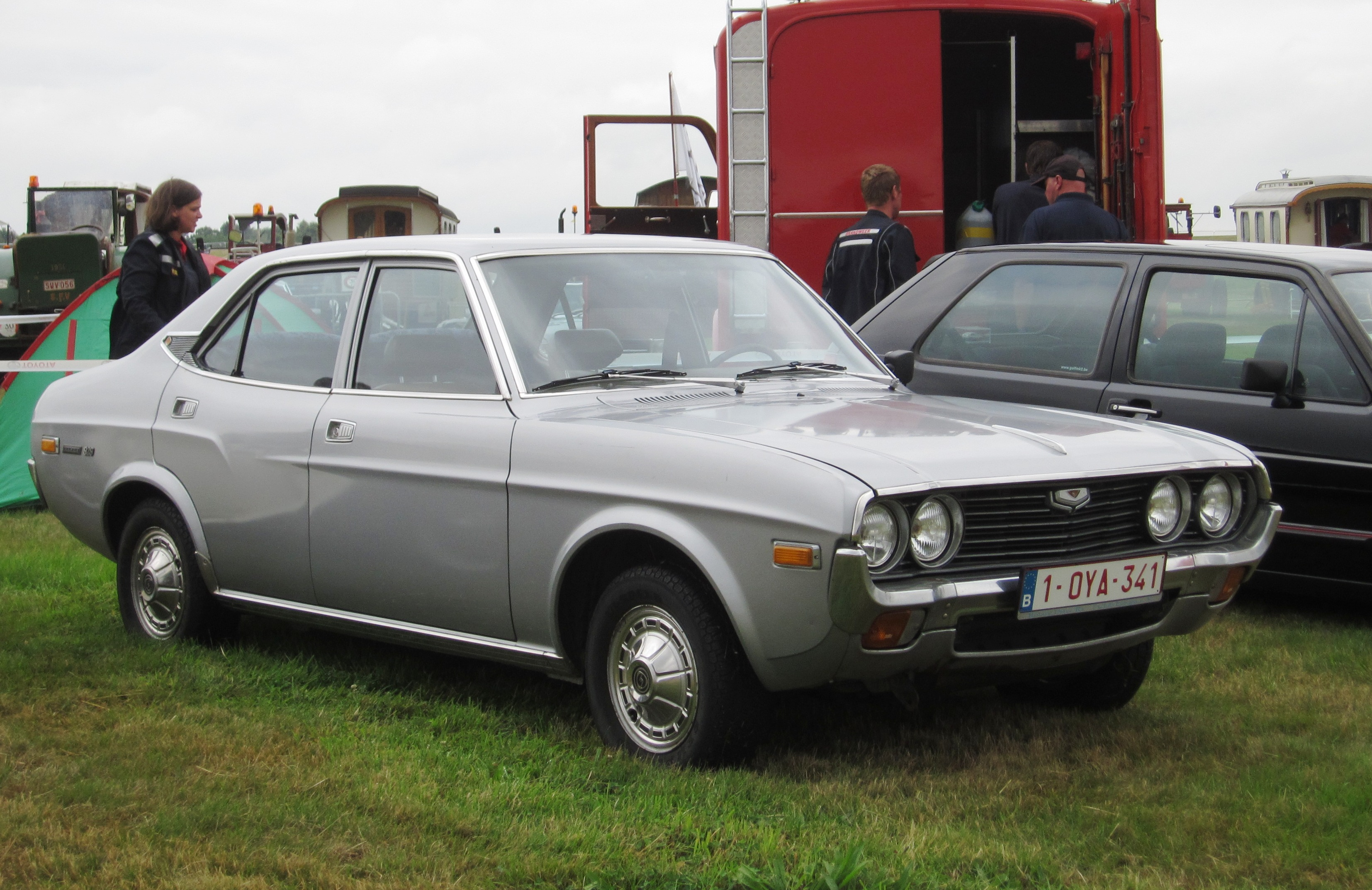
Mazda 929 sedan (LA2; Europe)

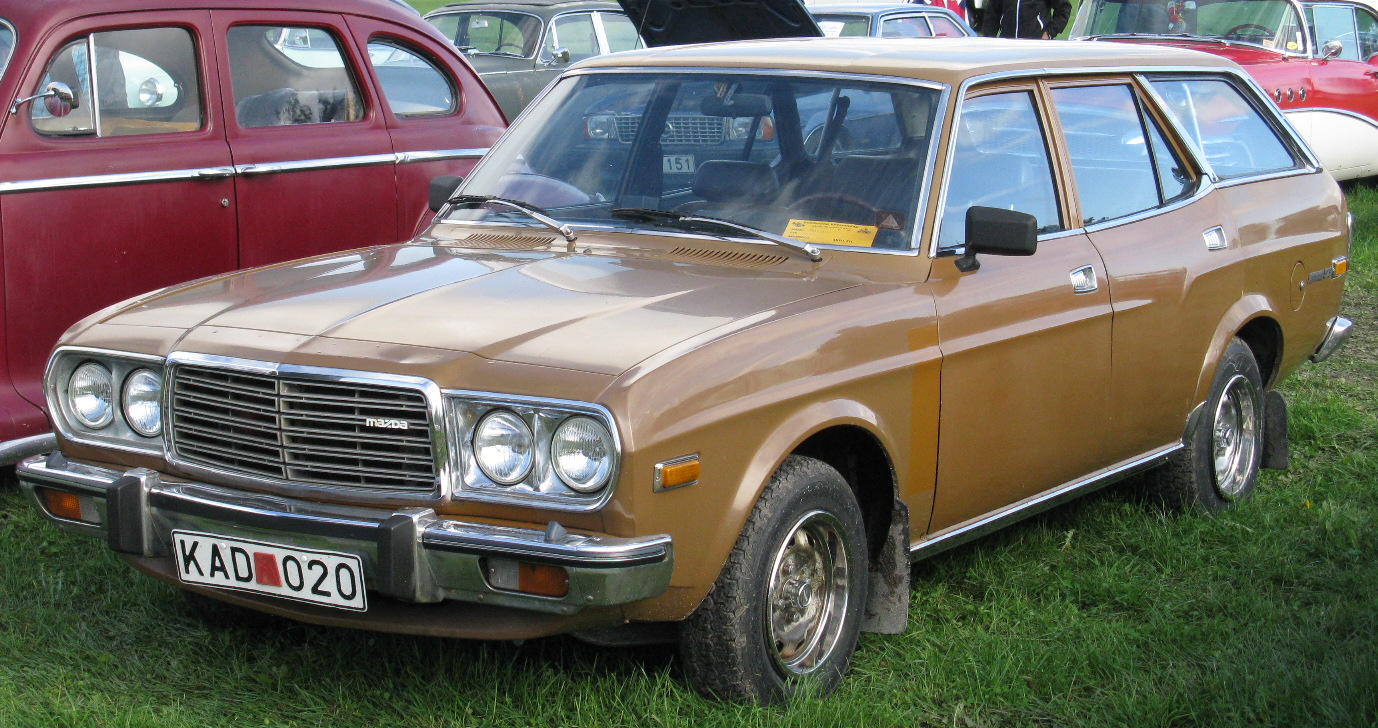
Mazda 929 wagon (LA3; Europe)

The first Mazda 929 was introduced in 1973, as an export name for the piston-engined second generation Mazda Luce. The first generation Luce had been called the "Mazda 1500" or "Mazda 1800" in export markets, but as engines of different displacement were beginning to be used across lines, such a naming philosophy would have soon become confusing. The 929/Luce was a large (for Japan) coupé, sedan, and station wagon powered by a 1769 cc Mazda VB engine. Output was 94 PS (69 kW) and 137 N⋅m (101 lb⋅ft).

The Luce/929 was updated in 1975 with an optional 1970 cc engine which produced 103 PS (76 kW) and 167 N⋅m (123 lb⋅ft) from a two-barrel carburetor.

Engines:

- 1973–1977 1.8 L (1769 cc) VB I4, 2-barrel, 94 PS (69 kW; 93 hp)/137 N⋅m (101 lb⋅ft)

== LA4 series (1977–1981) ==
LA4
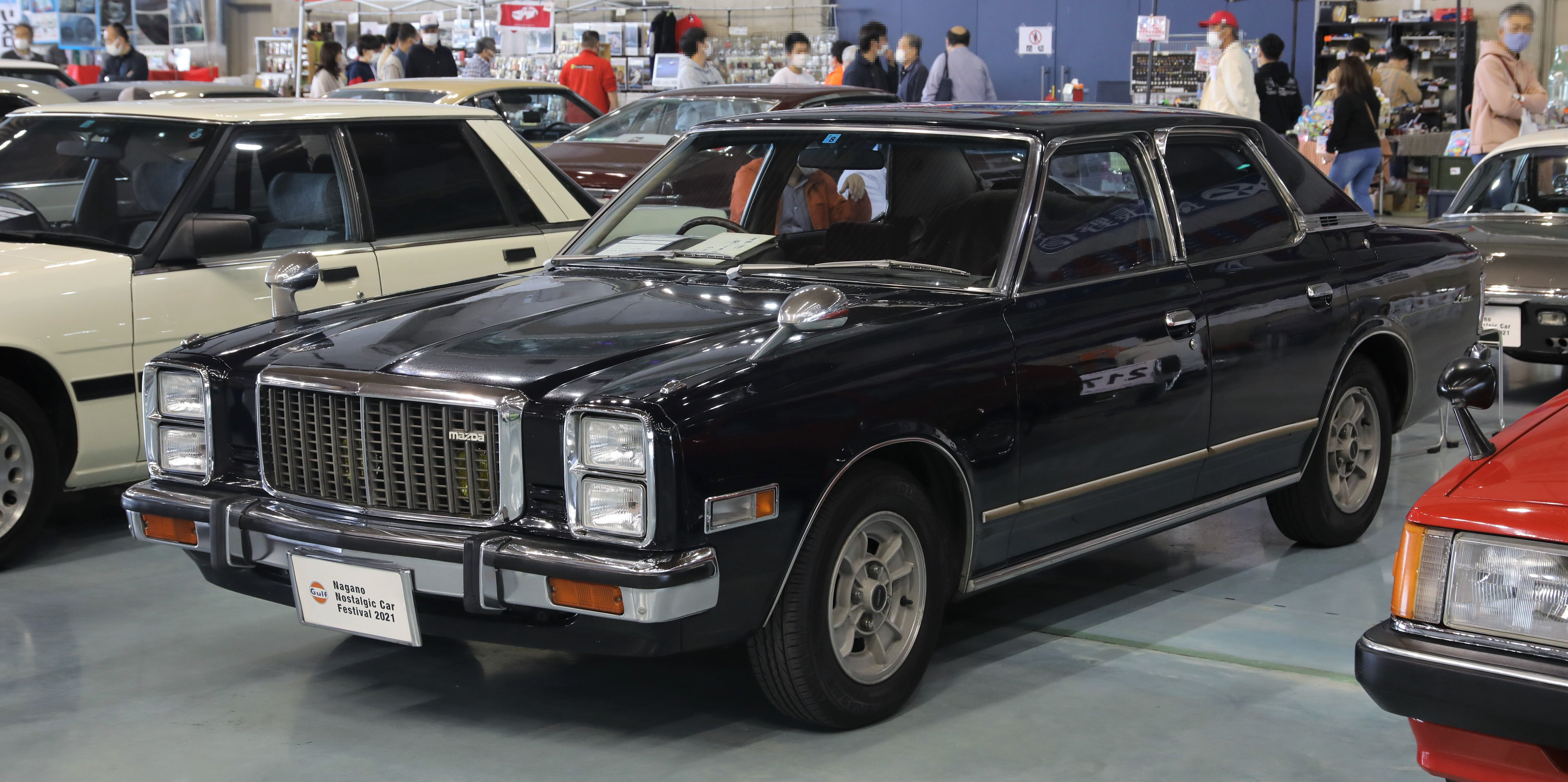
- 1977 Mazda Luce Legato (pre-facelift)

Overview
- Model code: LA4
- Also called: Mazda Luce Legato; Mazda 929L; Mazda 2000; Mazda RX-9; Haima HMC6470L (China)
- Production: 1977.10–1981.10 (sedan); 1979–1988 (wagon/van)

Body and chassis
- Body style: 4-door sedan; 4-door hardtop sedan; 5-door station wagon/van
- Layout: FR layout
- Related: Mazda Cosmo

Powertrain
- Engine: 1.8 L VC I4 (LA4V); 2.0 L F/MA I4 (LA4M); 1.2 L 12A Wankel (LA42); 1.3 L 13B Wankel (LA43); 2.2 L S2 diesel I4 (LA4S)
- Transmission: 4/5-speed manual; 3-speed automatic

Dimensions
- Wheelbase: 2,610 mm (102.8 in)
- Length: sedan: 4,625 mm (182.1 in); wagon: 4,740 mm (186.6 in)
- Width: 1,690 mm (66.5 in)
- Height: sedan: 1,385 mm (54.5 in); wagon: 1,455 mm (57.3 in)
- Curb weight: sedan: 1,235 kg (2,723 lb)

The Luce Legato (introduced as the LA4 series in October 1977) was a large and luxurious sedan, still powered by Mazda's piston or rotary engines. It was also available as a four-door pillarless hardtop that looked like a huge, square coupé, and a wagon, which had more of a utilitarian role than the sedans. The coupé was replaced by the Mazda Cosmo (CD). Production of the Luce 1800 (LA4VS) and 2000 (LA4MS) sedans started in October 1977, ending in July (LA4VS) and September 1981 (LA4MS) for the Japanese market. Of the rotary-engined Luce sedans, the LA42S with the 12A engine was manufactured between September 1977 and April 1978, while the larger LA43S with the 13B introduced at the same time lasted until October 1981.

This generation sedan was not sold in North America. It was originally designated as the Luce Legato, but the Japanese automobile industry authorities would not allow for what they considered a name change and so it was officially sold as simply the Luce. The "L" for "Legato" suffix hung on though, with export models receiving the new car as the "929L". Legato is a musical term meaning "to make a smooth transition from one note to another"

The rebodied Mazda Luce Legato became the second generation 929 in 1978 for export markets, often called the 929L. There was no coupé version developed of this generation, although a four-door hardtop body was available in Japan and some other markets including France. A station wagon was added in February 1979. The design was American-inspired, with stacked rectangular headlights and a large chrome grille. The rather heavy and old-fashioned exterior was made to look even older by having a very up-to-date interior and dashboard. In Europe, a more efficient 2.0-liter inline-four, producing 90 PS (66 kW) with a single-barrel carb replaced the existing engines.

First presented in Japan in October 1979 was a facelifted LA4 version with large, rectangular headlights and a more orthodox and European front appearance. The final addition was a 2.2-liter diesel engine produced between August 1980 and July 1981 for the sedan (LA4SS) from November 1981 for the wagon (LA4SV). Its output was 66 PS (49 kW) and 141 N⋅m (104 lb⋅ft). In October 1980, a fuel injected 120 PS (88 kW) version of the 2-liter engine was also introduced for the Japanese market; it was only available with the hardtop bodywork and full equipment. The 929 was replaced after November 1981 by the next generation Luce/929, although the second generation station wagon continued in production until March 1988 as no wagon replacement of subsequent generations was ever developed. At the time of the generational change, the diesel engine was also installed in the van (wagon) model, only available with the GL equipment level.

Aside from the regular piston-engined variants, the 12A or 13B rotary engines were on offer. The piston-engined variants were exported as the Mazda 929. A rotary-engined version was exported to "general issue" countries and sold as an RX-9. Most RX-9s were sold with the smaller 12A engine.

Engines:

- 1977–1981 1.8 L (1769 cc) I4, 2-barrel, 83 PS (61 kW; 82 hp)/137 N⋅m (101 lb⋅ft)
- 1977–1981 2.0 L F/MA (1970 cc) I4, 1-barrel, 90 PS (66 kW; 89 hp)
- 1977–1978 12A
- 1977–1981 13B, 127 PS (93 kW; 125 hp)/187 N⋅m (138 lb⋅ft)
- 1980–1981 2.2 L diesel, 66 PS (49 kW; 65 hp)/141 N⋅m (104 lb⋅ft)
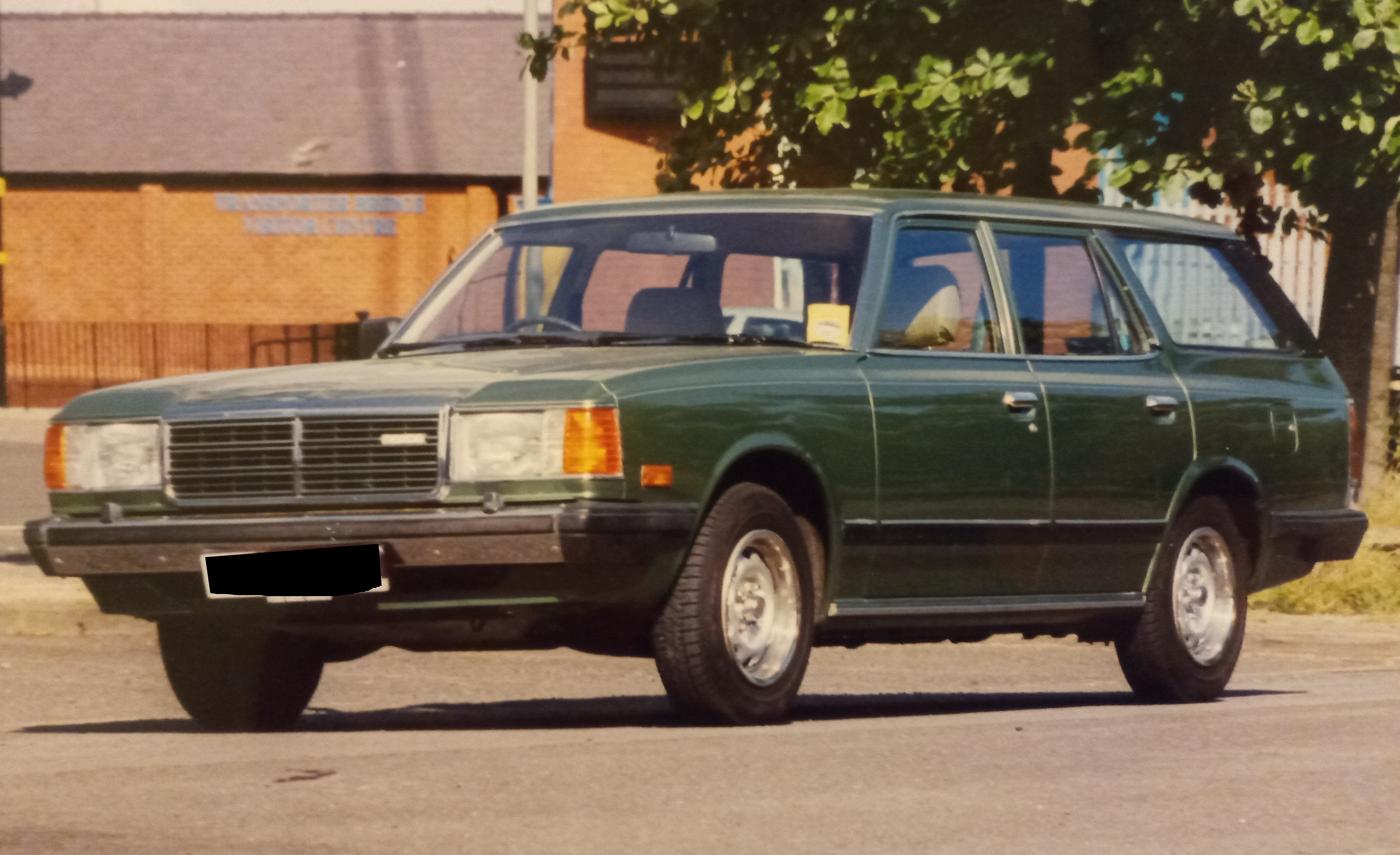
Facelift 929L estate

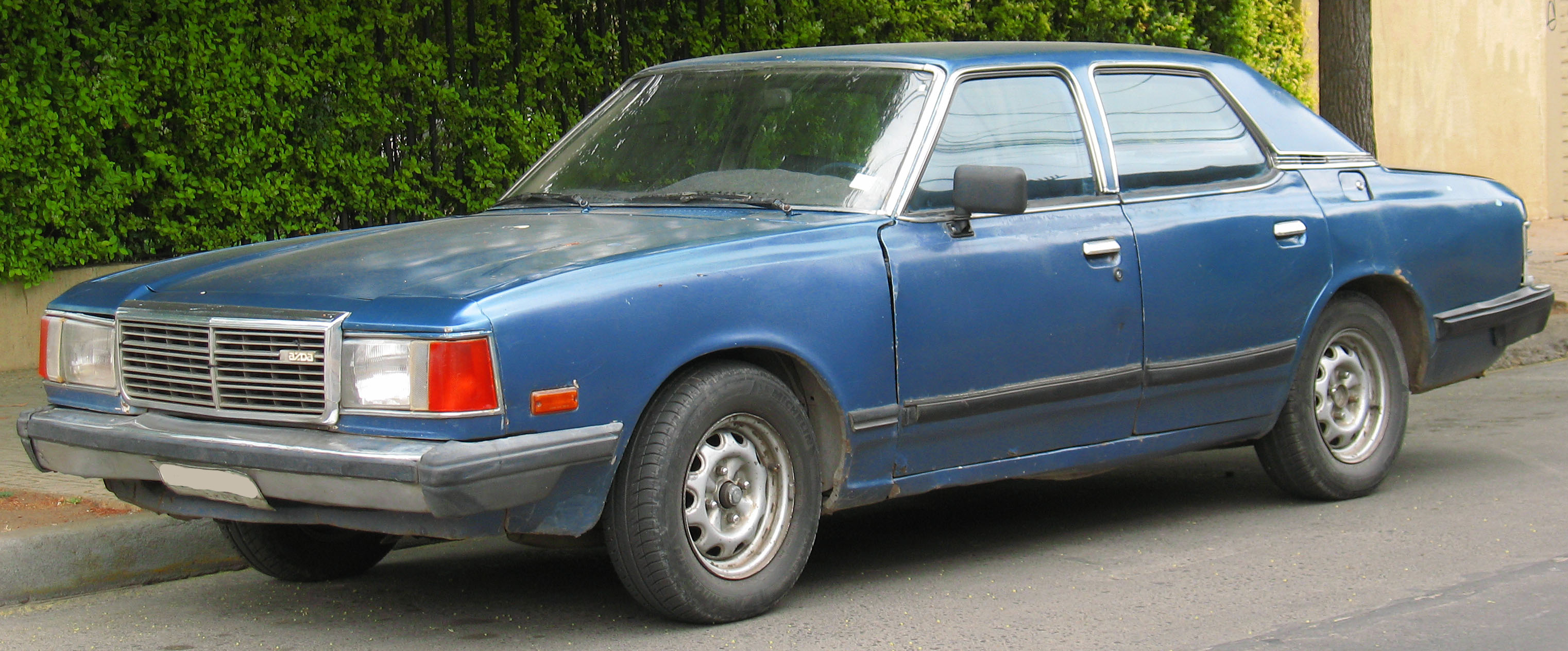
Facelift 929 hardtop sedan

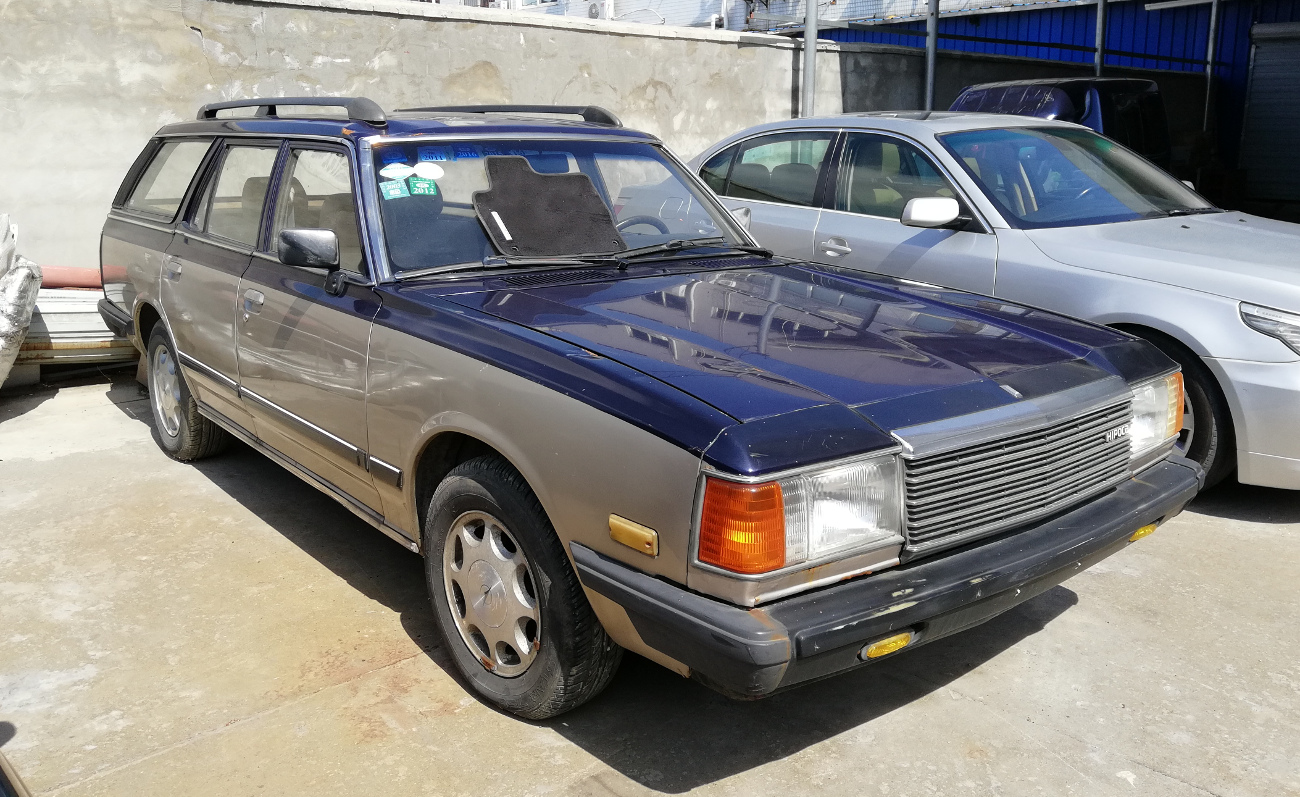
Haima HMC6470L

== HB series (1981–1986) ==
HB series
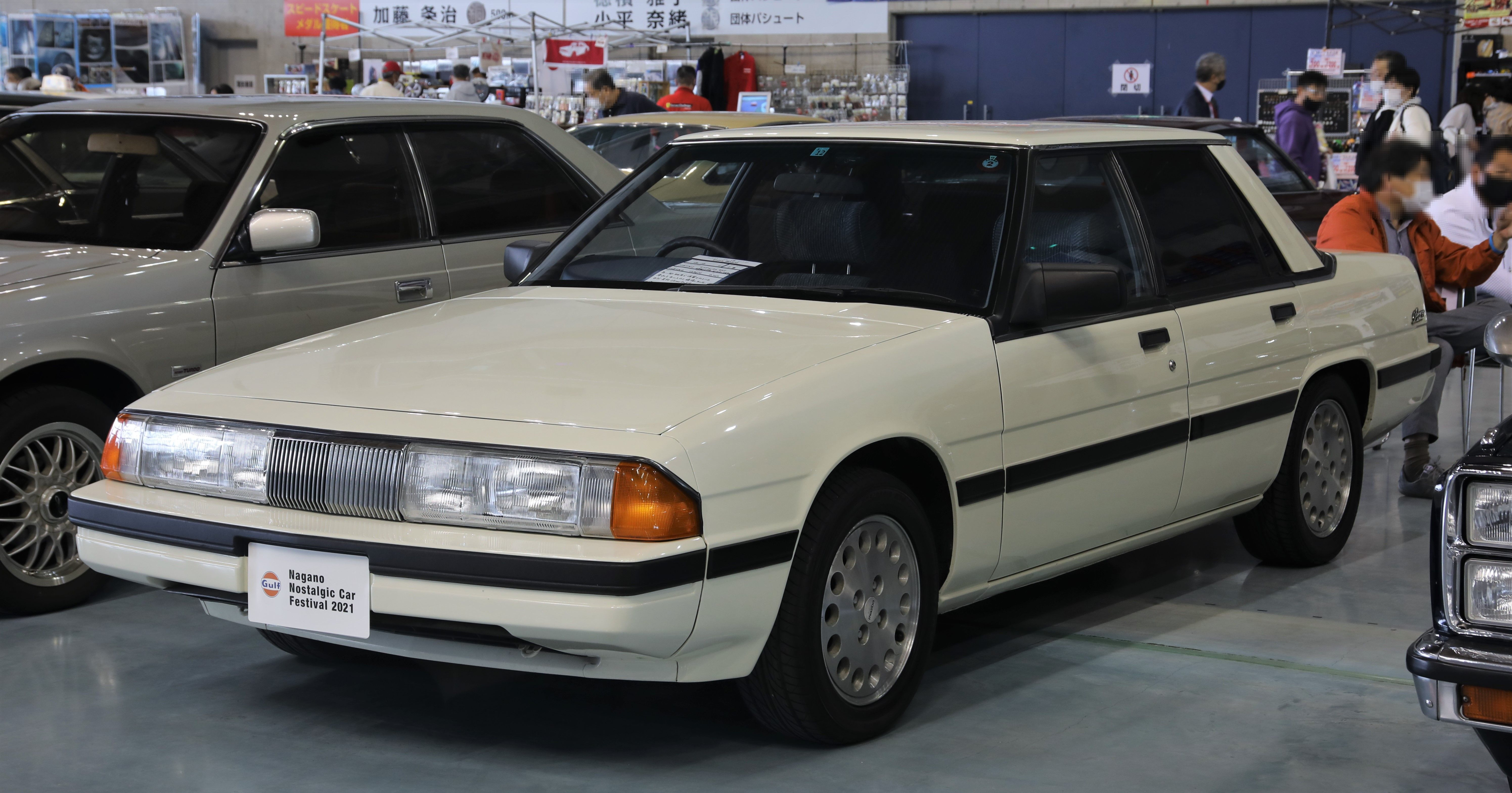
- Pre-facelift Mazda Luce Rotary Limited Hardtop

Overview
- Model code: HB
- Also called: Mazda 929; Mazda Custom Cab; Mazda Cosmo
- Production: October 1981–1986; 1986–December 1995 (Custom Cab)

Body and chassis
- Body style: 4-door hardtop; 4-door sedan
- Layout: FR layout
- Related: Mazda Cosmo

Powertrain
- Engine: 1.8 L VC I4; 2.0 L F/MA I4; 2.0 L FE I4; 1146 cc 12A Wankel; 1308 cc 13B Wankel; 2.2 L S2 diesel I4
- Transmission: 5-speed manual; 3-speed automatic

Dimensions
- Wheelbase: 2,615 mm (103.0 in)
- Length: 4,665 mm (183.7 in)
- Width: 1,690 mm (66.5 in)
- Height: 1,360 mm (53.5 in)
- Curb weight: 1,215 kg (2,679 lb)

The next generation of Luce was built on the HB platform. Production started in October 1981. Exports again occurred as the 929. Japanese customers could purchase the Luce or the rebadged Mazda Cosmo sold at an exclusive dealership called "Mazda Auto Store". Later in 1991, Mazda Auto locations were renamed Eunos. Unlike the Luce, the Cosmo was also sold as a coupé, also exported as the 929 coupé. The Luce and Cosmo both offered rotary, gasoline-powered piston-engines, and also a 2.2-liter diesel engine. From 1989, an LPG-powered 2.0-liter version of the Luce sedan was also built for the Japanese market for taxi and other fleet usage. Called the Mazda Custom Cab, it remained in production until December 1995. This generation Mazda Luce was known as the Haima HMC6470L in China and was produced from 1992 to 2002. A 2.0 or 2.2 liter engine was available paired to a 5 speed manual gearbox.

It was a large front-engine rear-wheel drive sedan or hardtop sedan. The Luce was built on the new HB platform, which was now shared with the Cosmo. This version was introduced as the 929 in 1982 in most export markets and produced until 1986. Luces and Cosmos received several differing front end treatments, with export 929s receiving the very staidest front end designs for 929 sedans and the sportiest flip-up headlight "Cosmo" design for 929 coupés. No station wagon variant was issued on the HB platform; the previous LA4 remained in production as a wagon with a new front end (it was essentially the same as the LA4 from the A-pillar backwards).

This generation vehicle was not sold in North America. In some European markets the 929 was badged 2000 sedan or 2000E estate (applied to a facelifted version of the previous generation). The rotary-engined versions were never offered in Europe, and neither was the four-door hardtop – although parts of Europe bordering on Eastern Europe and the Middle East did receive it.

Engines:

- 1981–August 1983 1.8 L (1769 cc) I4, 2-barrel, 100 PS (74 kW; 99 hp) (Japan)
- 1981–1986 2.0 L (1970 cc) MA I4, 1-barrel, 90 PS (66 kW; 89 hp)/118 lb⋅ft (160 N⋅m)
- August 1983 – 1986 2.0 L (1998 cc) FE I4, 2-barrel, 101 PS (74 kW; 100 hp)/115 lb·ft (156 N·m)
- August 1983 – 1986 2.0 L (1998 cc) FE I4, FI, 118 PS (87 kW; 116 hp)/126 lb·ft (171 N·m)
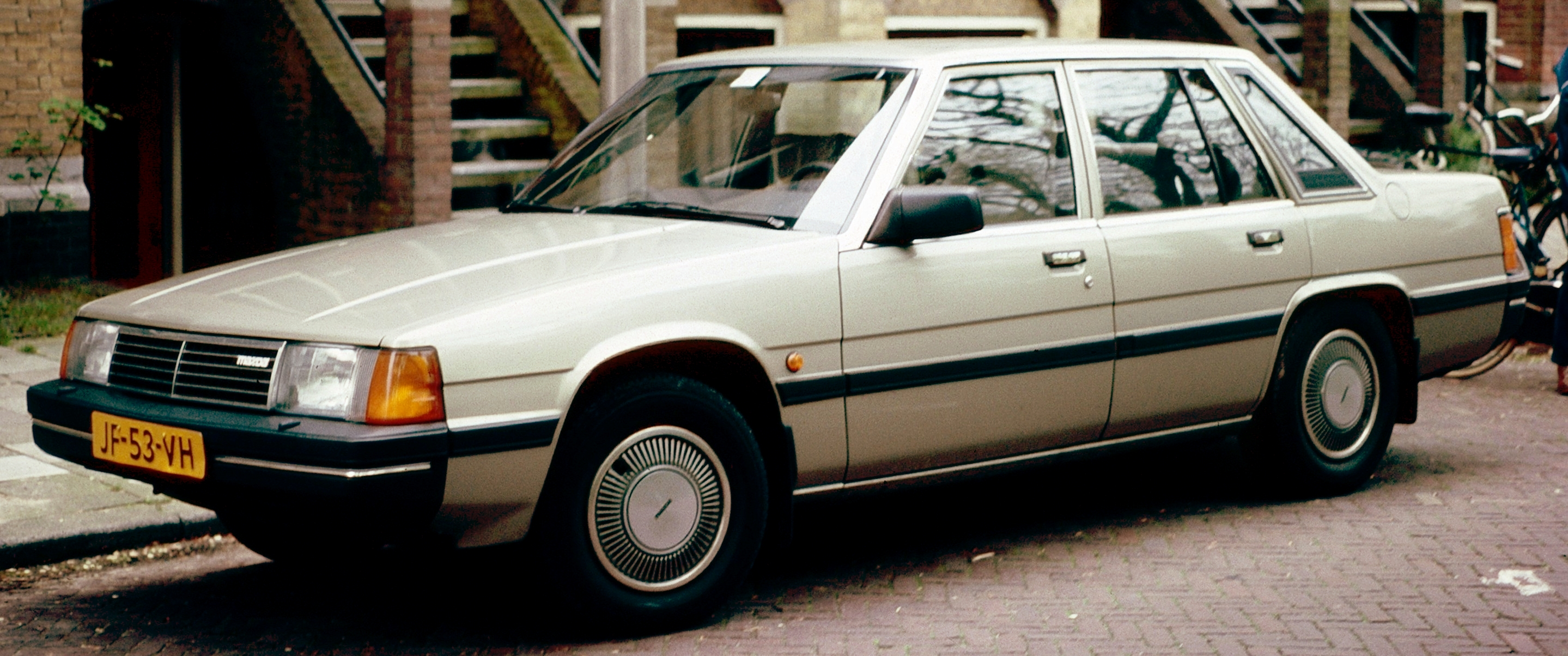
929 Sedan (pre-facelift)

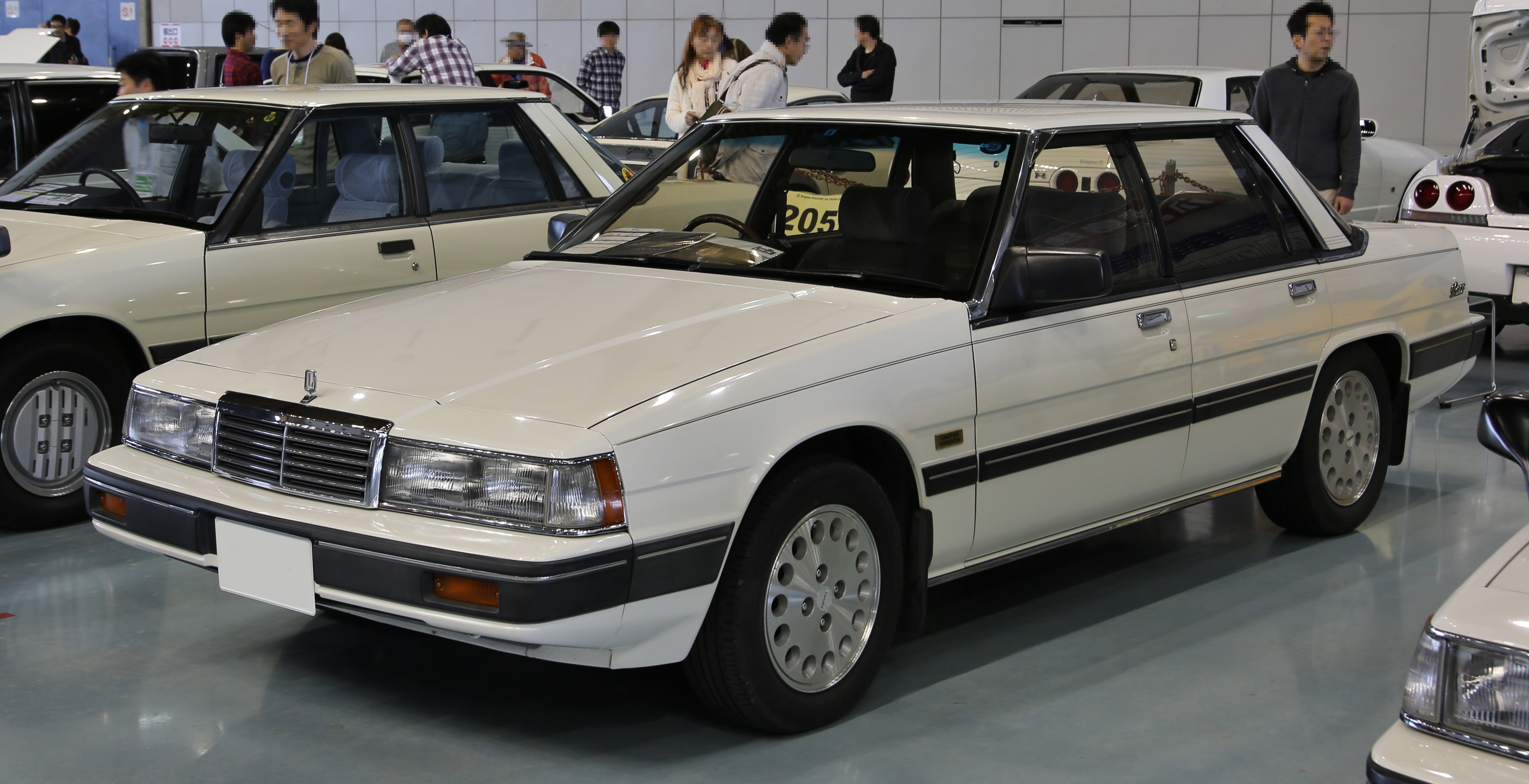
1985 Mazda Luce Genteel Limited Hardtop (facelift, Japan)

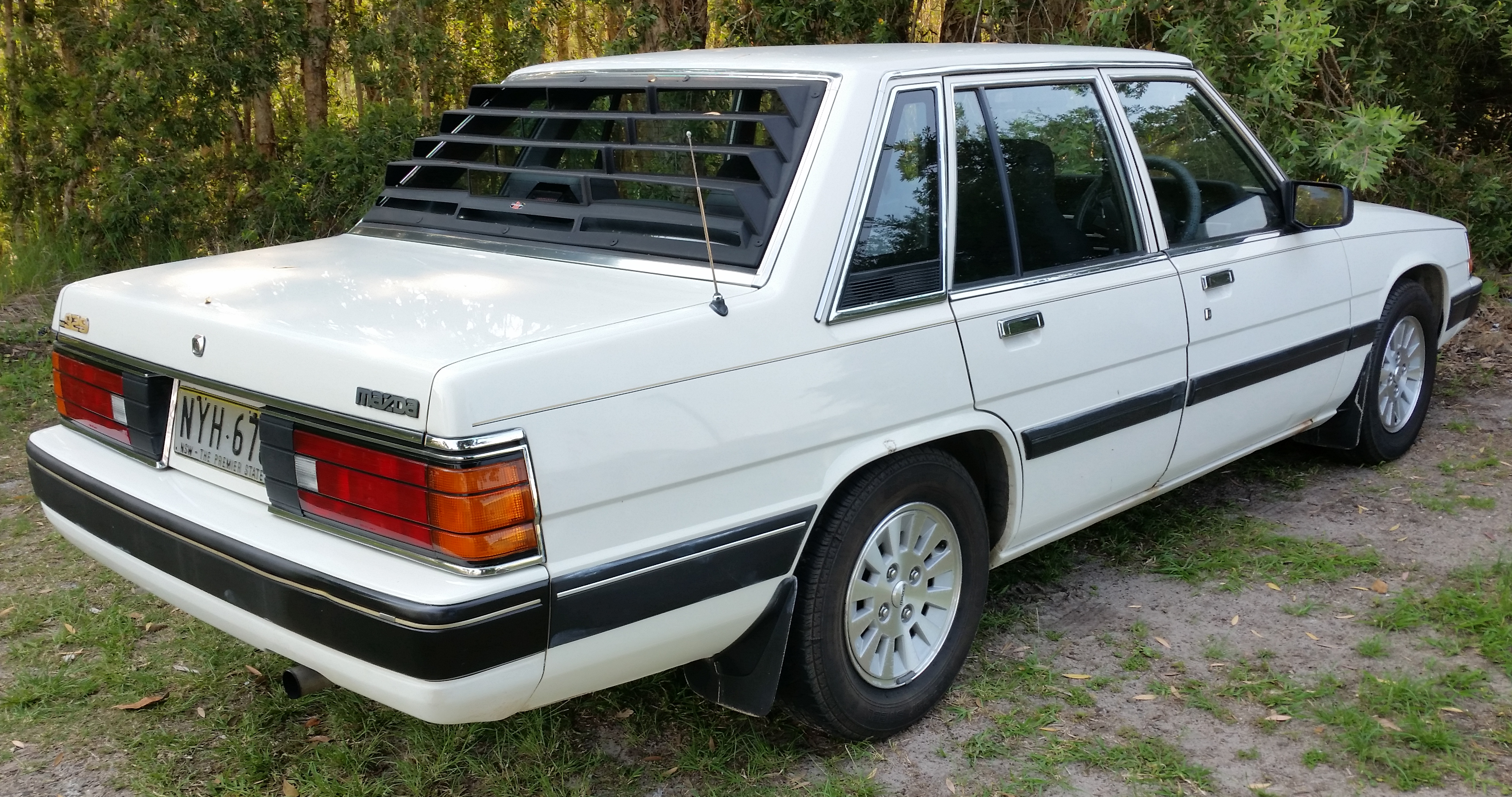
929 sedan, rear view (Australia)

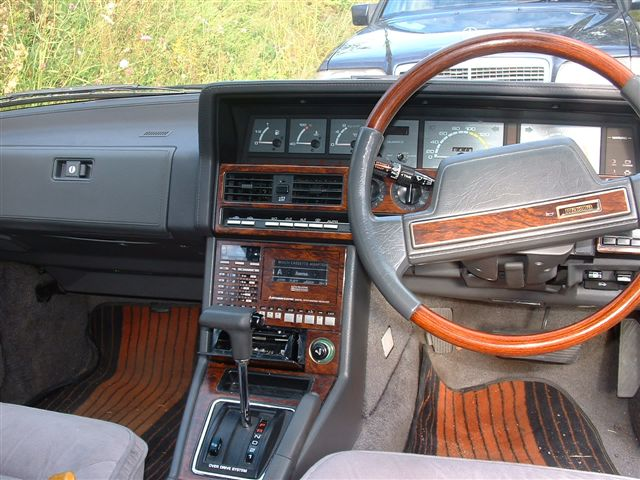
Dashboard of Luce 2.0 Genteel-X (Japan)

== HC series (1986–1991) ==
HC series
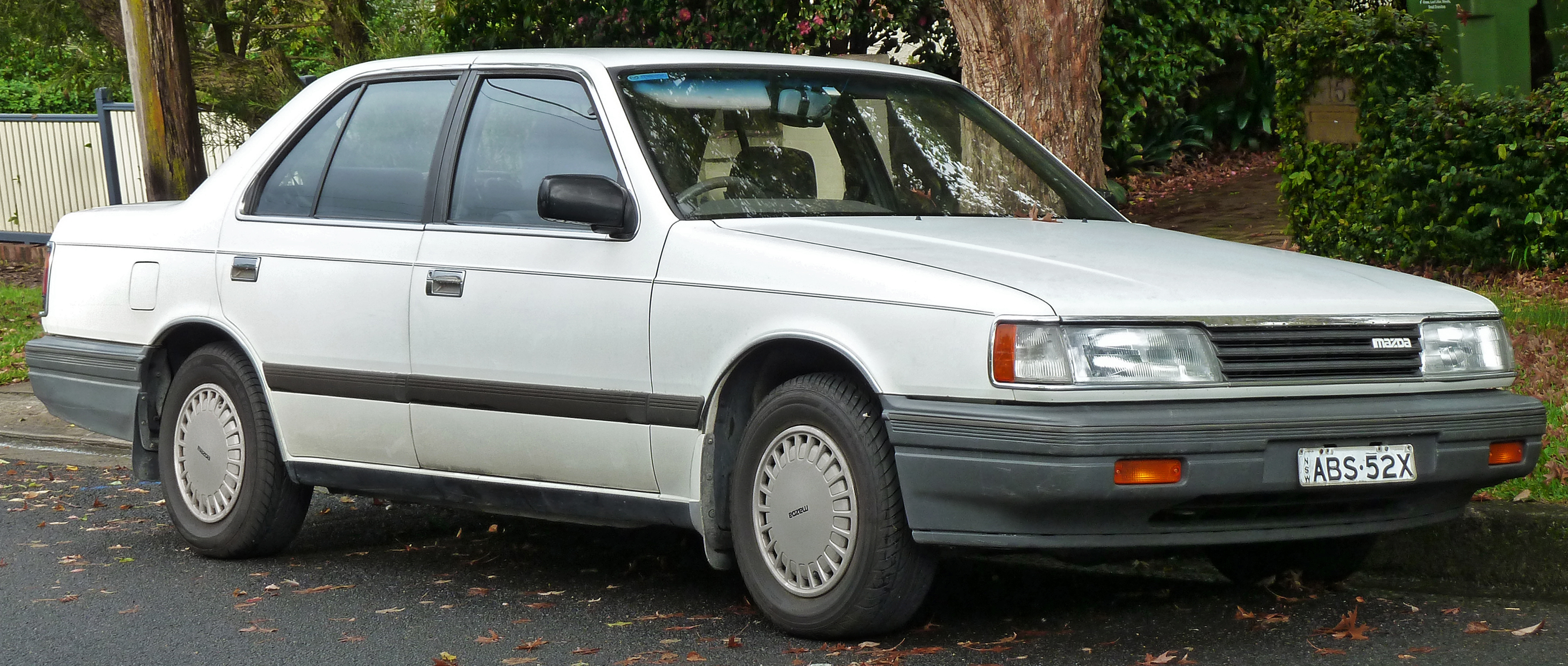

Overview
- Model code: HC
- Also called: Mazda 929; Kia Potentia
- Production: September 1986 – May 1991 (taxi only until 1995); 1992–2002 (Kia Potentia)

Body and chassis
- Body style: 4-door hardtop; 4-door sedan
- Layout: FR layout

Powertrain
- Engine: 2.0 L FE I4; 2.0 L JF V6; 2.2 L F2 I4; 3.0 L JE V6; 1.3 L 13B turbo rotary
- Transmission: 4-speed automatic; 5-speed manual

Dimensions
- Wheelbase: 2,710 mm (106.7 in)
- Length: 4,690–4,930 mm (184.6–194.1 in)
- Width: 1,695–1,725 mm (66.7–67.9 in)
- Height: 1,440–1,450 mm (56.7–57.1 in)
- Curb weight: 1,390 kg (3,064 lb)

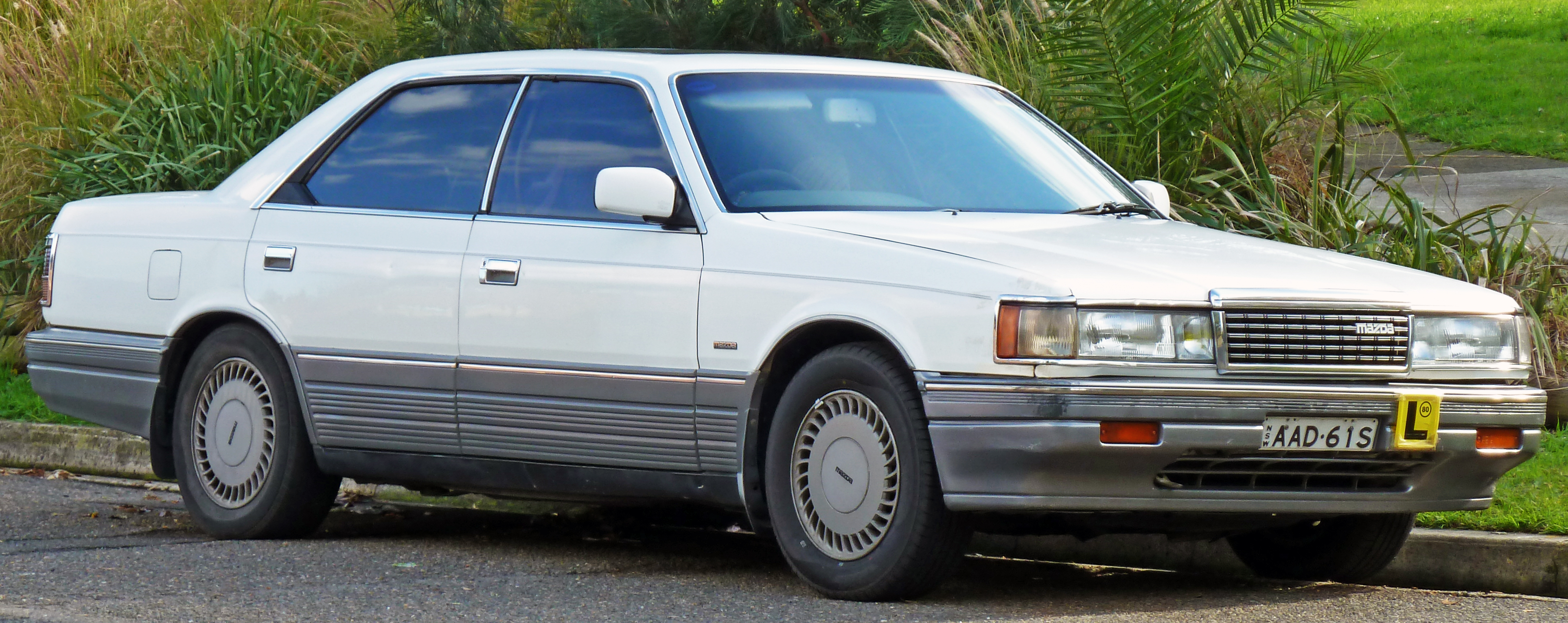
Pre-facelift Mazda 929 hardtop (Australia)

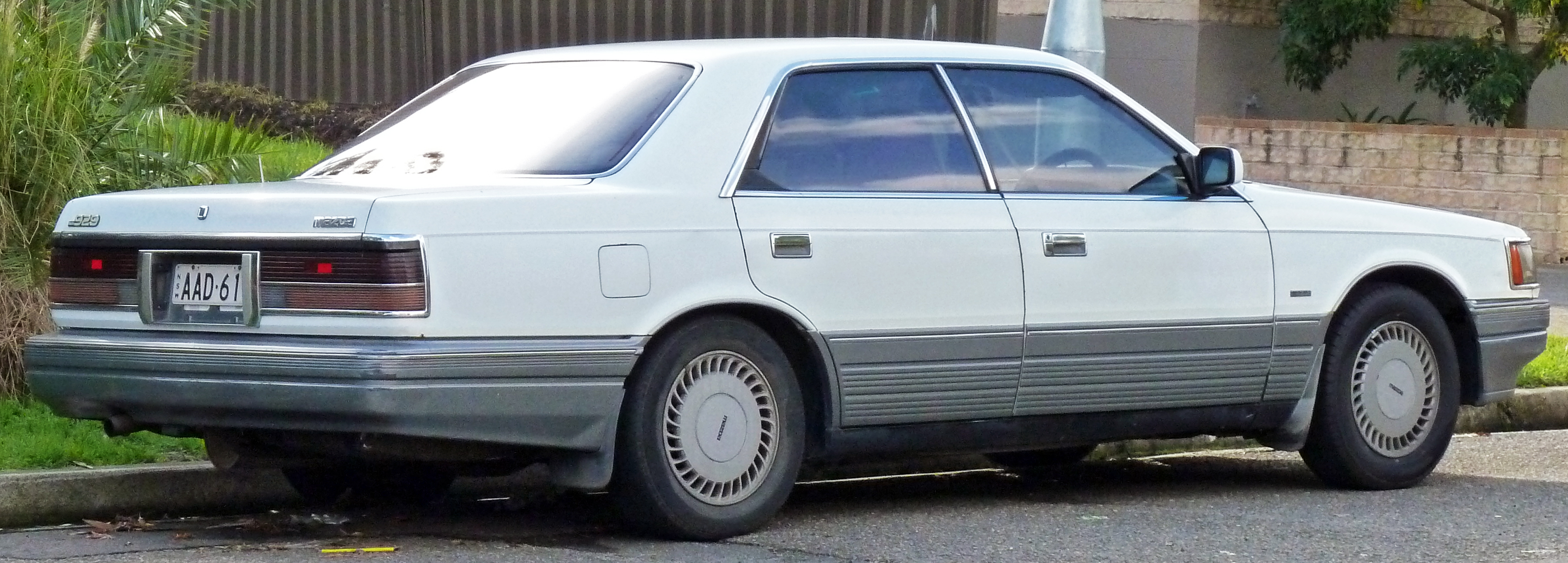
Pre-facelift Mazda 929 hardtop (Australia)

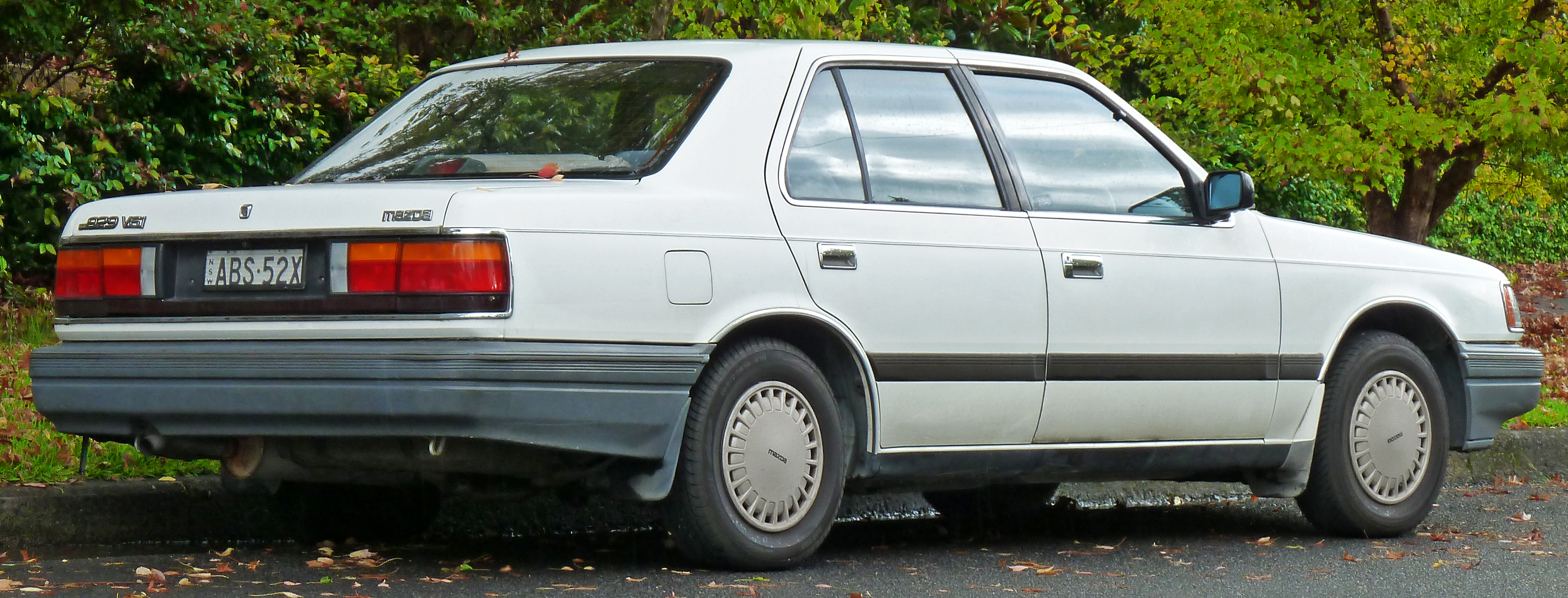
Pre-facelift Mazda 929 sedan (Australia)

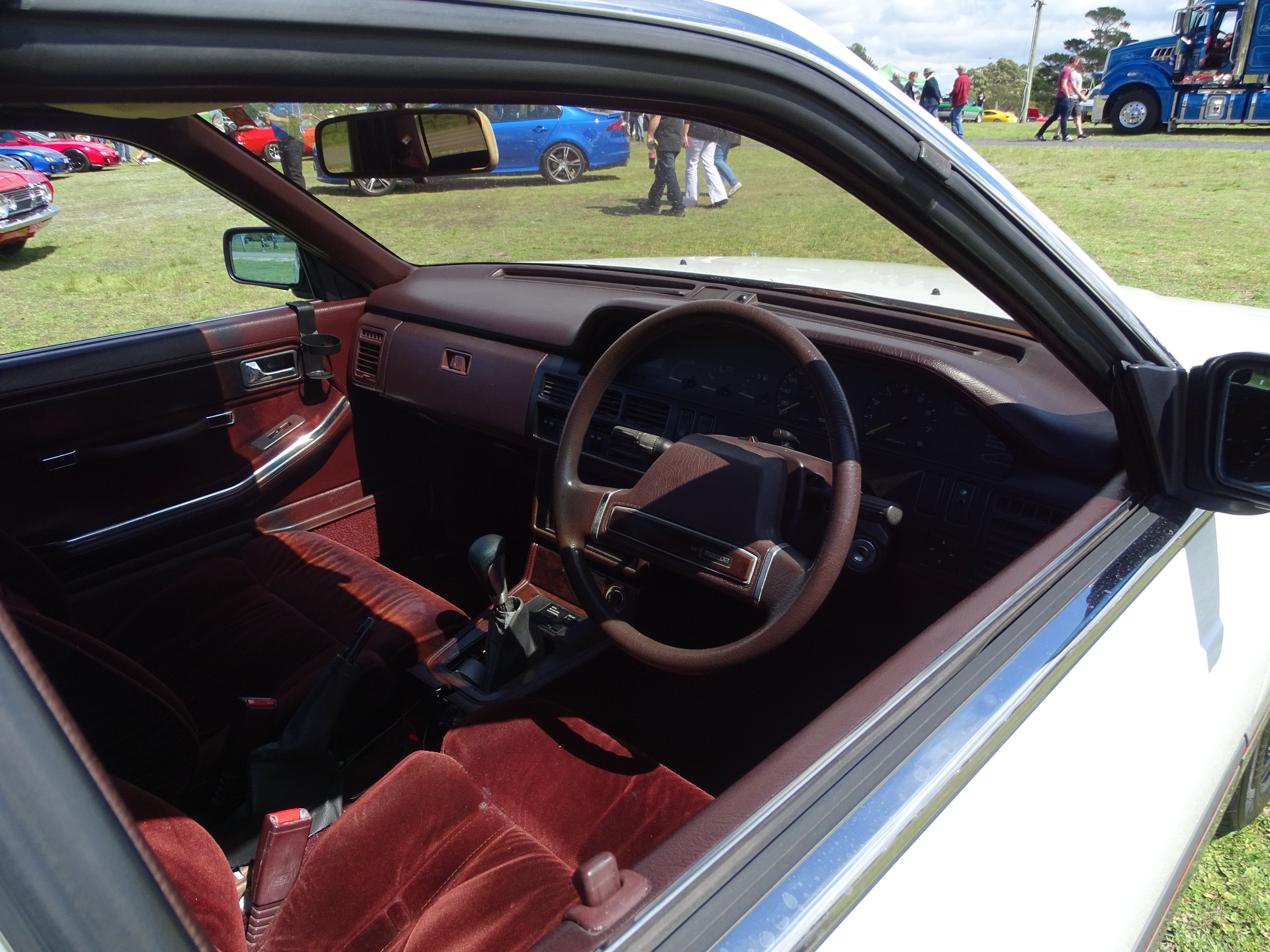
Interior

The 1986 Luce was large and luxurious on the HC platform, now with the 13B turbo engine as one of many engine options. It was still exported as the 929, and differed from the (continued) Cosmo. At its introduction in 1986, it was offered with Mazda's first V6 engine, called the Mazda J engine which came as a 2.0-liter, a 2.0-liter turbo, and a 3.0-liter for top level model

The Luce Royal Classic (and lesser-spec Limited) was more expensive than its 929 counterpart, featuring greater technical innovation. Both were pillarless hardtops. The Royal Classic was factory fitted with a turbocharged 13B Rotary or 2.0-liter V6 engines, electric leather seats, digital speedometer, a cool-box for canned beverages, prominent emblems, electronically adjustable suspension and power options throughout. In order to satisfy Japanese regulations concerning exterior dimensions and engine displacement, this generation vehicle was built in two versions; the 3.0-liter V6 was installed in the longer and wider hardtop bodystyle, and the smaller engines, including the rotary engine, were installed in the shorter and narrower sedan bodystyle. Japanese owners who chose the rotary engine over trim packages with the larger V6 engine received financial benefits in the form of a lower annual road tax bill. It was the larger model that carried over to the next platform that introduced the Mazda Sentia.

1991 was the last year of the Luce nameplate. The Eunos Cosmo was already on sale (JC), and the HD platform spawned the Mazda Sentia (now exported as the 929), and the Efini MS-9, making 1991 the last year for a four-door rotary powered sedan prior to the RX-8. In the 1990s, Mazda sold the body stampings to Kia Motors, who produced the HC series as Kia Potentia between 1992 and 2001, selling it only in South Korea.

The export market 929 was also updated in 1986 (1987 in some markets) with the HC platform and a 3.0-liter V6 engine. The car was produced through 1991, again lagging behind its Japan-market twin, the Mazda Luce, by one year. The 929 began US and Canadian sales in 1987; although predominantly available as a 3.0-liter V6, there were a rare few that made it to the North American market as a four-cylinder 2.2-liter F2 in a RWD configuration. This generation vehicle was sold in North America in sedan bodystyle only beginning with the 1988 model year; the hardtop was not available, nor were the rotary engines. Actor James Garner was used as a spokesman introducing the 929 to North America.

The HC platform came out in two variations during its five-year span that had identical engines and interior but with two distinct body shapes; a pillared four-door sedan or a slightly larger pillarless four-door hardtop. While the pillared model was common in all countries that allowed the importation of the 929 (including the US and Canada), the pillarless model was predominantly seen in the Asian and Australian markets.

The Canadian 929 came with a "Winter Package" option and included heated seats, a higher grade alternator, winter tires and non-recessed windshield wipers. A five-speed manual gearbox was an option, but most North American 929s were two-mode ('power' and 'economy') electronic four-speed automatics. Top speed was 195 km/h (121 mph). A 0–97 km/h (60 mph) time of 9.2 seconds was recorded using the manual gearbox; the automatics were somewhat slower at 10 seconds.

The first 3.0-liter V6 engine seen in the 1986–1989 929 was a Single Overhead Cam type with 18 valves. When Mazda released the higher-spec 929S model for the 1990–1991 period, the engine was upgraded to a Double Overhead Cam type with 24 valves, slightly increasing fuel economy, performance and reliability. Also in the revised edition came the presence of an anti-lock braking system, ventilated rear disc brakes and a few inconspicuous changes to the exterior. The standard 18-valve SOHC remained in the base model 929.

After mainstream production ended in May 1991, the HC remained in production until January 1996 for taxi applications in Japan.

Engines:

- 1986–1990 2.0 L (1998 cc) FE I4, 1-barrel, 82 PS (60 kW; 81 hp)/112 lb⋅ft (152 N⋅m)
- 1986–1990 2.0 L (1998 cc) FE I4, FI, 116 PS (85 kW; 114 hp)/121 lb·ft (164 Nm)
- 1986–1990 2.2 L (2184 cc) F2 I4, 1-barrel, 115 PS (85 kW; 113 hp)/129 lb⋅ft (175 N⋅m)
- 1986–1990 2.2 L (2184 cc) F2 I4, FI, 127 PS (93 kW; 125 hp)/141 lb⋅ft (191 N⋅m)
- 1986–1990 2.2 L (2184 cc) F2 I4, FI, 136 PS (100 kW; 134 hp)/139 lb⋅ft; 188 N⋅m (19.2 kg⋅m) (non-catalyzed)
- 2.0 L JFT V6, FI, 110 PS (81 kW; 108 hp)/126 lb⋅ft (171 N⋅m) (JDM only)
- 2.0 L JFT V6, FI turbocharged, 146 PS (107 kW; 144 hp)/173 lb⋅ft (235 N⋅m) (JDM only)
- 1986–1991 3.0 L (2954 cc) JE V6, FI, 158 PS (116 kW; 156 hp)/182 lb·ft (247 Nm)
- 3.0 L JE V6, FI, 190 PS (140 kW; 187 hp), 259 N⋅m (191 lb⋅ft)
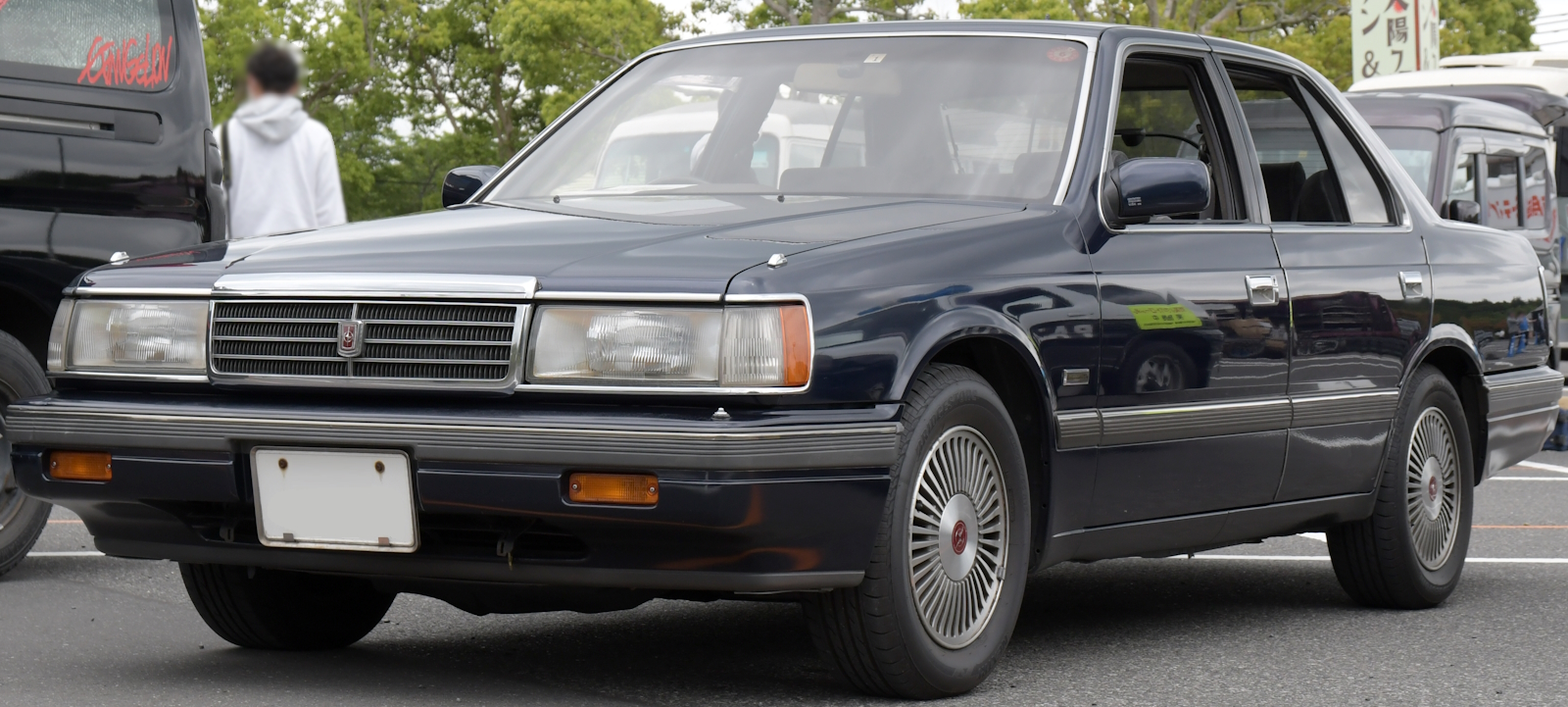
Mazda Luce Royal Classic (sedan; facelift)

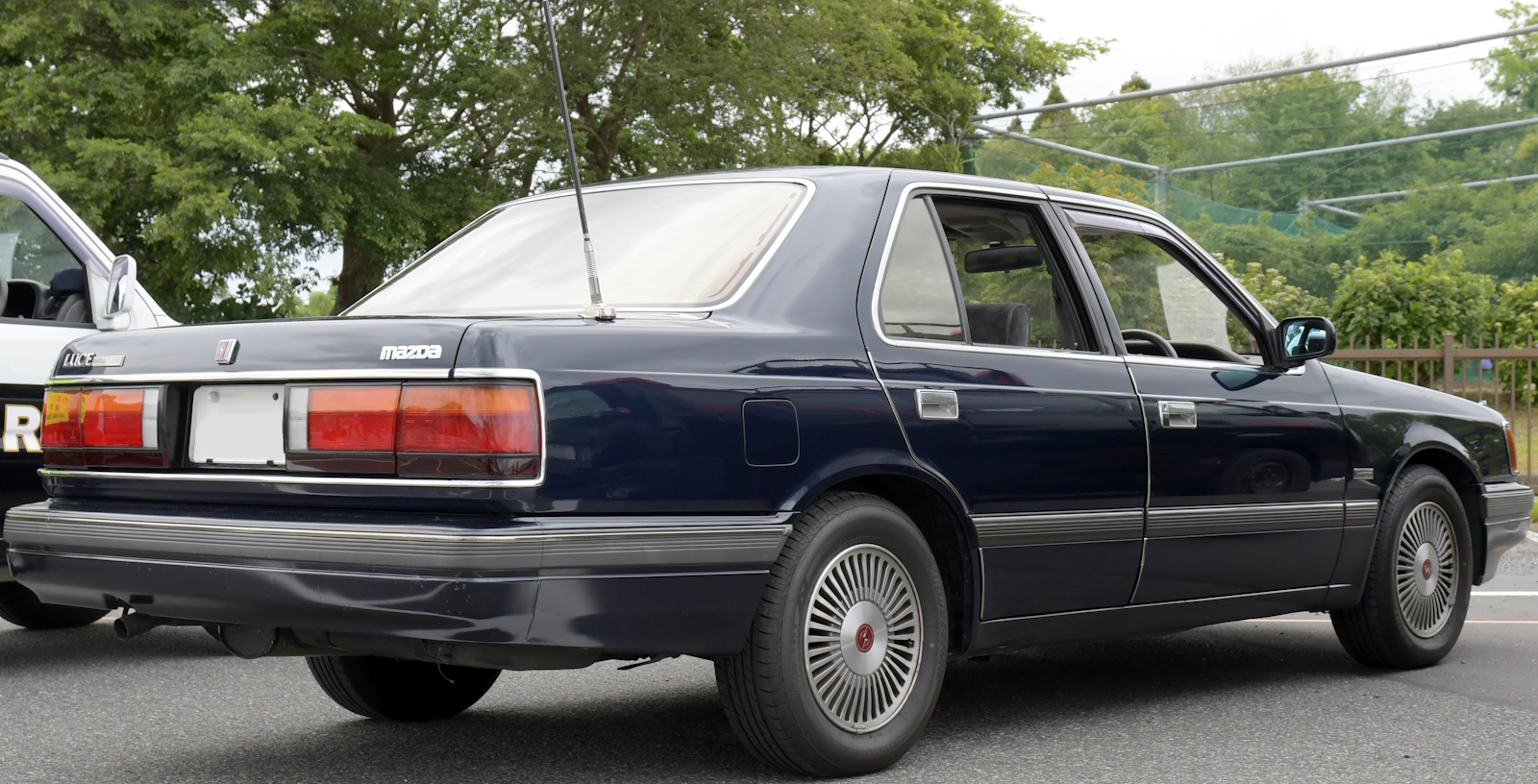
Rear view (sedan; facelift)

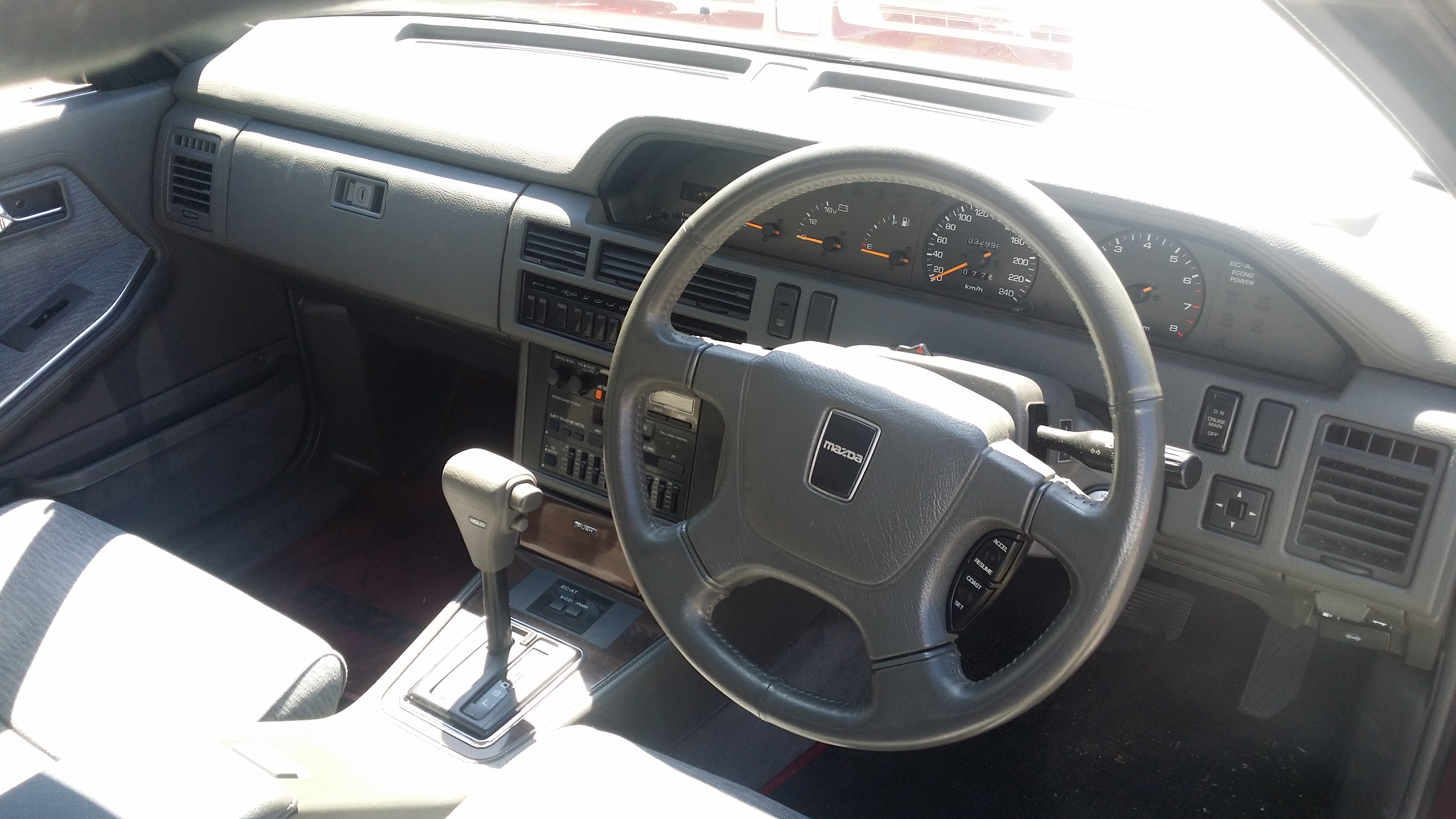
Interior

=== Kia Potentia ===
When the HC series Luce was replaced with the Mazda Sentia, it continued to be manufactured in South Korea at Kia Hwasung plant as the Kia Potentia. The Potentia was produced from 1992 until 2002 using the 2.0-liter four-cylinder Mazda FE-DOHC engine— which was the same as used in the first generation Kia Sportage's gasoline version — a 2.2-liter four-cylinder, and a 3.0-liter V6. The V6 model was called the President trim level.

In May 1997 the Potentia was given a thorough facelift, with a bulkier, more aggressive front design and heavier looking taillights. Sold as the "New Potentia," this facelift was developed by Kia themselves and was not used by Mazda. The upper versions of the Potentia were replaced by the more expensive Kia Enterprise, which was based on the Mazda Sentia and was introduced in 1997 after the Sentia was cancelled. The New Potentia was realigned in the marketplace and was now offered with a narrower range of engines and transmissions. The manual transmission, always a slow seller in South Korea, was discontinued and the engines were limited to a 2.0-liter four and a 2.5-liter V6. There was also an LPG-powered 2-liter four available. The New Potentia was unable to compete with the more modern Hyundai Grandeur and the Samsung SM5 and was partially replaced by the somewhat smaller Kia Optima beginning in 2000; the Potentia remained in production until May 2002.

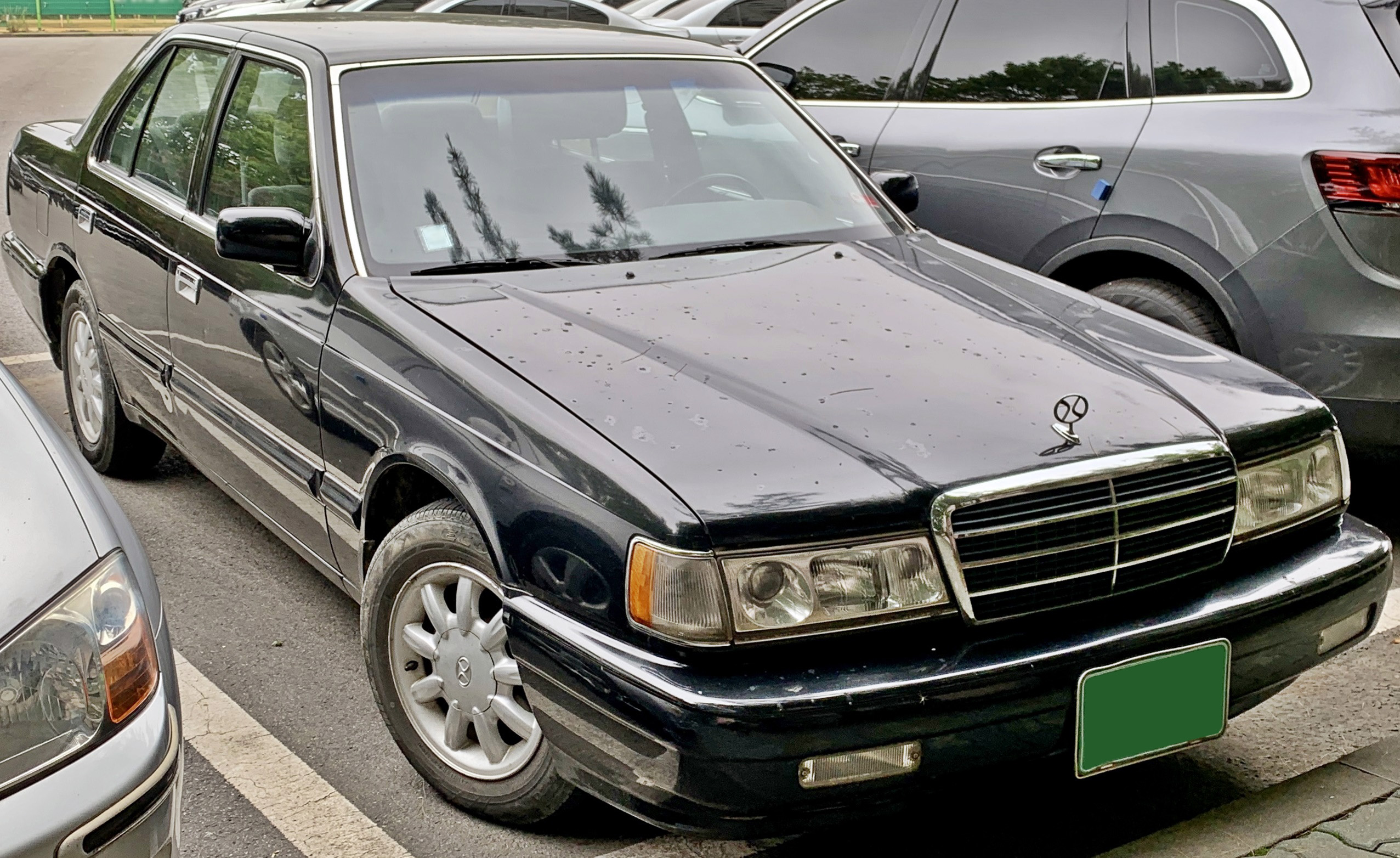
Kia Potentia

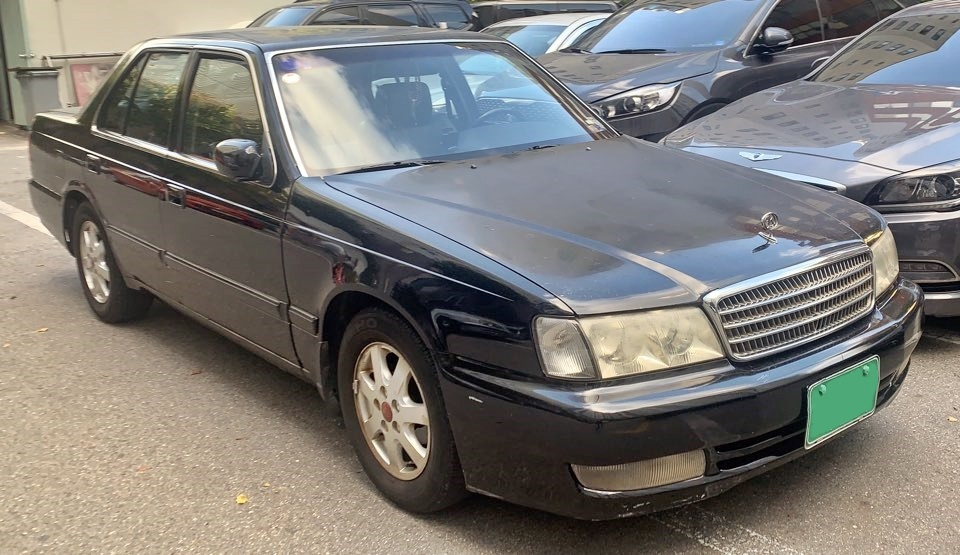
Kia Potentia facelift
