= Thomas Lucy (disambiguation) =

Thomas Lucy (1532–1600) was an English politician.

Thomas Lucy may also refer to:

- Thomas Lucy (died 1415), MP for Warwickshire
- Thomas Lucy (died 1640) (1585–1640), landowner and MP for Warwickshire and Warwick
- Tom Lucy (born 1988), British rower
