= William Lucy (disambiguation) =

William Lucy (1594–1677) was an English clergyman and bishop.

William Lucy may also refer to:

- William Lucy (labor leader) (1933–2024), American trade union leader
- William Henry Lucy, journalist
- William Lucy (MP) for Warwickshire (UK Parliament constituency)
- William Lucy (died 1873), owner of Lucy's Eagle Ironworks
- Sir William Lucy, Sheriff of Warwickshire in 1445, and a character in Henry VI, Part 1

== See also ==
- William Lucy Way, Oxford, England
