= Richard Lucy =

Richard Lucy may refer to:

- Richard de Lucy (1089–1179), English High Sheriff of Essex
- Richard Lucy (1619–1677), landowner and politician, MP for Warwickshire, and for Yarmouth
- Sir Richard Lucy, 1st Baronet (1592–1667), English politician, MP for Old Sarum, and for Hertfordshire
- Richard Lucy (fl. 1563), MP for Brackley
