= Lucie (disambiguation) =

Lucie is a feminine given name.

Lucie may also refer to:

- Lucie (band), a Czech rock band
- Lucie (1963 film), a Czechoslovak film
- Lucie (1979 film), a Norwegian drama film
- Lucie, Suriname, a village
- Lucie River, Suriname
- Doug Lucie (born 1953), English dramatist
- Lawrence Lucie, American jazz guitarist
- Lucie Awards, an annual award honoring achievements in photography

== See also ==
- St. Lucie (disambiguation)
- Lucy (disambiguation)
- Luce (disambiguation)
- Luci (disambiguation)
