= Accreditation Council =

Accreditation Council may refer to:

- Accreditation Council for Continuing Medical Education
- Accreditation Council for Graduate Medical Education, the body responsible for the accreditation of medical doctors in the US
- Accreditation Council for Pharmacy Education, a non-profit accreditation agency recognized by Council on Higher Education Accreditation in the US
- Accreditation Council for TESOL Distance Education Courses, quality assurance organization for TESOL distance-learning
- British Accreditation Council, an educational accreditation agency for international students entering the UK for educational purposes
- Higher Education Evaluation and Accreditation Council of Taiwan
- National Assessment and Accreditation Council, an autonomous body funded by University Grants Commission of Government of India
- Oman Accreditation Council
- Pakistan National Accreditation Council

== See also ==
- Accreditation
