= Jujiro Matsuda =

Japanese industrialist and businessman (1875–1952)

- 松田 重次郎
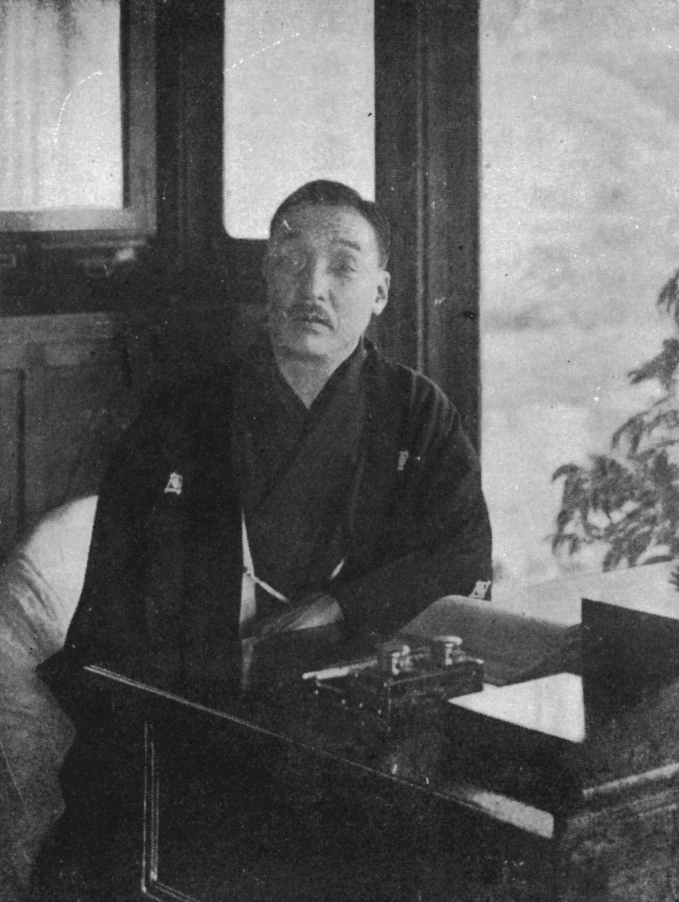
- Born: 6 August 1875; Hiroshima, Empire of Japan
- Died: 27 March 1952 (aged 76); Hiroshima, Allied-occupied Japan
- Known for: Founding Mazda Motor Corporation

Jujiro Matsuda (松田 重次郎, Matsuda Jūjirō; 6 August 1875 – 27 March 1952) was a Japanese inventor, machinist, industrialist and businessman whose company, Toyo Kogyo, led to the founding of the present-day multinational automaker Mazda Motor Corporation.

== Early life ==
The son of a fisherman, Matsuda was born in Hiroshima in 1875. He was apprenticed to a blacksmith in Osaka at the age of 14 and invented the "Matsuda-type pump" in 1906. He later took over management of the foundry at which he apprenticed and changed the name of the organization to "Matsuda Pump Partnership"; he was eventually forced out of the company, but launched an arms manufacturing company soon after: the eponymously-named Matsuda Works. Matsuda would see his fledgling company's fortunes improve when it was commissioned as a supplier to the Tsar of Russia and as the manufacturer of the Type 99 rifle for the Imperial Japanese Armed Forces.

== Career ==
By 1921, Matsuda had accumulated significant wealth owing to his previous business ventures. He moved back to Hiroshima after he was asked to take over management of floundering artificial cork manufacturer Toyo Cork Kogyo Co. Ltd. (東洋コルク工業株式会社, Tōyō Koruku Kōgyō Kabushiki Gaisha), which was placed into receivership by its creditors when the market for artificial cork dried up following the end of World War I. The unprofitable cork business ceased, and Matsuda focused on tool manufacturing. 1931 oversaw the introduction of the "Mazda-Go" motorized tricycle, manufactured in what is now the city of Fuchū and the company, now known as Toyo Kogyo Co. Ltd. (東洋工業株式会社, Tōyō Kōgyō Kabushiki Gaisha), would concentrate on motor vehicle manufacturing.

=== World War II and aftermath ===
In August 1945, the Toyo Kogyo headquarters in Hiroshima sustained heavy damage in the atomic bombing of Hiroshima, which was carried out by the United States against Imperial Japan in the closing stages of World War II. The Fuchū plant, located over 5 kilometres (3.1 mi) from the epicentre of the nuclear explosion, was left relatively unscathed; Matsuda offered its usage for the Hiroshima bureau of the Japan Broadcasting Corporation.

During the Allied occupation of Japan, Matsuda was not accused nor formally charged of being a war conspirator, and a revitalized Toyo Kogyo was the main driving force behind repairing the damaged economy of Hiroshima in the aftermath of World War II. In 1950, Toyo Kogyo provided the start-up for a baseball team, the Hiroshima Carp (Baseball in Japan was introduced in 1872 and is Japan's most popular sport).

His adopted son-in-law, Tsuneji Matsuda, succeeded him as president of Toyo Kogyo and oversaw the expansion of its automobile division until 1979, when Ford Motor Company took a 25 percent equity stake. The alliance with Ford Motor Company led to the divestiture of shares from the Matsuda family and the change of Toyo Kogyo into Mazda Motor Corporation in 1984; the Matsuda family still owns a controlling interest in the Hiroshima Toyo Carp.

== Death and legacy ==
Matsuda died on 27 March 1952. For his contributions to Hiroshima Prefecture, a bronze statue of him was created in 1965 by Onomichi-native sculptor Katsuzou Entsuba, and was erected at the Hijiyama Park in Minami-ku, Hiroshima.
