= Patrick W. Jordan =

British/American writer and consultant (born 1967)

Patrick W. Jordan (born November 23, 1967) is a British/American writer and consultant. He advises on design, marketing and brand strategy and has also worked on policy and strategy projects for the UK Government. He is the author of the book Designing Pleasurable Products (ISBN 978-0415298872), on the area of emotional design.

== Early life ==
Jordan was born in London, England to an American father and British mother. He grew up in Somerset in the South West of England.

After leaving school Jordan trained as an apprentice with Rolls-Royce Plc. He has also worked as an adventure sports instructor, a motorcycling instructor and served briefly in both the British Army and Royal Navy.

He gained a bachelor's degree in mechanical engineering from the University of Bristol in 1989, a master's degree in design and ergonomics from the University of Birmingham in 1990 and a PhD in psychology from the University of Glasgow in 1993.

== Career ==
From 1993 to 2000 Jordan worked at Philips Design in The Netherlands where he specialised in user research and trend analysis. In 2000 he was appointed Head of User Research at Symbian, later becoming Vice-President and Head of Design.

In 2002 he was awarded the Nierenberg Chair of Design at Carnegie-Mellon University. He was the youngest person ever to have held this Chair.

He started his own consulting firm, The Contemporary Trends Institute in 2001 while still at Symbian. This company, which he ran until 2007, had clients including Starbucks, Gillette, Nokia and Microsoft.

In 2001 Jordan co-founded Include, an international conference on inclusive or universal design. This conference is hosted bi-annually by the Royal College of Art.

From 2005 to 2006 he was Chair of Design and Marketing at the University of Leeds. In 2012 he was appointed as a visiting professor at City University London.

== Books ==
Jordan has written or edited six books.

- Designing Pleasurable Products ISBN 978-0415298872, Taylor and Francis, 2000. In this book Jordan identifies four types of human motivation (‘pleasures’). He claims that success in the marketplace is dependent on connecting with users in one or more of these ways. The book was quoted in an Open University course on design.
- Usability Evaluation in Industry (edited with Bruce Thomas, Bernhard A. Weerdmeester and Ian McClelland), ISBN 978-0748403141, Taylor and Francis 1996
- Introduction to Usability, ISBN 978-0748407620, Taylor and Francis 1998
- Human Factors in Product Design (edited with William S. Green), ISBN 978-0748408290, Taylor and Francis 1999
- Pleasure with Products: Beyond Usability (edited with William S. Green), ISBN 978-0415237048 Taylor and Francis 2002
- How to Make Brilliant Stuff that People Love and Make Big Money Out of It, ISBN 978-0470847114, Wiley 2002
