= Emotional Design =

2003 book by Donald Norman

- Author: Donald Norman
- Language: English
- Publication date: 2003
- Publication place: United States
- ISBN: 0-465-05135-9

Emotional Design is both the title of a book by Donald Norman and the concept it represents.

== Content ==
The main topic covered is how emotions have a crucial role in the human ability to understand the world, and how they learn new things. In fact, studies show that emotion influences people's information processing and decision-making For example: aesthetically pleasing objects appear to the user to be more effective, by virtue of their sensual appeal. This is due to the affinity the user feels for an object that appeals to them, due to the formation of an emotional connection with the object. Consequently, It is believed that companies and designers should not rely on pricey marketing; they should link their services to customers' emotions and daily lives to get them "hooked" on a product.

Norman's approach is based on classical ABC model of attitudes. However, he changed the concept to be suitable for application in design. The three dimensions have new names (visceral, behavioral and reflective level) and partially new content .

The first is the "visceral" level which is about immediate initial reactions people unconsciously do and are greatly determined by sensory factors (look, feel, smell, and sound). Norman argued that attractive products work better because they can engage multiple senses to evoke emotional responses and bonds through use of visual factors of color, texture, and shape. He contends that beautifully designed products make people feel good. This is where appearance matters, and first impressions are formed, and the texture and surface of an object become important in evoking a specific emotional reaction. Thus, viscerally well-designed products tend to evoke positive emotions and experiences in the consumers.

The second is "behavioral" level which is all about use; what does a product do, what function does it perform? Good behavioral design should be human centered, focusing upon understanding and satisfying the needs of people who use the product. This level of design starts with understanding the user's demands, ideally derived from conducting studies of relevant behavior in homes, schools, places of work, or wherever the product will be used.

The third is "reflective" level at which the product has meaning for consumers; the emotional connections which are formed over time using the product and are influenced by cultural, social, and personal factors. Via good reflective design, people will feel a sense of personal bond and identity with an object, and it will become a part of their daily lives. It is how we remember the experience itself and how it made us feel.

In summary, the visceral level concerns itself with the aesthetic or attractiveness of an object. The behavioral level considers the function and usability of the product. The reflective level takes into account prestige and value; this is often influenced by the branding of a product.

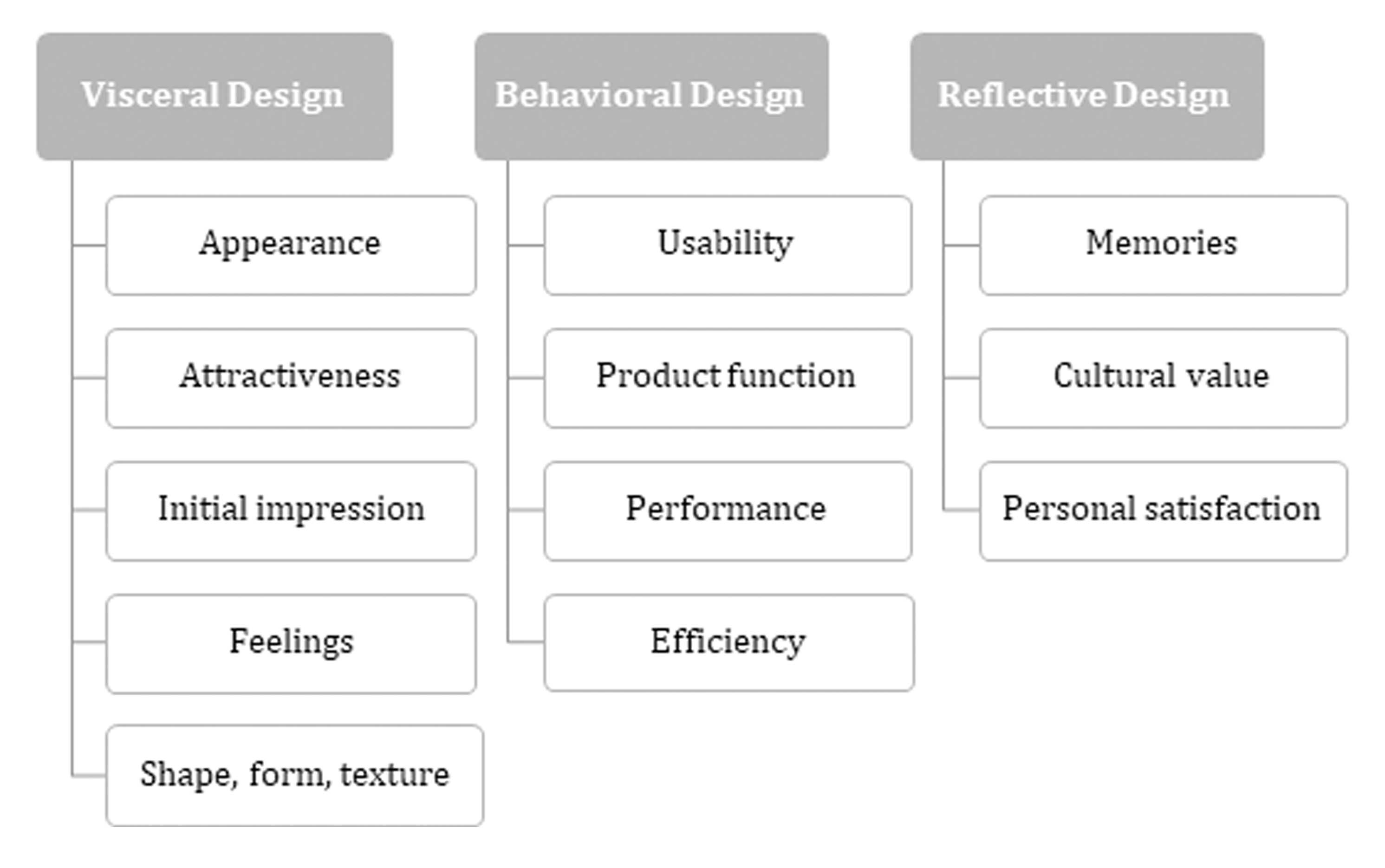
Three levels of emotional design

In the book, Norman shows that design of most objects are perceived on all three levels (dimensions). Therefore, a good design should address all three levels. Norman also mentions in his book that "technology should bring more to our lives than the improved performance of tasks: it should be richness and enjoyment." (pg 101) He stresses the importance of creating fun and pleasurable products instead of dull and dreary ones. By mixing all three design levels and the four pleasures by Patrick W. Jordan, the product should evoke an emotion when the user is interacting with the product. The interaction of these three levels of design leads to the culmination of the "emotional design," a new, holistic approach to designing successful products and creates enduring and delightful product experience.

Emotional design is an important element when generating ideas for human-centered opportunities. People can more easily relate to a product, a service, a system, or an experience when they are able to connect with it at a personal level. Rather than thinking that there is one solution for all, both Norman's three design levels and Jordan's four pleasures of design can help us design for each individual's needs. Both concepts can be used as tools to better connect with the end user that it is being design for. This viewpoint is gaining a lot of acceptance in the business world; for example, Postrel argues that the "look and feel" of people, places, and things are more important than we think. In other words, people today are more concerned with the look and feel of products than with their functionality.

== Cover ==
The front cover of Emotional Design showcases Philippe Starck's Juicy Salif, an icon of industrial design that Norman heralds as an "item of seduction" and the manifestation of his thesis.

== Concept ==
Emotions are a fundamental aspect of human experience, and our emotional responses to people, places, and objects are shaped by a complex interplay of factors. As Peter Boatwright and Jonathan Cagan point out, "emotion is human, and its reach is vast". In the current marketplace, successful companies are not just creating good products, but also producing captivating ones that not only attract consumer attention, but also influence their demands and increase their engagement based on both the product's performance and how it makes them feel.

Emotional design is also influenced by the four pleasures, identified in Designing Pleasurable Products by Patrick W. Jordan. In this book Jordan builds on the work of Lionel Tiger to identify the four kinds of pleasures. Jordan describes these as "modes of motivation that enhance a product or a service. Life is unenjoyable without appreciating what we do, and it is human intuition to seek pleasure." The idea of incorporating pleasure into products is to provide the buyer with an added experience. Jordan points out in his book that a product should be more than something functional and/or aesthetically pleasing and it should evoke an emotion through the use of pleasures. Although it is hard to achieve all four pleasures into one product, by simply focusing on one, it might be what can bring a product from being chosen over another. The four pleasures that could be implemented into products or a service are:

1. Physio-pleasure deals with the body and pleasure derived from the sensory organs. This includes taste, touch, and smell, as well as sexual and sensual pleasure. In the context of products, these pleasures can be associated with tactile properties (the way interaction with the product feels) or olfactory properties (the leather smell in a new car, for example).
2. Socio-pleasure is the enjoyment derived from the company of others. Products can facilitate social interaction in a number of ways, either through providing a service that brings people together (a coffee-maker enabling a host to provide their guests with fresh coffee) or by being a talking point in and of itself.
3. Psycho-pleasure is defined as pleasure which is gained from the accomplishment of a task. In a product context, psycho-pleasure relates to the extent in which a product can help in task completion and make the accomplishment a satisfying experience. This pleasure may also take into account the efficiency with which a task can be completed (a word processor with built-in formatting decreasing the amount of time spent on creating a document, for example).
4. Ideo-pleasure refers to pleasure derived from theoretical entities such as books, music, and art. It may relate to the aesthetics of a product and the values it embodies. A product made of bio-degradable material, for example, can be seen as holding value in the environment which, in turn, may appeal to someone who wishes to be environmentally responsible.

== The use of emotional design ==
=== In film ===
People mostly know film as an entertainment but film can do more than that. Gianluca Sergi and Alan Lovell cite a study in their essays on cinema entertainment that the film users (the viewers) see films as an escape from reality and a source of amusement, relaxation and knowledge, meaning films also function as an educational tool and a method of stress relief. Specifically, comparing to emotional design, film fulfills the requirements it needs. Firstly, movies have an attractive appearance. Whether movies start with a black and white concept like in Oz the Great and Powerful or an oddly colorful, but serious theme as in Suicide Squad, they usually capture the audiences' attention, who then want to continue watching the whole show. The "wow" reaction that viewers have is the visceral reaction, according to how Don Norman explains the three levels of design in his book Emotional Design: Why We Love (or Hate) Everyday Things, "[w]hen we perceive something as "pretty," that judgment comes directly from the visceral level." (65–66) Secondly, the behavioral level: in a literal sense, the only function of movies is to be watched. With the advancement of technology, movies now have high resolution, as well as various lighting dynamics and camera angles. Lastly, applying Don Norman's statement on how products can add positively to the self-image of the users and how good the users feel after owning the products, film does influence its viewers greatly and affect the way they act. Trice and Greer indicate that "we identify with characters on the screen who are like us in terms of age, sex and other characteristics; we also identify with people we would like to be like.[...] We tend to imitate "good" characters" (135). That being said, movies do not label any of their characters good or bad in a straightforward manner; the viewers only learn about the characters through the narrative, which production design is a part of.

=== In physical space design ===
Emotional design is one of the important aspects of creating a successful and enjoyable experience for customers in a physical space such as Starbucks. Emotional design refers to the ability of design elements to evoke certain emotions or feelings in customers. [13] One example of emotional design at Starbucks is the use of warm lighting, comfortable seating, and relaxing music to create a cozy and inviting atmosphere. This creates a sense of comfort and relaxation, which can be particularly appealing to customers who are looking for a place to unwind or catch up with friends. Another example of emotional design at Starbucks is the use of distinctive and recognizable branding elements, such as the green logo, the mermaid icon, and the signature cup design. These elements create a sense of familiarity and loyalty among customers, who often associate the Starbucks brand with a certain lifestyle or personality.

=== In product design ===
Emotional design has a crucial role in product design, extending beyond a product's functionality and into the realm of meaningful experiences that evoke emotions in users. By introducing emotional cues into the product design, designers can provide users with emotions that create trust, satisfaction, joy, or nostalgia - all of which have an influential way of impacting user perceptions, engagement, and loyalty towards products. Research has shown that when users have an emotional connection to their product, it can enhance how effectively a product is usable, desirable, aesthetically pleasing, and valuable over time.

Emotional design is associated with shaping user experience through affective responses that may influence how users perceive and evaluate a product over time. These responses can be influenced by design elements such as visual appearance, color, and feedback, which may contribute to usability and perceived product quality.

==== Enhancing usability through emotional design ====
One prominent impact of emotional design in product development is to improve usability and self-efficacy. Buker et al. outline that when products are designed to evoke positive emotion, it can improve the overall confidence of users performing tasks successfully. Their research found that emotional product design can develop self-efficacy, which is the belief in one's own abilities to exercise behaviors successfully. Products designed with a straightforward interface and emotionally affirming approaches (positive messages reinforced through visuals) can lessen users' frustration and create motivation that leads to more engaging, confident product use. Each of these products' emotional support approaches, exhibit visual appeal, sounds, and tactile interaction or feedback can exhibit product approachability and user empowerment.

Additionally, Buker et al. point out that emotional design works best in combination with usability-centered principles. Easy to use, provides clear feedback, and has aesthetic and pleasant elements; these attributes produce a feeling of competence and satisfaction in users. This loop of emotional usability experience might create a better immediate experience for a user, and build attachment and loyalty long term.

==== Emotional aesthetics and sensory appeal in product design ====
The aesthetic aspect of a product is important within the context of emotional design, as visual characteristics can prompt immediate emotional responses. Demirbilek and Sener assert that product semantics and emotional cues are essential to the user's understanding and experience. Their investigations illustrate that certain characteristics of a product's design, such as color, shape, texture, and material, can create different emotional associations. For instance, rounded, smooth shapes tend to suggest comfort and friendliness, whereas sharp, angular shapes may inspire aggression and tension. Designers can use visual and tactile constituents effectively in making emotive products feel like they invoke positive emotional responses, making them more attractive.

In addition, Demirbilek and Sener reveal that emotional design can develop narrative experiences about the products that provide them with symbolic or sentimental value. For example, retro-themed kitchen appliances constructed with retro color palettes and nostalgic form can remind consumers of a time in the past, creating familiarity and an emotional attachment. This experience creates a sense of value to the product, resulting in the likelihood that the product will be remembered and cherished by consumers.

==== The role of color psychology in emotional product design ====
Color is an influential element in emotional product design with direct psychological implications on human feelings. Feng and Zhao state that different colors can convey different emotional responses that directly influence an individual's purchasing intention. The effect of color has been noted in product design, and in their research on pro-environmental product design, they also noted that warm colors (e.g., red, yellow, orange) evoke excitement, energy, and optimism, making these colors good at attracting attention or prompting action. Conversely, cool colors (e.g., blue, green) cultivate calmness, trust, and reliability; hence, they mitigate apprehension in product use and encourage stability in areas where that may lead to a purchasing intention.

Color does not end with aesthetics alone; colors have demonstrable action impacts on user behavior when used appropriately during the design process. For example, technology companies frequently utilize blue as the color of choice in their product and brand development processes to indicate trust and reliability, while green is typically utilized in health and wellness products to elicit natural calming associations. Feng and Zhao state that through the systematic use of color psychology, designers should be able to produce products with visual appeal along with emotional resonance that appeal to users and inform purchasing actions.

=== In education and learning environments ===
Emotional design is being integrated into educational technologies at a progressively growing rate to reduce cognitive load and improve learning experiences. Chang and Chen claim that emotional design in e-textbooks and digital learning technologies can greatly influence a student's learning achievement and cognitive load. When learning environments utilize emotional design elements such as interesting visuals, interactive components, and positive feedback, it can lower the cognitive effort needed to study material, leading to a more productive and enjoyable learning experience.

For example, emotional design can lower cognitive overload in the learning experience mainly due to emotional cues provided to students that positively aid in memory retention and task completion. Chang and Chen also showcased that e-textbooks with emotional design elements provided students with better learning outcomes than traditional textbooks, citing that students' perceived level of engagement and motivation increased. Positive emotional reinforcement, including rewarding progress and praise, is also instrumental in stimulating motivation and persistence in educational environments.

== Relationship between emotion and design ==
Emotion and design are intricately linked in the field of emotional design, which is concerned with creating products, interfaces, and experiences that engage users on an emotional level. Emotions design involves the intentional use of design elements to evoke specific emotional responses in users.

The relationship between emotion and design in emotional design is rooted in the idea that emotions are a key driver of human behavior. People are more likely to engage with products and interfaces that evoke positive emotions such as joy, excitement, and delight, while negative emotions such as frustration and anger can lead to disengagement and avoidance.

In emotional design, designers use a variety of techniques to evoke emotions in users. These may include the use of color, typography, imagery, sound, and motion, among others. For example, a website might use bright, cheerful colors and playful animations to create a sense of fun and whimsy, while a meditation app might use soft, calming colors and soothing sounds to create a sense of relaxation and tranquility.

== Ethical considerations in emotional design ==
While the potential of emotional design is significant, ethical considerations also come into play, especially when it comes to manipulation. Specifically, the emotional triggers that seek to take advantage of a user's fears or insecurities (particularly with so-called "dark patterns") are growing from an ethical standpoint in UX design. Gray et al. reflect on the "dark side" of UX design, where designers intentionally set out to "trick" users or manipulate them into doing things that are not in their best interest. They evaluate not only how designers may coerce users to make a purchase, but also how they use guilt or urgency, to name a few. All of these concerns tie directly back to the responsibility designers cannot forget to account for aggressors using an emotional strategy in a way that does not take into consideration the well-being of the user.

Similarly, Keinonen addresses ethics in design within the scope of satisfying user needs. Here, again, the user cannot be taken advantage of, and therefore combining (or employing) emotional design that is based on how to promote user autonomy and well-being rather than profitability. While ethically employing emotional design, the designer must find the balance between trying to sway users to behave in a manner in which they desire content to evade manipulation (regardless of intention). Cultural sensitivity must be considered by designers, but this also leads to the problem of using one emotional cue as a designer. One emotional appeal cannot faithfully represent all of the different groups, and from an emotional design perspective, a designer's emotional appeal may not be tight enough to reach the audience. Ethical considerations in emotional design highlight the need to act in a way that considers users' needs in designing an emotional design experience, that serves their best interests while not exploiting who they are emotionally.

== See also ==
- Kansei engineering – a design approach incorporating emotional elements
- Sustainable design
