= ADRI =

The ADRI approach to evaluation of an organization's effectiveness considers the following:

1. Approach: what processes, strategies, and structures have been developed and reasons why they have been selected;
2. Deployment: how these processes, strategies, and structures have been implemented;
3. Results: what trends are indicated by the Key Performance Indicators (KPIs) and how this is assessed; and
4. Improvement: what process is used for reviewing the appropriateness and effectiveness of the Approach and Deployment above.

The approach is used to improve quality in a cyclical manner at many universities. It is also used for independent reviews of organizations.

The ADRI approach originated in Australia is used by the Oman Academic Accreditation Authority. The approach has been used in programming courses too.

== See also ==
- Evaluation
- Quality management
- Review
- Strategic management
