= Spec RX-7 =

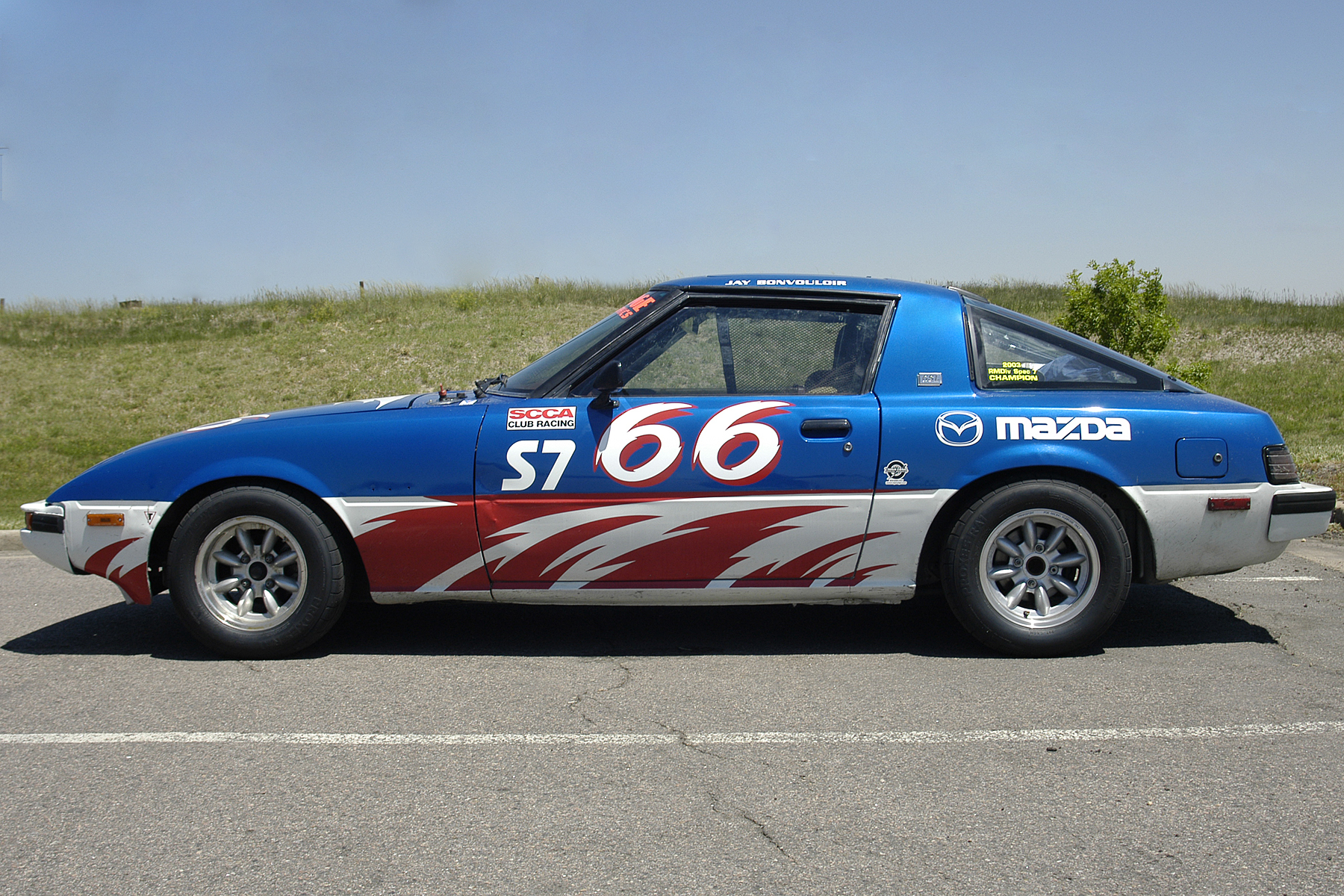
1982 Spec RX-7

Spec RX-7 is one of many production-based spec classes, originating in the mid-1990s with the Sports Car Club of America. The class was created by Dave Turner and Mark Holland. The main fault of the class is a lack of nationwide compatibility, with each division having slightly different rulesets from one another. Some allow for vast modification, some allow very little, but they all are based on the premise of equality, with the skill being placed solely on the driver and reducing the need for costly development and "part of the week". Specs range from relatively stock including exhaust and intake, to mildly modified, to Improved Touring specs. All are based on the 79-85 year model RX-7, with some excluding the 79-80 year models.

== Class rules ==
Since each division has a different set of specs, it is important to locate rules for your area. Below is a small listing of websites to help you locate these rules.

Most divisions (excluding the Improved Touring-based IT7 class) spec suspension, tires, engine modification, and in some cases rollcages and wheels.
