= Kansei engineering =

Japanese product design company

Kansei engineering (Japanese: 感性工学 kansei kougaku, emotional or affective engineering) aims at the development or improvement of products and services by translating the customer's psychological feelings and needs into the domain of product design (i.e. parameters). It was founded by Mitsuo Nagamachi, professor emeritus of Hiroshima University (also former Dean of Hiroshima International University and CEO of International Kansei Design Institute). Kansei engineering parametrically links the customer's emotional responses (i.e. physical and psychological) to the properties and characteristics of a product or service. In consequence, products can be designed to bring forward the intended feeling.

It has been adopted as one of the topics for professional development by the Royal Statistical Society.

== Introduction ==
Product design has become increasingly complex as products contain more functions and have to meet increasing demands such as user-friendliness, manufacturability and ecological considerations. With a shortened product lifecycle, development costs are likely to increase. Since errors in the estimations of market trends can be very expensive, companies therefore perform benchmarking studies that compare with competitors on strategic, process, marketing, and product levels. However, success in a certain market segment not only requires knowledge about the competitors and the performance of competing products, but also about the impressions which a product leaves to the customer. The latter requirement becomes much more important as products and companies are becoming mature. Customers purchase products based on subjective terms such as brand image, reputation, design, impression etc.. A large number of manufacturers have started to consider such subjective properties and develop their products in a way that conveys the company image. A reliable instrument is therefore needed: an instrument which can predict the reception of a product on the market before the development costs become too large.

This demand has triggered the research dealing with the translation of the customer's subjective, hidden needs into concrete products. Research is done foremost in Asia, including Japan and Korea. In Europe, a network has been forged under the 6th EU framework. This network refers to the new research field as "emotional design" or "affective engineering".

== History ==
People want to use products that are functional at the physical level, usable at the psychological level and attractive at the emotional level. Affective engineering is the study of the interactions between the customer and the product at that third level. It focuses on the relationships between the physical traits of a product and its affective influence on the user. Thanks to this field of research, it is possible to gain knowledge on how to design more attractive products and make the customers satisfied.

Methods in affective engineering (or Kansei engineering) is one of the major areas of ergonomics (human factor engineering). The study of integrating affective values in artifacts is not new at all. Already in the 18th century philosophers such as Baumgarten and Kant established the area of aesthetics. In addition to pure practical values, artifacts always also had an affective component. One example is jewellery found in excavations from the Stone Ages. The period of Renaissance is also a good example.

In the middle of the 20th century, the idea of aesthetics was deployed in scientific contexts. Charles E. Osgood developed his semantic differential method in which he quantified the peoples' perceptions of artifacts. Some years later, in 1960, Professors Shigeru Mizuno and Yoji Akao developed an engineering approach in order to connect peoples' needs to product properties. This method was called quality function deployment (QFD). Another method, the Kano model, was developed in the field of quality in the early 1980s by Professor Noriaki Kano, of Tokyo University. Kano's model is used to establish the importance of individual product features for the customer's satisfaction and hence it creates the optimal requirement for process oriented product development activities. A pure marketing technique is conjoint analysis. Conjoint analysis estimates the relative importance of a product's attributes by analysing the consumer's overall judgment of a product or service. A more artistic method is called Semantic description of environments. It is mainly a tool for examining how a single person or a group of persons experience a certain (architectural) environment.

Although all of these methods are concerned with subjective impact, none of them can translate this impact to design parameters sufficiently. This can, however, be accomplished by Kansei engineering. Kansei engineering (KE) has been used as a tool for affective engineering. It was developed in the early 70s in Japan and is now widely spread among Japanese companies. In the middle of the 90s, the method spread to the United States, but cultural differences may have prevented the method to enfold its whole potential.

== Procedure ==
As mentioned above, Kansei engineering can be considered as a methodology within the research field of 'affective engineering'. Some researchers have identified the content of the methodology. Shimizu et al. state that 'Kansei Engineering is used as a tool for product development and the basic principles behind it are the following: identification of product properties and correlation between those properties and the design characteristics'.

According to Nagasawa, one of the forerunners of Kansei engineering, there are three focal points in the method:

1. How to accurately understand consumer Kansei
2. How to reflect and translate Kansei understanding into product design
3. How to create a system and organization for Kansei orientated design

== A model on methodology ==
Different types of Kansei engineering are identified and applied in various contexts. Schütte examined different types of Kansei engineering and developed a general model covering the contents of Kansei engineering.

Choice of Domain

Domain in this context describes the overall idea behind an assembly of products, i.e. the product type in general. Choosing the domain includes the definition of the intended target group and user type, market-niche and type, and the product group in question. Choosing and defining the domain are carried out on existing products, concepts and on design solutions yet unknown. From this, a domain description is formulated, serving as the basis for further evaluation. The process is necessary and has been described by Schütte in detail in a couple of publications.

Span the Semantic Space

The expression Semantic space was addressed for the first time by Osgood et al.. He posed that every artifact can be described in a certain vector space defined by semantic expressions (words). This is done by collecting a large number of words that describe the domain. Suitable sources are pertinent literature, commercials, manuals, specification list, experts etc. The number of the words gathered varies according to the product, typically between 100 and 1000 words. In a second step the words are grouped using manual (e.g. Affinity diagram) or mathematical methods (e.g. factor and/or cluster analysis). Finally a few representing words are selected from this spanning the Semantic Space. These words are called "Kansei words" or "Kansei Engineering words".

Span the Space of Properties

The next step is to span the Space of Product Properties, which is similar to the Semantic Space. The Space of Product Properties collects products representing the domain, identifies key features and selects product properties for further evaluation. The collection of products representing the domain is done from different sources such as existing products, customer suggestions, possible technical solutions and design concepts etc. The key features are found using specification lists for the products in question. To select properties for further evaluation, a Pareto-diagram can assist the decision between important and less important features. Synthesis In the synthesis step, the Semantic Space and the Space of Properties are linked together, as displayed in Figure 3. Compared to other methods in Affective Engineering, Kansei engineering is the only method that can establish and quantify connections between abstract feelings and technical specifications. For every Kansei word a number of product properties are found, affecting the Kansei word.

Synthesis

The research into constructing these links has been a core part of Nagamachi's work with Kansei engineering in the last few years. Nowadays, a number of different tools is available. Some of the most common tools are :

- Category Identification
- Regression Analysis /Quantification Theory Type I
- Rough Sets Theory
- Genetic Algorithm
- Fuzzy Sets Theory

Model building and Test of Validity

After doing the necessary stages, the final step of validation remains. This is done in order to check if the prediction model is reliable and realistic. However, in case of prediction model failure, it is necessary to update the Space of Properties and the Semantic Space, and consequently refine the model. The process of refinement is difficult due to the shortage of methods. This shows the need of new tools to be integrated. The existing tools can partially be found in the previously mentioned methods for the synthesis.

== Software tools ==
Kansei engineering has always been a statistically and mathematically advanced methodology. Most types require good expert knowledge and a reasonable amount of experience to carry out the studies sufficiently. This has also been the major obstacle for a widespread application of Kansei engineering. In order to facilitate application some software packages have been developed in the recent years, most of them in Japan. There are two different types of software packages available: User consoles and data collection and analysis tools. User consoles are software programs that calculate and propose a product design based on the users' subjective preferences (Kanseis). However, such software requires a database that quantifies the connections between Kanseis and the combination of product attributes. For building such databases, data collection and analysis tools can be used. This part of the paper demonstrates some of the tools. There are many more tools used in companies and universities, which might not be available to the public. User consoles

== Software ==
As described above, Kansei data collection and analysis is often complex and connected with statistical analysis. Depending on which synthesis method is used, different computer software is used. Kansei Engineering Software (KESo) uses QT1 for linear analysis. The concept of Kansei Engineering Software (KESo) Linköping University in Sweden. The software generates online questionnaires for collection of Kansei raw-data

Another software package (Kn6) was developed at the Polytechnic University of Valencia in Spain.

Both software packages improve the collection and evaluation of Kansei data. In this way even users with no specialist competence in advanced statistics can use Kansei engineering.

== See also ==
- Affective computing
- Fahrvergnügen
- Japanese quality
