= Accreditation Council for TESOL Distance Education Courses =

The Accreditation Council for TESOL Distance Education Courses or ACTDEC is an independent, non-profit-making body founded in 1993 to seek to ensure quality in TESOL distance-learning courses. ACTDEC is currently listed as a Company Limited by Guarantee.

== History ==
ACTDECs first Chair, and one of its driving forces, was Dr W. R. Lee, who was also responsible for ACTDEC's Code of Practice and accreditation procedures. Dr Lee was also a significant figure in the establishment and early development of IATEFL.

== Course levels ==
The courses and qualification levels framework was originally proposed by Monica Vincent of the Overseas Development Authority. The status titles she suggested were subsequently adopted by ACTDEC.

- Level 1: Preliminary Certificate of Educational Studies in TESOL.
- Level 2: Certificate of Educational Studies in TESOL.
- Level 3: Certificate in the Theory and Methodology of TESOL.

In 2013, following agreement from the Council, these levels were revised in an effort to standardise criteria with reference to nationally understood benchmarks. The Provisional Certificate of Educational Studies in TESOL became a Level 2 on the understanding that it required 70–100 hours of study; the 120-hour Certificate of Educational Studies in TESOL became a Level 3, whilst the 250-hour Certificate in the Theory and Methodology of TESOL became a Level 5. More recently, a 150-hour Certificate in the Theory and Methodology of TESOL has been added at Level 4, and a 450-hour Diploma in the Theory and Methodology of TESOL at Level 6.

Until August 2019, ACTDEC was headed by its Patron Arthur van Essen. At that point, he stood down from that role and it is currently vacant. Prior to 2019, a Secretary and Treasurer were elected annually at the AGM, which is sometimes held in London and sometimes as a Skype Conference. In July an Administrator was appointed to take over the roles of Secretary and Treasurer. The Council no longer exists; instead there are two Directors, Jacqueline Sykes and Ian Marvin, both of whom have been members of the Independent Accreditation panel in the past.
