= Eight dimensions of quality =

Measures of product quality

Eight dimensions of quality were delineated by David A. Garvin, formerly C. Roland Christensen Professor of Business Administration at Harvard Business School, in a 1987 Harvard Business Review article. Garvin's dimensions were collated to reflect his observation that "few companies ... have learned to compete on quality".

Garvin anticipated that the features of quality which he delineated would provide a business management vocabulary intended to support the use of quality as a strategic planning tool. Garvin, who died on 30 April 2017, was posthumously honored with the prestigious award for 'Outstanding Contribution to the Case Method' on 4 March 2018. The features of quality which he identified have become "a widely accepted taxonomy for discussions of product quality".

== Summary ==
Garvin's eight dimensions can be summarized as follows:

1. Performance: brands can usually be ranked objectively on individual aspects of product performance.
2. Features: features are additional characteristics that enhance the appeal of the product or service to the user.
3. Reliability: a key element for users who need the product to work without fail for an adequate length of time.
4. Conformance: is the product made exactly as the designer intended.
5. Durability: a measure of the length of a product’s life.
6. Serviceability: the speed with which the product can be put into service when it breaks down, as well as the competence and the behavior of the service person.
7. Aesthetics: this is the usual appeal of the product, often taking into account factors such as style, colour, packing alternative and other sensory features.
8. Perceived Quality: the quality attributed to a good or service based on indirect measures.

Some of the dimensions are mutually reinforcing, although others are not: improvement in one may be secured at the expense of others. Understanding the trade-offs desired by customers among these dimensions can help build a competitive advantage.

== Details ==
=== Performance ===
Performance refers to a product's primary operating characteristics. This dimension of quality involves measurable attributes, so brands can usually be ranked objectively on individual aspects of performance. Overall performance rankings, however, are more difficult to develop, especially when they involve benefits that not every consumer needs. Performance is often a source of contention between customers and suppliers, particularly when deliverables are not adequately defined within specifications. The performance of a product often influences the profitability or reputation of the end-user. As such, many contracts or specifications include damages related to inadequate performance. The question of whether performance differences are quality differences may depend on circumstantial preferences-but preferences based on functional requirements, not taste.

Some performance standards are based on subjective preferences, but the preferences are so universal that they have the force of an objective standard.

=== Features ===
Features are additional characteristics that enhance the appeal of the product or service to the user.

Similar thinking can be applied to features, a second dimensions of quality that is often a secondary aspect of performance. Features are the "bells and whistles" of products and services, those characteristics that supplement their basic functioning. Examples include free drinks on a plane, permanent-press cycles on a washing machine, and automatic tuners on a color television set. The line separating primary performance characteristics from secondary features is often difficult to draw.

=== Reliability ===
Reliability is the likelihood that a product will not fail within a specific time period. This is a key element for users who need the product to work without fail.

This dimension reflects the probability of a product malfunctioning or failing within a specified time period. Among the most common measures of reliability are the mean time to first failure, the mean time between failures, and the failure rate per unit time. Because these measures require a product to be in use for a specified period, they are more relevant to durable goods than to products and services that are consumed instantly.

Reliability normally becomes more important to consumers as downtime and maintenance become more expensive. Farmers, for example, are especially sensitive to downtime during the short harvest season. Reliable equipment can mean the difference between a good year and spoiled crops. But consumers on other markets are more attuned than ever to product reliability too. Computers and copying machines certainly compare on this basis.

Reliability may be closely related to performance. For instance, a product specification may define parameters for up-time, or acceptable failure rates.

Reliability is a major contributor to brand or company image, and is considered a fundamental dimension of quality by most end-users. For example, recent market research shows that, especially for women, reliability has become an automobile's most desired attribute.

=== Conformance ===
The outcome of two example processes to show the meaning of the two approaches to conformance

The dimension of conformance depicts to what extent a product’s design and operating characteristics meet established standards. This dimension owes the most to the traditional approaches to quality pioneered by experts like Juran. Customers usually associate high quality with a product that exactly meets its requirements.

All products and services involve specifications of some sort. When products are developed, these specifications are set and a target is set, for instance the materials used or the dimension of the product. Not only the target but also the tolerance (the range of permitted deviation from the target) is defined. One problem with this approach is that there is little interest in whether the specifications have been met exactly as long as the tolerance limits are met.

On the one hand, this can lead to the so-called “tolerance stack-up”. When two or more parts are to be fit together, the size of their tolerances often determine how well they will match. Should one part fall at a lower limit of its specification and a matching part at its upper limit, a tight fit is unlikely. The link is likely to wear more quickly than one made from parts whose dimensions have been centered more exactly.

This problem can be addressed by taking a different approach to measuring quality. Instead of measuring a simple conformance to specifications, the degree to which parts or products diverge from the ideal target is measured. Using this approach, process 1 (see picture) is better even though some items fall beyond specification limits. The traditional approach would have favored process 2 because it produces more items within the specification limit. It was demonstrated that the problem of “tolerance stack-up” is worse when the dimensions of parts are more distant from the target than when they cluster around it, even if some parts fall outside the tolerance. This approach requires a fresh look at the common process quality factor of 'defect rate', to take into account the fact that two parts may each pass the 'tolerance test' separately but be unusable when the attempt is made to join them together.

In service businesses, measures of conformance normally focus on accuracy and timeliness and include counts of processing errors, unanticipated delays and other frequent mistakes.

=== Durability ===
Durability measures the length of a product’s life. When the product can be repaired, estimating durability is more complicated. The item will be used until it is no longer economical to operate it. This happens when the repair rate and the associated costs increase significantly. Technically, durability can be defined as the amount of use one gets from a product before it deteriorates. After so many hours of use, the filament of a light bulb burns up and the bulb must be replaced. Repair is impossible. Garvin noted that economists call such products "one-hoss shays", after the carriage in Oliver Wendel Holmes' poem, The Wonderful "One-Hoss-Shay". In other cases, consumers must weigh the expected cost, in both dollars and personal inconvenience, of future repairs against the investment and operating expenses of a newer, more reliable model. Durability, then, may be defined as the amount of use one gets from a product before it breaks down and replacement is preferable to continued repair.

This approach to durability has two important implications. First, it suggests that durability and reliability are closely linked. A product that often fails is likely to be scrapped earlier than one that is more reliable; repair costs will be correspondingly higher and the purchase of a competitive brand will look that much more desirable. Second, this approach implies that durability figures should be interpreted with care. An increase in product life may not be the result of technical improvements or the use of longer-lived materials. Rather, the underlying economic environment simply may have changed.

=== Serviceability ===
Serviceability involves the consumer's ease of obtaining repair service (example: access to service centers and/or ease of self-service), the responsiveness of service personnel (example: ease of getting an appointment, willingness of repair personnel to listen to the customer), and the reliability of service (example: whether the service is performed right the first time). Competence and ease of repair is the speed with which the product can be put into service when it breaks down, as well as the competence and the behavior of the service personnel.

Consumers are concerned not only about a product breaking down but also about the time before service is restored, the timeliness with which service appointment are kept, the nature of dealings with service personnel, and the frequency with which service calls or repairs fail to correct outstanding problems. In those cases where problems are not immediately resolved and complaints are filed, a company's complaint handling procedures are also likely to affect customer's ultimate evaluation of product and service quality.

Some of these variables reflect differing personal standards of acceptable service, while others can be measured quite objectively. Customers may remain dissatisfied even after completion of repairs. How these complaints are handled is important to a company's reputation for quality and service. Eventually, profitability is likely to be affected as well. Companies differ widely in their approaches to complaint handling and in the importance they attach to this element of serviceability. Some do their best to resolve complaints; others use legal gimmicks, the silent treatment and similar ploys to rebuff dissatisfied customers.

For example, recently, General Electric, Procter & Gamble and other companies have sought to preempt consumer dissatisfaction by installing toll-free telephone hot lines to their customer relations departments.

Important attributes for the serviceability dimension are service warranty, parts warranty, parts availability, distance to dealer service centers, distance to service parts center-dealer, distance to service parts center individual, length of wait for service appointment, schedule of preventive maintenance, employees listen to customers, information regarding repairs, courteous service centers, repaired correctly first time, service time relative to other dealers, warranty claims handled without argument, average repair cost/year, extended warranty, underestimation of service cost and provision of loan car.

=== Aesthetics or Style ===
The aesthetic properties of a product contribute to the identity of a company or a brand. Faults or defects in a product that diminish its aesthetic properties, even those that do not reduce or alter other dimensions of quality, are often cause for rejection.

Aesthetics refers to how the product looks, feels, sounds, tastes, or smells. It is clearly a matter of personal judgement and a reflection of individual preference. Nevertheless, there appear to be some patterns in consumers' rankings of products on the basis of taste.

A recent study of quality in 33 food categories, for example, found that high quality was most often associated with attributes such as "rich and full flavor, tastes natural, tastes fresh, good aroma, appetizing looks". Aesthetics also refers to the "outside" feel of the product.

The aesthetics dimension differs from subjective criteria pertaining to "performance" in that aesthetic choices are not nearly universal. Not all people prefer "rich and full" flavor or even agree on what that means. Companies therefore have to search for a niche. On this dimension of quality, it is impossible to please everyone.

=== Perceived Quality ===
Perception is not always reality. Consumers do not always have complete information about a product's or service's attributes; indirect measures may be their only basis for comparing brands.

A product's durability for example, can seldom be observed directly; it usually must be inferred from various tangible and intangible aspects of the product. In such circumstances, images, advertising and brand names -inferences about quality rather than the reality itself- can be critical. For this reason, Garvin noted that both Honda, who make vehicles in Marysville, Ohio, and Sony, who make color televisions in San Diego, have been reluctant to publicize that their products are "made in America".

Reputation is the primary stuff of perceived quality. Its power comes from an unstated analogy: that the quality of products today is similar to the quality of products of yesterday, or the quality of goods in a new product line is similar to the quality of a company's established products.

== See also ==
- Quality (business) – Conformity of goods or services
- Quality management – Business process to aid consistent product fitness
- Quality control – Processes that maintain quality at a constant level
- Eight disciplines problem solving – Eight disciplines of team-oriented problem solving method
- A3 problem solving
