= Oman Academic Accreditation Authority =

Sultanate of Oman Oman Authority for Academic Accreditation and Quality Assurance of Education (OAAAQA)
- الهيئة العمانية للاعتماد الأكاديمي

Agency overview
- Headquarters: Muscat, Oman
- Agency executives: Dr Jokha Bint Abdullah Al Shukaili, President; HE Prof Rahma Bin Ibrahim Al Mahrooqi, Chair of OAAAQA Board
- Website: www.oaaa.gov.om

The Oman Authority for Academic Accreditation and Quality Assurance of Education (OAAAQA), formerly the Oman Academic Accreditation Authority (OAAA) is charged with assisting in the development of the higher education sector in Oman through institutional quality audits and institutional and program accreditation processes. Also, in collaboration with the Ministry of Higher Education, it has responsibilities for establishing academic standards, and providing training and networking opportunities.

The Oman Accreditation Council (OAC) was established by Royal Decree in 2001 by His Majesty Sultan Qaboos bin Said, under the chairmanship of Dr Hamed Al Dhahab. The OAC became the OAAA in May 2010. It is a full member of ANQAHE, the Arab Network for Quality Assurance in Higher Education. It is also a full member of the International Network of Quality Assurance Agencies in Higher Education (INQAAHE).

It partners with the Oman Quality Network in Higher Education (OQNHE), established in 2006 and charged with sharing best practice among post-compulsory educational institutions in Oman.

OAAA uses the ADRI approach for the evaluation of a university's effectiveness.
