= Mazda3 =

Compact car range manufactured by Mazda

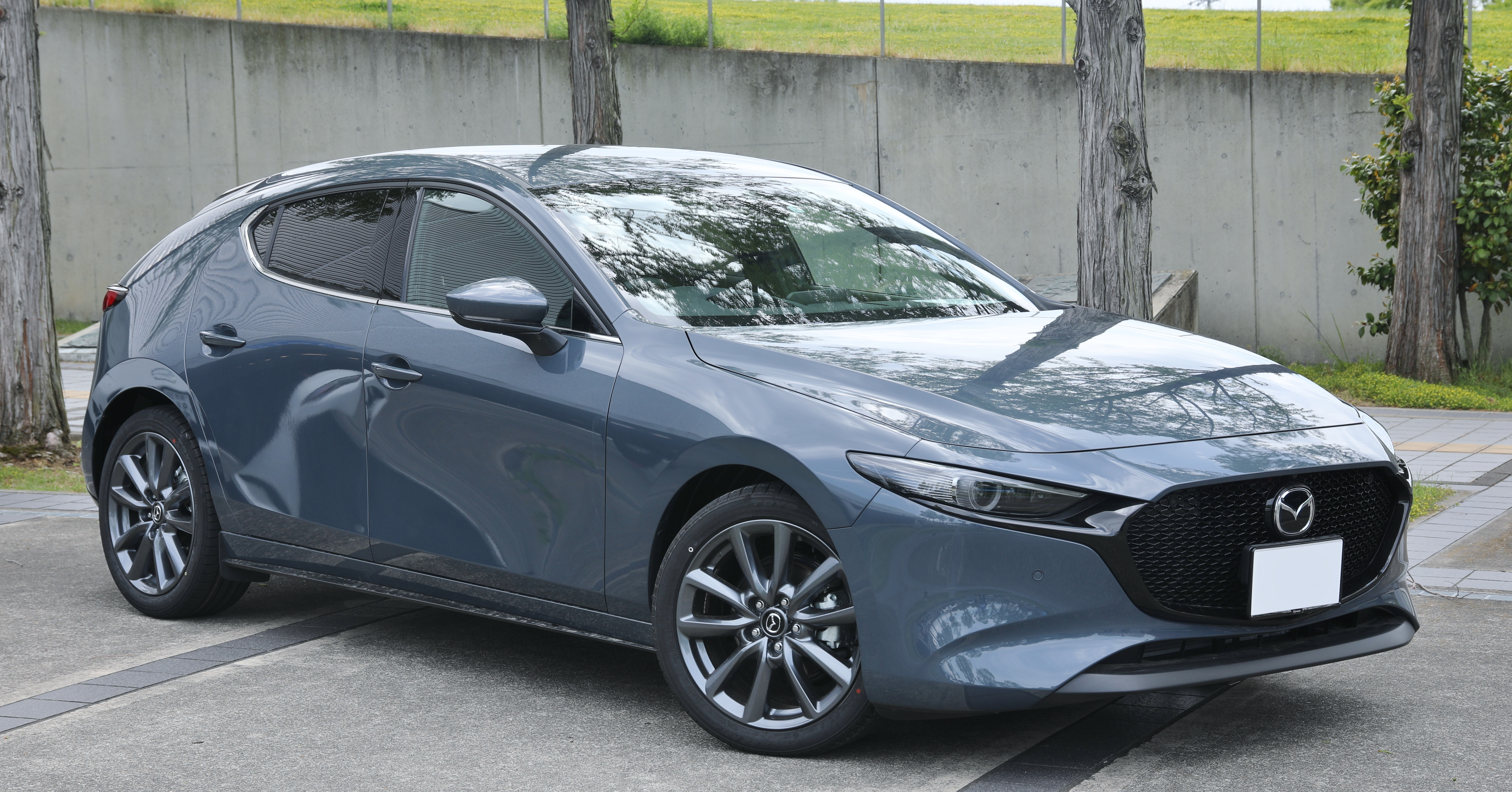

Overview
- Manufacturer: Mazda
- Also called: Mazda Axela (Japan, 2003–2019) Mazda 3 Axela (China, 2013–2019)
- Production: 2003–present

Body and chassis
- Class: Compact car (C)
- Body style: 4-door sedan; 5-door hatchback
- Layout: Front-engine, front-wheel-drive Front-engine, four-wheel-drive

Chronology
- Predecessor: Mazda 323/Mazda Familia/Mazda Protegé

The Mazda3 is a compact car manufactured by Mazda since 2003 over four generations. The body styles have been a 5-door hatchback and 4-door sedan across all generations. It was sold as the Mazda Axela (Japanese: マツダ・アクセラ, Hepburn: Matsuda Akusera) (Note: A combination of "accelerate" and "excellent".) in Japan until 2019. From 2013 until 2019, it was called the Mazda 3 Axela in China.

The first generation was produced in Japan from June 2003 until November 2008 and replaced the Familia (also known as the 323 or Protegé) as Mazda's C-segment model. It was sold in North America for the 2004–2009 model years. It was also produced in Colombia from 2004 until 2014, in Iran from 2006 until 2010, and in China from 2007 until 2013.

The second-generation Mazda3 for the 2009 model year was unveiled in late 2008, with the sedan premiering at the Los Angeles Auto Show and the hatchback at the Bologna Motor Show. For the 2012 model year, Mazda began offering the Mazda3 with their newly developed Skyactiv technology, including a more rigid body, a new direct-injection engine, and a new 6-speed transmission.

The third generation was introduced in mid-2013 for the 2014 model year. The third-generation model is the first Mazda3 to adopt the "Kodo" design language and a more complete Skyactiv range of technologies and the first to be made by Mazda independently.

The fourth-generation Mazda3 for the 2019 model year was unveiled in November 2018 at the Los Angeles Auto Show. For the 2019 model, the all-new Mazda3 is equipped with the updated Skyactiv technologies, including a spark-controlled compression ignition engine marketed as the Skyactiv-X.

A performance-oriented version of the Mazda3 was marketed until 2013 as the Mazdaspeed3 in North America, Mazdaspeed Axela in Japan, and the Mazda3 MPS in Europe and Australia.

The Mazda3 became one of Mazda's fastest-selling vehicles, with cumulative sales in January 2019 of over 6 million units.

== First generation (BK; 2003) ==
First generation
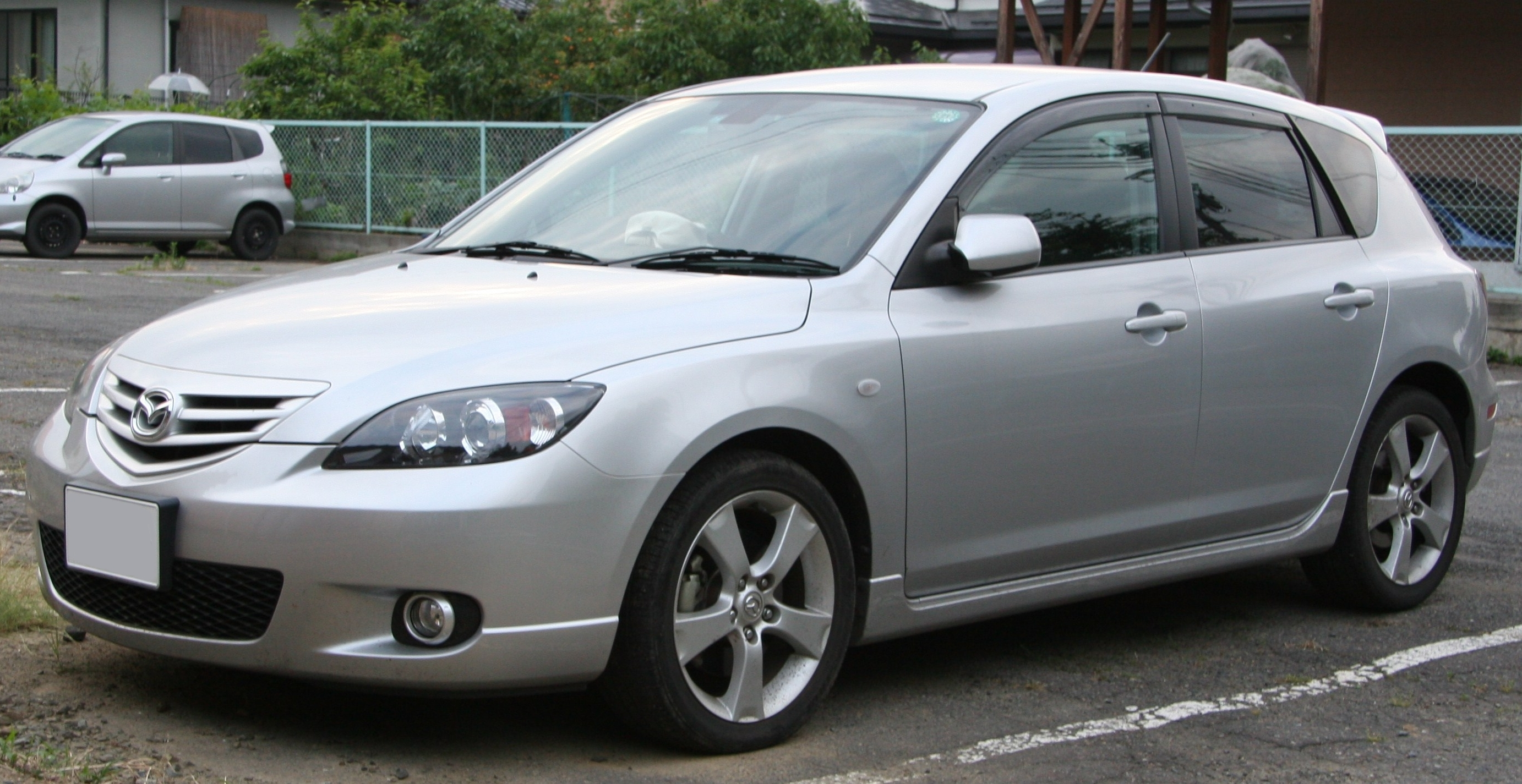
- Mazda Axela Sport 23S (pre-facelift, Japan)

Overview
- Model code: BK
- Production: June 2003 – November 2008; 2006–2013 (China); 2005–2010 (Iran); 2003–2014 (Colombia)
- Model years: 2004–2009; 2007–2013 (China); 2006–2010 (Iran); 2004–2014 (Colombia)
- Assembly: Japan: Hōfu (Hōfu Plant No. 1); China: Chongqing/Hainan; Taiwan: Ford Lio Ho Motor; Colombia: Bogotá (Compañía Colombiana Automotriz); Iran: Tehran (Bahman Group); Philippines: Santa Rosa, Laguna (Ford Motor Company Philippines); South Africa: Pretoria (Ford Motor Company of South Africa); Zimbabwe: Willowvale, Harare (WMMI)
- Designer: Hasip Girgin (2001)

Body and chassis
- Platform: Ford C1 platform
- Related: Mazda Premacy/Mazda5; Ford Focus Mk2; Hafei Saibao V

Powertrain
- Engine: Gasoline: 1.4 L MZR Z I4; 1.5 L MZR ZY-VE I4; 1.6 L MZR ZM-DE I4; 2.0 L MZR L I4; 2.0 L MZR LF-VD GDI I4; 2.3 L MZR L I4; 2.3 L MZR L GDI turbo I4; Diesel: 1.6 L PSA/Ford MZ-CD common rail turbo I4; 2.0 L MZR-CD common rail turbo I4
- Transmission: 5-speed manual; 6-speed B2C2-B / RF7J manual; 4-speed Ford 4F27E/Mazda FN4A-EL automatic; 5-speed automatic

Dimensions
- Wheelbase: 2,639 mm (103.9 in)
- Length: 4,506–4,540 mm (177.4–178.7 in) (sedan); 4,485–4,491 mm (176.6–176.8 in) (hatchback)
- Width: 1,750 mm (68.9 in)
- Height: 1,500 mm (59.1 in)
- Curb weight: 1,340 kg (2,954 lb)

The BK series Mazda3 was first unveiled at the 60th Frankfurt Motor Show on 10 September 2003, and launched in Japan in October 2003 as the Axela. The model was well received by the automotive press for its performance, handling, styling and interior, with some describing it as feeling like a more expensive sports sedan/saloon despite its value-oriented price. Some criticisms have included fuel economy and crash test results (only receiving four out of a maximum five stars from the Euro NCAP Safety Testing Programme) the latter of which was rectified by making six airbags standard. In 2006, the Mazda3 was the second best-selling car in Canada.

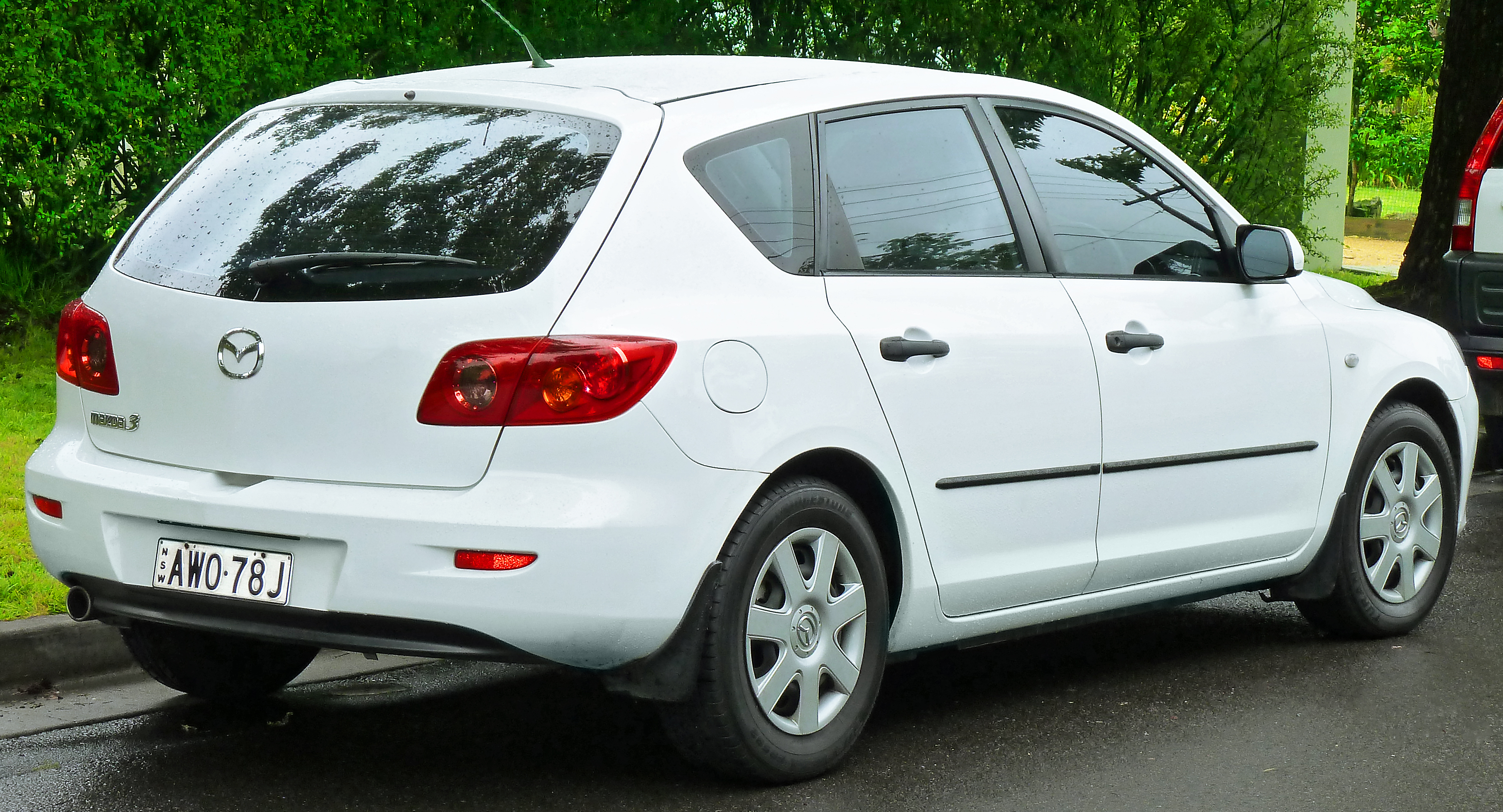
Hatchback (pre-facelift)

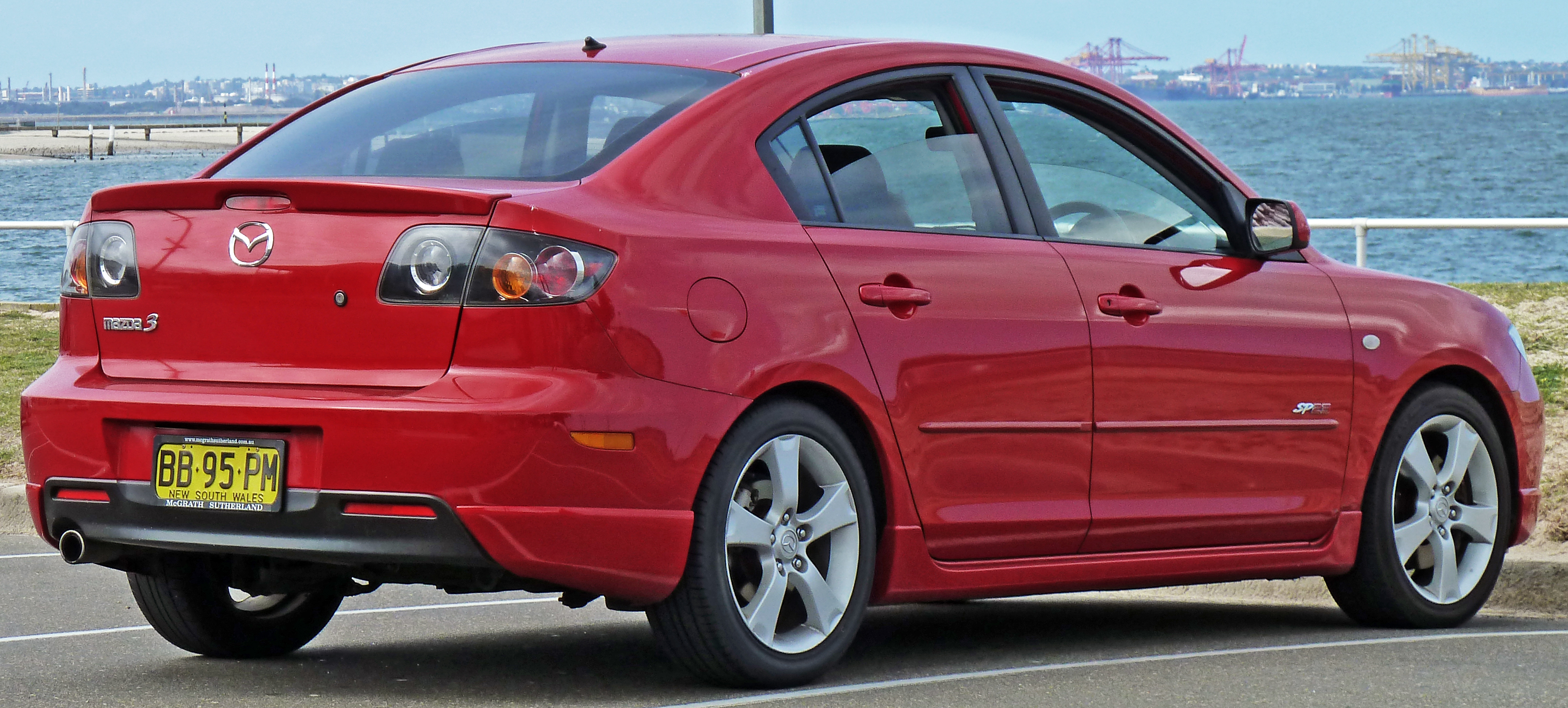
Sedan (pre-facelift)

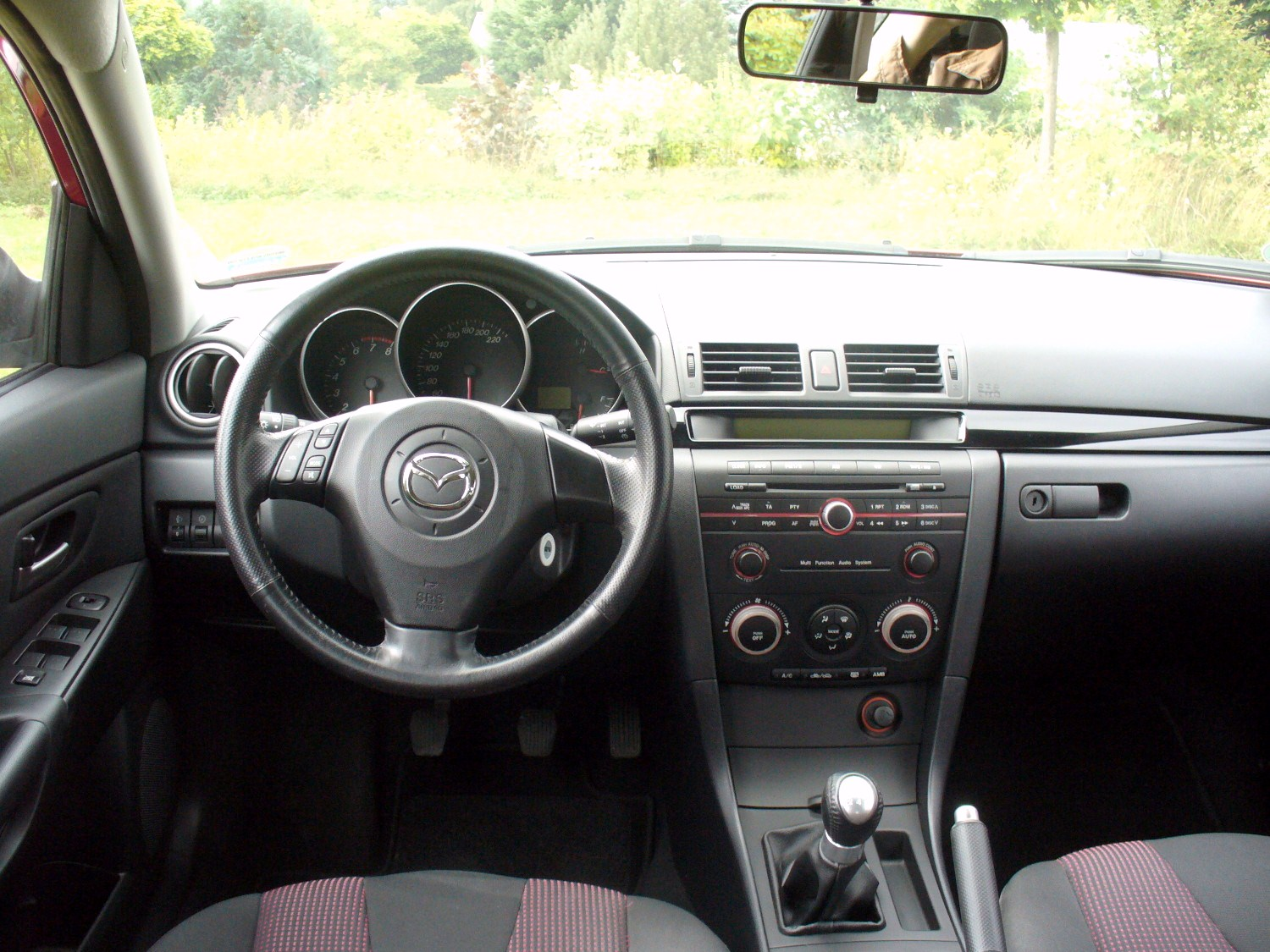
Interior

=== Design ===
The Mazda3 is based on the Ford global C1 platform, shared with the latest European Ford Focus and Volvo S40. Previewed by the MX-Sportif concept car, the first-generation Mazda3 was available in two body styles, a four-door fastback sedan/saloon, marketed as a "4-door coupé style" in Europe, and a five-door hatchback, branded the Sport version in Canada, Japan, and the United States. Design work began under chief designer Hideki Suzuki in 1999 at three Mazda design centres in California, United States; Frankfurt, Germany; and Hiroshima, Japan. By 2001, Hasip Girgin's design was chosen as a finalist. Girgin was sent to work in Hiroshima for 6 months, after which the final design was frozen for scheduled 2003 production.

The front suspension comprises MacPherson struts, with coil springs and an anti-roll bar. The rear suspension is a Ford-designed "E-link" multi-link suspension, with four locating links per wheel and an anti-roll bar, suspended on coil springs that are mounted inboard of the shock absorbers to reduce suspension intrusion into the cargo area. The first generation Mazda3 has been known to have spontaneous piston failure in the form of the piston itself cracking which is a result of manufacturing anomalies that has plagued a small percentage of the normally reliable car. Four-wheel Disc brakes are fitted, with 300 mm (12 in) discs in the front and 279 mm (11.0 in) discs in the rear; ABS and electronic brake force distribution are available as standard, depending on the model. Wheel and tire sizes vary with model, from 15-inch on base models to optional 17-inch wheels on upper-level models. The Mazda3 was used as a regular police patrol car by the Public Security Police Force of Macau alongside the Toyota Corolla and the Honda Civic police cars in Macau, China.

When first introduced, United States-market Mazda3 models were available in only two trim levels, i and s, with the 2.0 L and 2.3 L engines, respectively. Since then Mazda has introduced additional models under the Touring and Grand Touring labels. British Mazda3s are offered in S, TS, TS2, Sport, and a top end 2.3 L turbocharged Mazda3 MPS (Mazda Performance Series) models. Since April 2008, when there was a mainly cosmetic facelift of the Mazda3, there have been some changes to the trim designations for UK cars, with the models became the entry-level S, then Takara (which replaced TS and TS2), the Tamura Special Edition and the Sport and MPS as before.

All three models use the inline-4 Mazda MZR engine, with various types, displacements and outputs including the MZ-CD turbo-diesel, depending on model and market. Transmissions are a five-speed manual transmission and a four-speed automatic transmission; since the 2006 model year, a five-speed automatic is optional on models with the 2.3 L engine. This transmission became standard on the 2.0 L engine in Japan (FWD models only), as part of a minor facelift in early 2008 which includes different front/rear bumper designs, new wheel designs and body colours, stiffened chassis, and better interior materials. The MPS / Mazdaspeed version is only available with a six-speed manual.

==== Philippines ====
In the Philippines, the BK3 replaced the (BH) 323 in 2004. There are three trim levels, "1.6S", "1.6V and " 2.0R". The "1.6V" is powered by Mazda's 1.6L inline-four engine mated to a 4-speed automatic transmission respectively. It came with four speakers and 6 CD audio system, central locking among other features. The top spec "2.0R" is powered by Mazda's 2.0L MZR engine mated to a 4 speed automatic transmission with activematic. It came with side skirts, sunroof, remote keyless entry, immobilizer and leather interior.

In 2007, the entry level "1.6S" received a minor update. Updates includes new gauge clusters, cloth seats and door linings, MP3 ready sound system, and a redesigned grille.

==== Australia ====
In Australia, the BK 3 replaced the 323 (BJ) in January 2004. The original iteration came in several guises, "Neo", "Maxx", "Maxx Sport" and "SP23". The base "Neo" guise came with remote central locking, a four speaker sound system with a CD player among other features. Building upon the Neo, the "Maxx" offered power windows and mirrors, alloy wheels, remote keyless central locking, six speakers and an in-dash sound system. The "Maxx Sport" added primarily cosmetic features, with that including a body kit, front fog lamps and larger alloy wheels. The "SP23" gained a larger engine as well as other smaller luxury features.

In July 2006, Mazda introduced its Series II 3. Updates included refreshed front and rear light fixtures, as well updated alloy wheels and a new fog light configuration. A high performance "MPS" hatch was introduced into the lineup within this update.

The 3 continuously sold well throughout the BK generation, reaching 4th in Australian sales within 2006.

=== Engines ===
The Mazda3 features the following engines:

Japanese market (Mazda Axela; JIS ratings):

- 1.5 L: 118 PS (87 kW), 140 N⋅m (103 lb⋅ft)
- 2.0 L: 150 PS (110 kW), 183 N⋅m (135 lb⋅ft)
- 2.3 L: 171 PS (126 kW), 214 N⋅m (158 lb⋅ft)
- 2.3 L MZR DISI Turbo: 264 PS (194 kW), 380 N⋅m (281 lb⋅ft)

European market (ECE ratings):

- 1.4 L: 84 PS (62 kW), 122 N⋅m (90 lb⋅ft)
- 1.6 L: 105 PS (77 kW), 145 N⋅m (107 lb⋅ft)
- 2.0 L: 150 PS (110 kW), 187 N⋅m (138 lb⋅ft)
- 2.3 L MZR DISI Turbo: 260 PS (191 kW), 380 N⋅m (280 lb⋅ft)
- 1.6 L MZ-CD common-rail diesel: 109 PS (80 kW), 240 N⋅m (177 lb⋅ft)
- 2.0 L MZR-CD common-rail diesel: 143 PS (105 kW), 360 N⋅m (266 lb⋅ft)
- 2.2 L MZR-CD common-rail diesel: 185 PS (136 kW), 400 N⋅m (295 lb⋅ft)

American and Canadian markets (SAE net ratings):

- 2.0 L: 148 hp (110 kW), 135 lb⋅ft (183 N⋅m) (04–05) PZEV engine: 145 hp (108 kW) (04–06), 144 hp (107 kW) (07–); 132 lb⋅ft (179 N⋅m) (all years)
- 2.3 L: 160 hp (119 kW), 150 lb⋅ft (203 N⋅m) PZEV engine: 153 hp (114 kW), 149 lb⋅ft (202 N⋅m) (2006 only)
- 2.3 L MZR DISI Turbo: Mazdaspeed3: 263 hp (196 kW), 280 lb⋅ft (380 N⋅m)

Mazda changed the rating for US and Canadian markets 2007 2.3 L naturally aspirated engine:

- 2.3 L: 160 hp (119 kW), 150 lb⋅ft (203 N⋅m) PZEV engine: 151 hp (113 kW), 149 lb⋅ft (202 N⋅m) (07–)

Asian markets (DIN ratings):

- 1.6 L: 110 bhp (82 kW), 107 lbf·ft (145 N·m)
- 2.0 L: 148 bhp (110 kW) and 138 lbf·ft (187 N·m)

Australian market (ADR net ratings):

- 2.0 L: 145 bhp (108 kW), 134 lbf·ft (182 N·m)
- 2.3 L: 154 bhp (115 kW), 150 lbf·ft (203 N·m)
- 2.3 L: DISI MZR: 260 bhp (190 kW), 280 lbf·ft (380 N·m)
- 2.0 L MZR-CD common-rail diesel: 143 PS (105 kW), 360 N⋅m (266 lb⋅ft)

South African market (DIN net ratings):

- 1.6 L: 109 bhp (81 kW), 108 lbf·ft (146 N·m)
- 2.0 L: 140 bhp (100 kW), 134 lbf·ft (182 N·m)
- 2.3 L: 154 bhp (115 kW), 150 lbf·ft (203 N·m)
- 2.3 L: DISI MZR: 260 bhp (190 kW), 280 lbf·ft (380 N·m)

==== Performance ====
Official performance figures for the European Mazda3 1.4 S, the lowest-powered model, are 0–100 km/h (0–62 mph) in 14.3 seconds, with a maximum speed of 170 km/h (110 mph). Wheels magazine reported an 8.7-second 0–100 km/h time for the Australian 2.0 model in its May 2004 issue.

The 1.6 CiTD 80 kW diesel (as sold in Europe) with a five-speed manual does 0–100 km/h (0–62 mph) in 11.6 seconds and has a top speed of 182 km/h (113 mph) according to the official Mazda specifications.

In test results for the 2012 Mazda3 Maxx Sport five-door 2.0-litre engine, it has been reported as having a 0–100 km/h (0–62 mph) acceleration time of 9.2 seconds and a top speed of 190 km/h (120 mph).

In its test results for the 2004 Mazda3 five-door with the 2.3-litre engine, Car and Driver magazine reported a 0–60 mph (0–97 km/h) acceleration time of 7.4 seconds and a governor-limited top speed of 190 km/h (120 mph).

Car and Driver documented the acceleration of a 2007 Mazda3 four-door sedan. Equipped with a 2.3-litre engine and 5-speed manual transmission, the Mazda3 has a 0−60 mph (−97 km/h) time of 7.3 seconds and completes the quarter mile in 15.8 seconds at 88 mph (142 km/h).

The fuel consumption of these models averages in the 10 L/100 km (24 mpg_{‑US}; 28 mpg_{‑imp}), with the 2-litre 2008 Mazda3 automatic-transmission model scoring a 10 L/100 km (24 mpg_{‑US}; 28 mpg_{‑imp})/7.6 L/100 km (31 mpg_{‑US}; 37 mpg_{‑imp}) city/highway United States Environmental Protection Agency (EPA) rating.

=== 2006 ===
For the 2006 model year, Mazda added variable valve timing and variable-length intake runners to the 2.0-litre engine resulting in a power increase to 150 bhp (112 kW; 152 PS). The automatic transmission used in the S trim Mazda3 with the 2.3-litre engine was changed from a four-speed to a five-speed design. The larger engine became PZEV-certified (Partial Zero Emissions Vehicle) for vehicles sold in California and other states that have adopted California automotive emission standards. The smaller engine had already been PZEV-certified. The colour palette was also simplified in 2006, with the deletion of Canary Yellow and Lava Orange Mica.

=== 2007 ===
The 3 received a minor cosmetic facelift for the 2007 model year with minimal exterior, interior and mechanical changes. On base models, the black plastic at the top of the grille became body-coloured. The front fascia and bumper were changed with a floating foglight design and the lower air intake opening was reshaped to better resemble the typical "Mazda five-point face." All Mazda3 sedans and five-doors gained the same "Axela" clear-lens style rear tail-lights as the SP23 model, which in 2007, Mazda brought out the Mazda Axela similar to the Mazda6 Atenza. In addition, the Grand Touring trim also featured LED brake lights. The LED brake lights were added to compete with the growing trend of higher-end vehicles using LED tail lamps for more visible light output. The range of alloy wheels were redesigned, featuring a 17-inch alloy wheel for the Grand Touring version. The rear fascia was slightly changed adding a notch on the bumper cover of the sedan. Several new exterior colours were added, phantom blue, a copper red metallic (April 2008), Aurora Blue and dark cherry. The Titanium Gray colour was replaced with a darker Galaxy Gray colour.

The interior of the Mazda3 was offered with several new colour choices and an audio jack in the centre console, allowing the use of digital music players. Also, Takara models, which were introduced in the 2008 upgrade, added climate control and 6-CD autochanger to the TS specification.

The 2007 model also includes less visible mechanical changes. The keyless entry system was improved. Reinforcements to the body shell improve overall chassis rigidity. The front dampers of the MacPherson strut suspension have been re-tuned to quicken steering response and reduce understeer. The hydraulic dampers of the multi-link rear suspension were also re-tuned to match the front suspension changes. Mazda engineers and designers addressed concerns regarding cabin noise level by redesigning or changing multiple systems and adding sound-deadening material to the roof lining and hood panel.

The bumper-to-bumper warranty was reduced to 36 months / 36,000 miles while the powertrain warranty was increased to 60 months / 60,000 miles in most markets. In the UK, all Mazda3s have a 3-year unlimited mileage warranty, 3-year roadside assistance and 12 year anti perforation warranty as standard.

Canadian-spec Mazda3s received standard seat-mounted side-airbags and body-shell-mounted side-curtain airbags across the model range. Previously, both airbag types were not available.

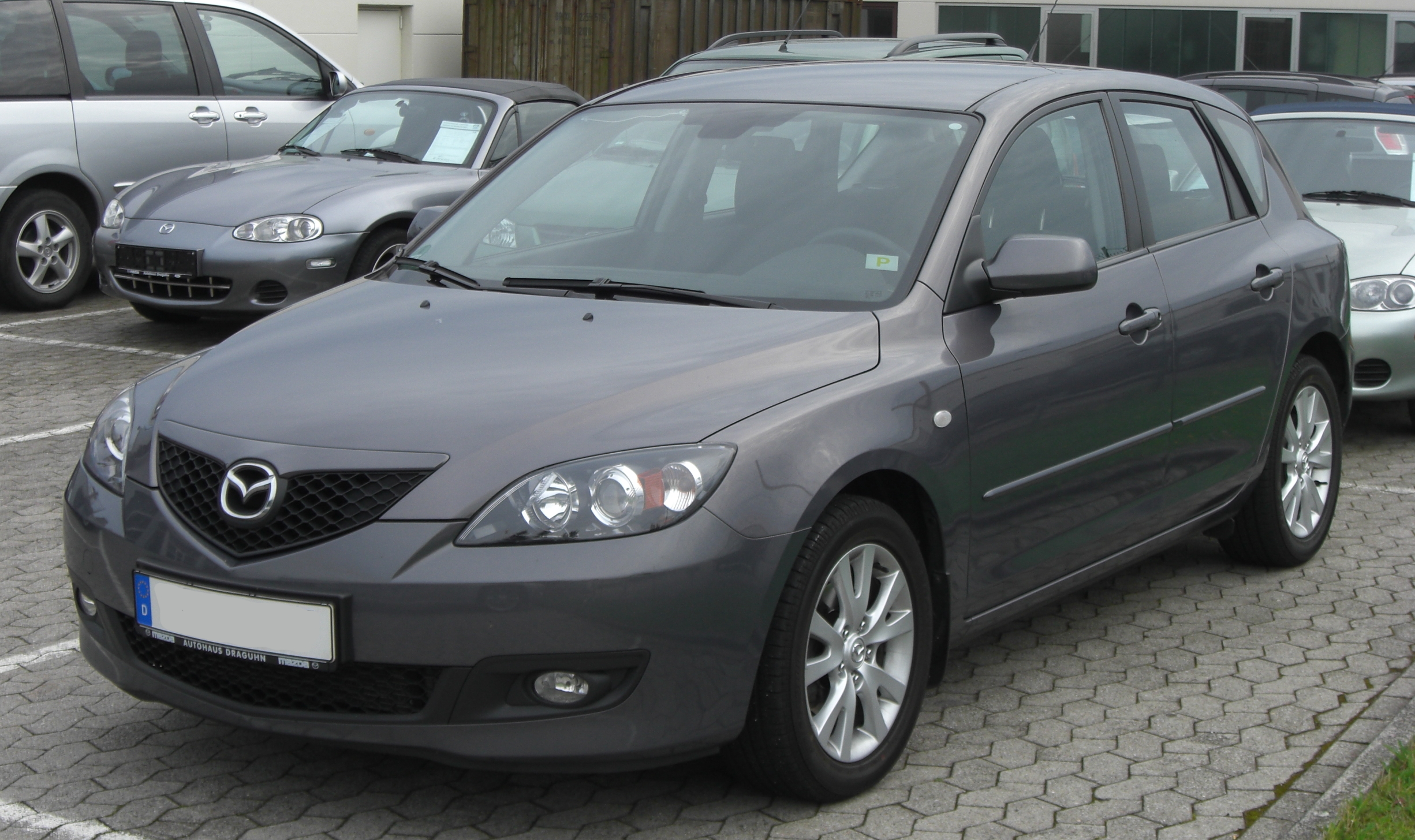
Hatchback (facelift)

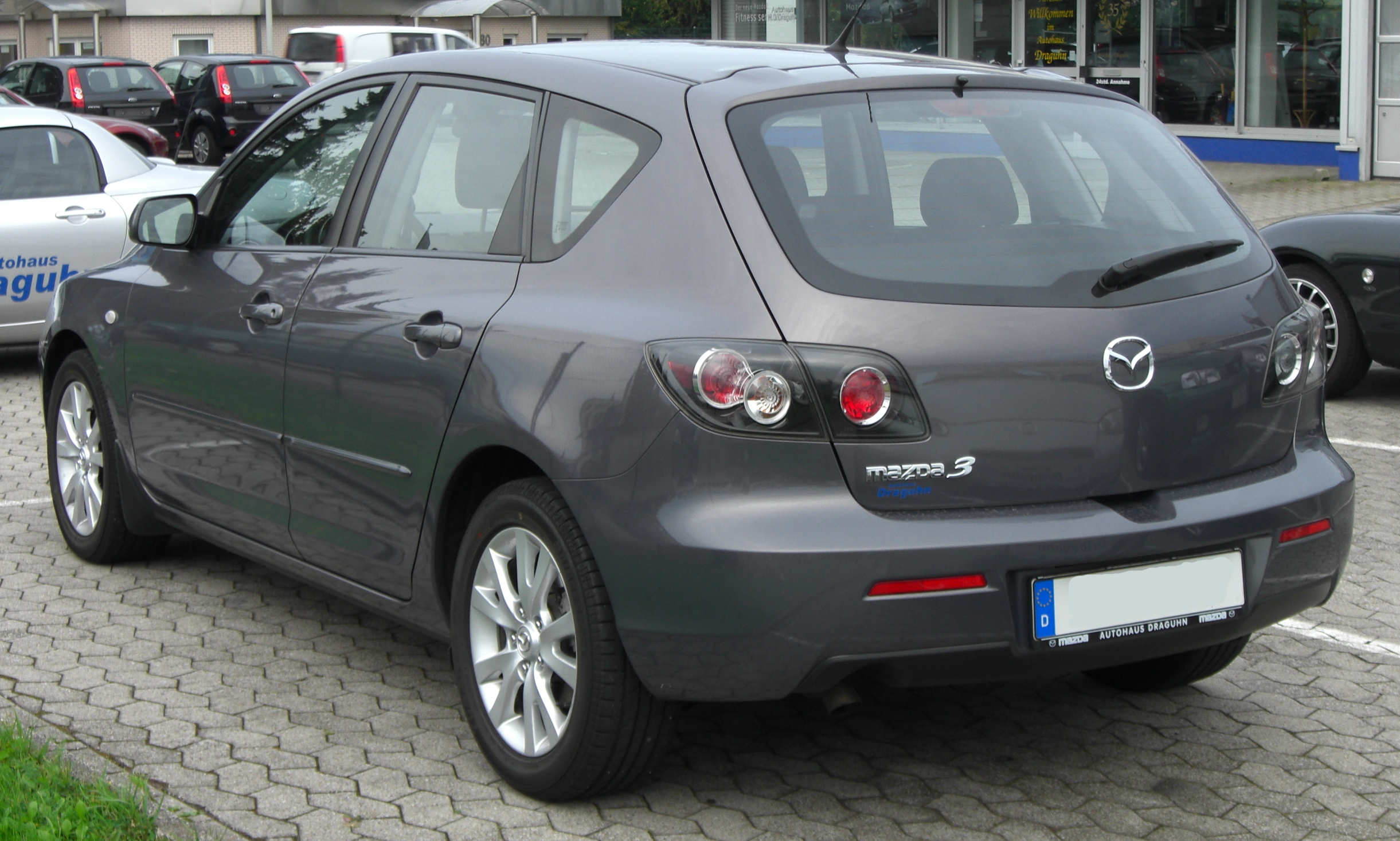
Hatchback (facelift)

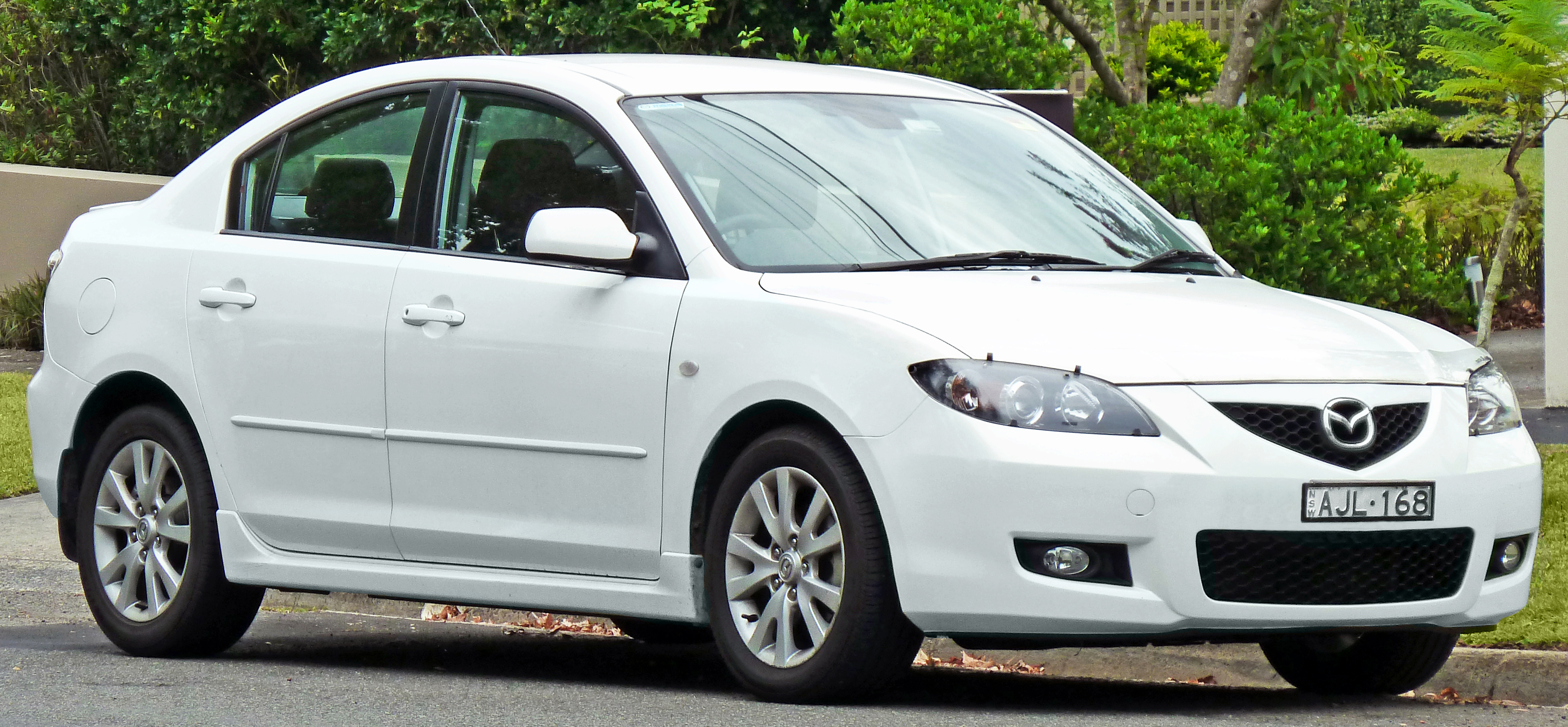
Sedan (facelift)

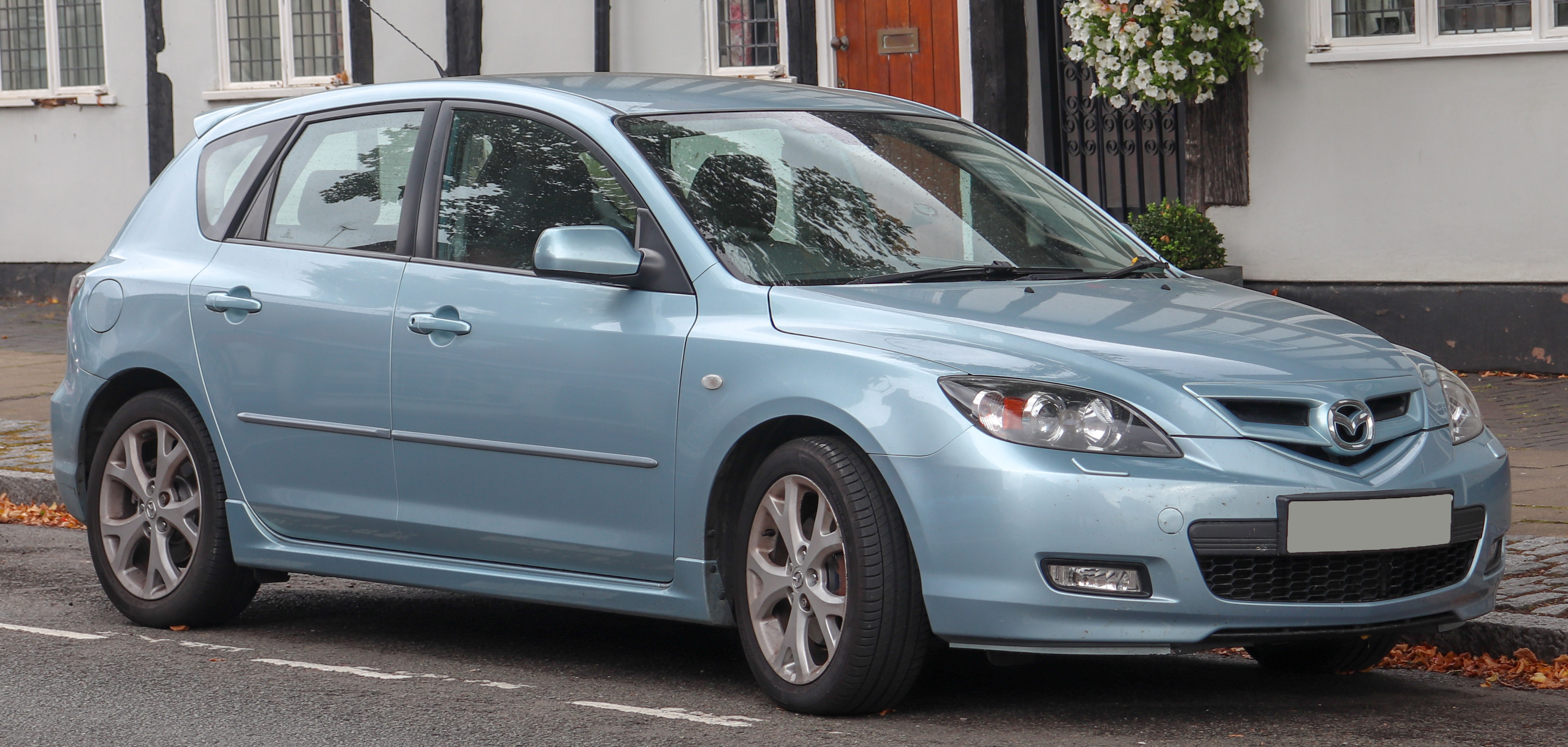
Mazda3 Sport (facelift)

=== 2008 ===
An additional trim level included the Sport GX with a 2.0 L engine, previously all Sport hatchbacks had a 2.3 L engine and came only in GS or GT trims. Compared to the GX sedan, the GX hatchback has body-coloured door handles, and fog lamps. Options for the Sport GX include air conditioning, a convenience package containing power accessories and 15-inch alloys, and a rear trunk spoiler.

The GS sedan received standard 16-inch alloy wheels, previously only available with the moonroof option, while the GX had 15-inch alloy wheels added to the convenience package (which includes steering-wheel mounted audio controls, power windows, power locks, and remote entry). The GS hatchback became equipped with factory-installed air conditioning. GT models received standard xenon headlights, previously part of the leather package.

In the U.S., the i Touring trim level was replaced by the i Touring Value model. This new model added a body-colour front grille, fog lights and 17-inch alloy wheels, giving it a very similar appearance to the more expensive s models. The interior also received leather-covered steering wheel and shift knob from the "s" model. Anti-lock brakes and side-impact airbags, previously optional, became standard.

=== 2009 ===
Initial news reports indicated the 2009 model year would receive a minor facelift by the end of the year with exterior design modifications that included chrome door handles, a new roof spoiler, expanded use of black moldings on the rear bumper, and new alloy-wheel options. This turned out to not occur in the US or Canadian market. The 2009 model year was only a few months long as production ceased in November 2008.

=== Safety ===
Euro NCAP test results* Mazda3 1.6L GE (LHD) (2006)
Test	Score	Rating
Adult occupant:	33	4 /5 stars
Child occupant:	32	3 /5 stars
Pedestrian:	15	2 /4 stars

==== ANCAP ====
ANCAP test results* Mazda 3 variants with side & curtain airbags (2004)
Test	Score
Overall	4 /5 stars
Frontal offset	12.37/16
Side impact	15.50/16
Pole	2/2
Seat belt reminders	3/3
Whiplash protection	Not Assessed
Pedestrian protection	Marginal
Electronic stability control	Optional

ANCAP test results* Mazda 3 sedans with side and curtain airbags (2004)
Test	Score
Overall	4 /5 stars
Frontal offset	12.39/16
Side impact	14.17/16
Pole	Not Assessed
Seat belt reminders	0/3
Whiplash protection	Not Assessed
Pedestrian protection	Poor
Electronic stability control	Not Assessed

== Second generation (BL; 2008) ==
Second generation
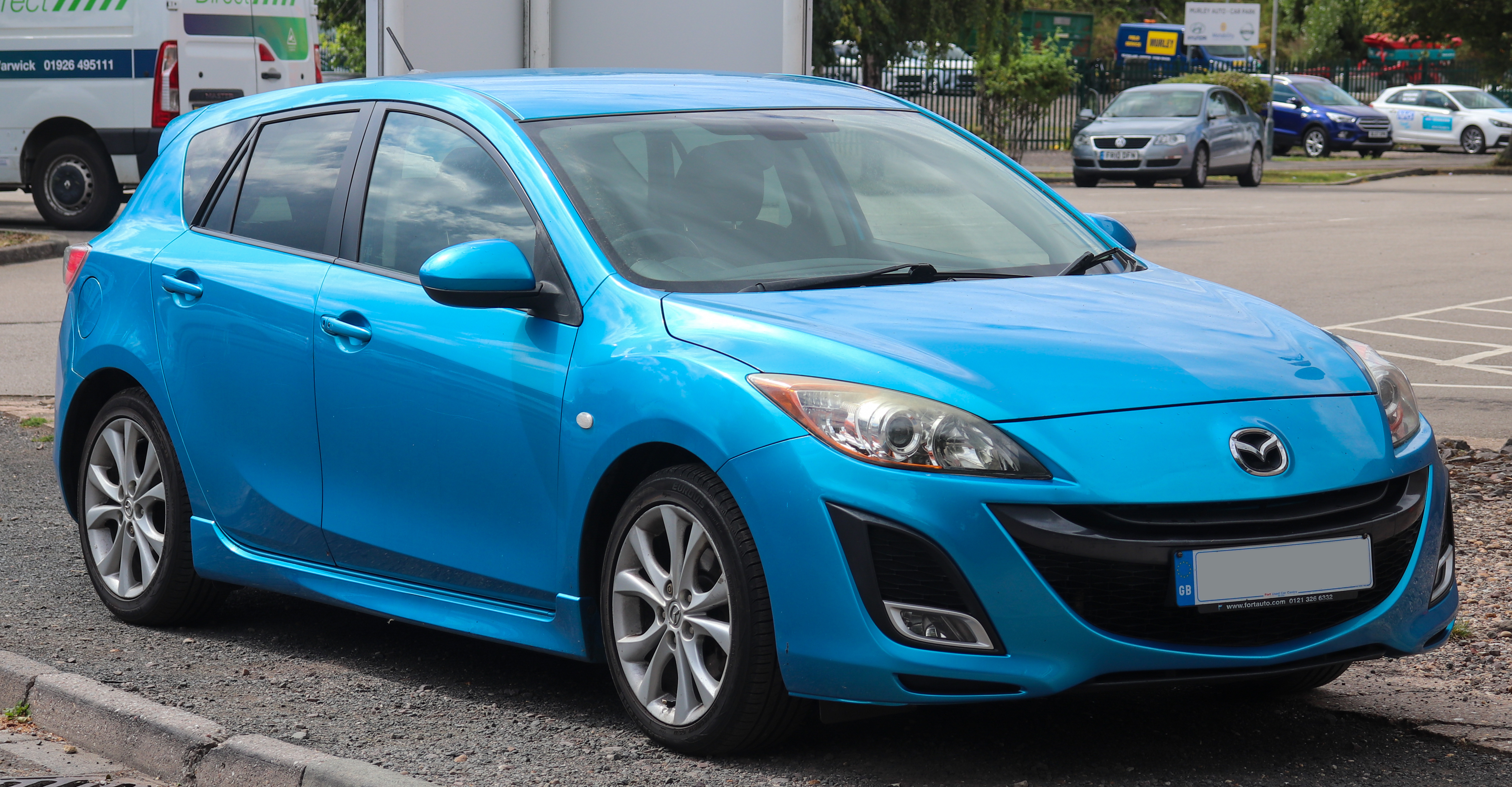
- Hatchback (pre-facelift)

Overview
- Model code: BL
- Production: November 2008 – June 2013
- Model years: 2010–2013
- Assembly: Japan: Hōfu (Hōfu Plant No. 1); China: Nanjing (Changan Ford Mazda) & (Changan Mazda); Colombia: Bogotá; Iran: Tehran (Bahman Group); Malaysia: Kulim; South Africa: Pretoria; Taiwan: Ford Lio Ho Motor; Thailand: Rayong (AutoAlliance Thailand); Vietnam: Quảng Nam (Truong Hai Auto Corporation)
- Designer: Kunihiko Kurisu (2006)

Body and chassis
- Platform: Ford C1 platform
- Related: Mazda Premacy/Mazda5; Ford Focus

Powertrain
- Engine: Gasoline: 1.5 L MZR ZY-VE I4; 1.6 L MZR ZM-DE I4; 2.0 L MZR L I4; 2.0 L Skyactiv-G PE-VPS I4; 2.3 L MZR L DISI turbo I4; 2.5 L MZR L5-VE I4; Diesel: 1.6 L MZ-CD I4; 2.2 L MZR-CD I4
- Transmission: 5-speed G35M-R manual; 6-speed G66M-R manual; 4-speed Ford 4F27E/Mazda FN4A-EL automatic; 5-speed Ford FNR5/Mazda FS5A-EL automatic; 6-speed Aisin AWTF-80 SC automatic; 6-speed Skyactiv-Drive automatic; CVT

Dimensions
- Wheelbase: 2,640 mm (103.9 in)
- Length: 4,595 mm (180.9 in) (sedan); 4,505 mm (177.4 in) (hatchback)
- Width: 1,755 mm (69.1 in)
- Height: 1,470 mm (57.9 in)
- Curb weight: 1,260 kg (2,777.8 lb)

In development from 2004 and designed under Kunihiko Kurisu from early 2005 to August 2006, in November 2008 Mazda debuted the second-generation Mazda3 with restyled exterior. Two engines were offered in the US and Canadian markets, the 2.0-litre petrol engine offered in the previous generation and a new 2.5 L inline-four shared with the second-generation Mazda6.

The C1 architecture, a collaboration of Ford, Mazda, and Volvo, is carried over from the previous generation though marginally wider, longer and lighter than the previous generation. The 2.3L engine was replaced with a 2.5L engine that produces 167 bhp (125 kW; 169 PS) and 167 lb⋅ft (226 N⋅m) of torque in North American specs. In other markets, more engines are offered including a new 2.2 L turbo-diesel engine. A 2010 Mazda3 with a 2.5 L engine and 6-speed manual transmission accelerates from 0–60 mph (0–97 km/h) in 7.4 seconds and completes the quarter mile in 15.7 seconds at 87 mph (140 km/h).

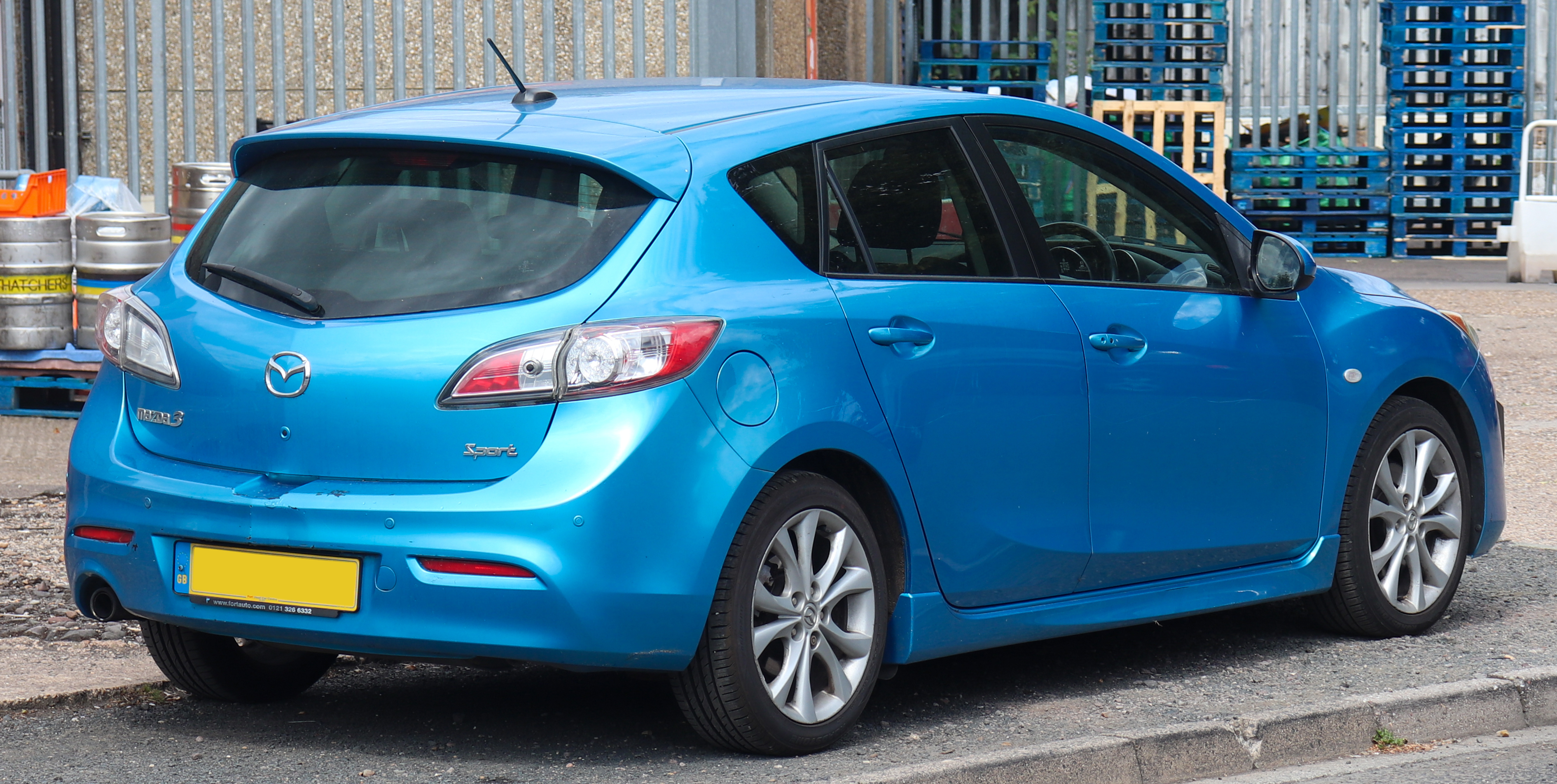
Hatchback (pre-facelift)

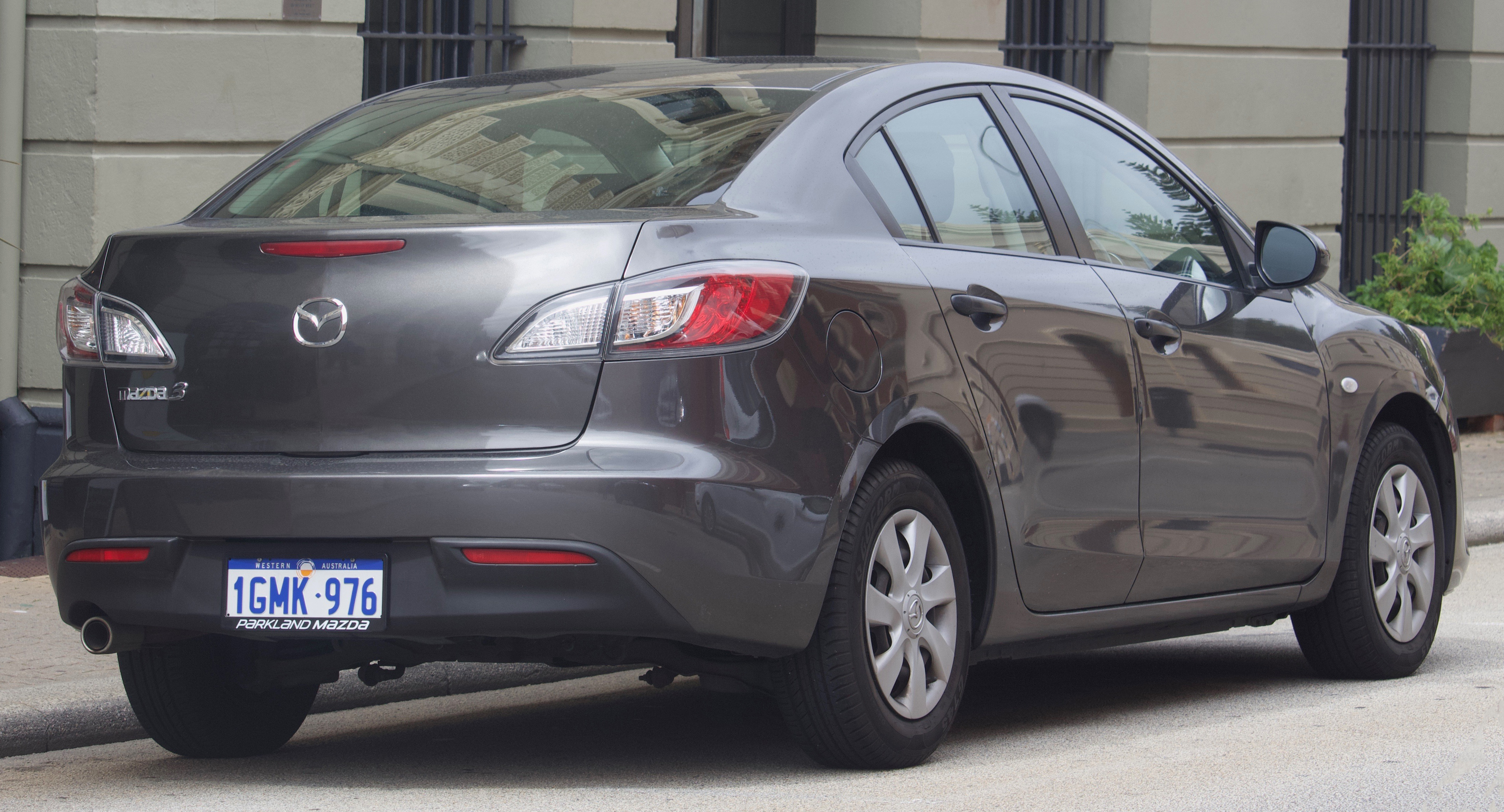
Sedan (pre-facelift)

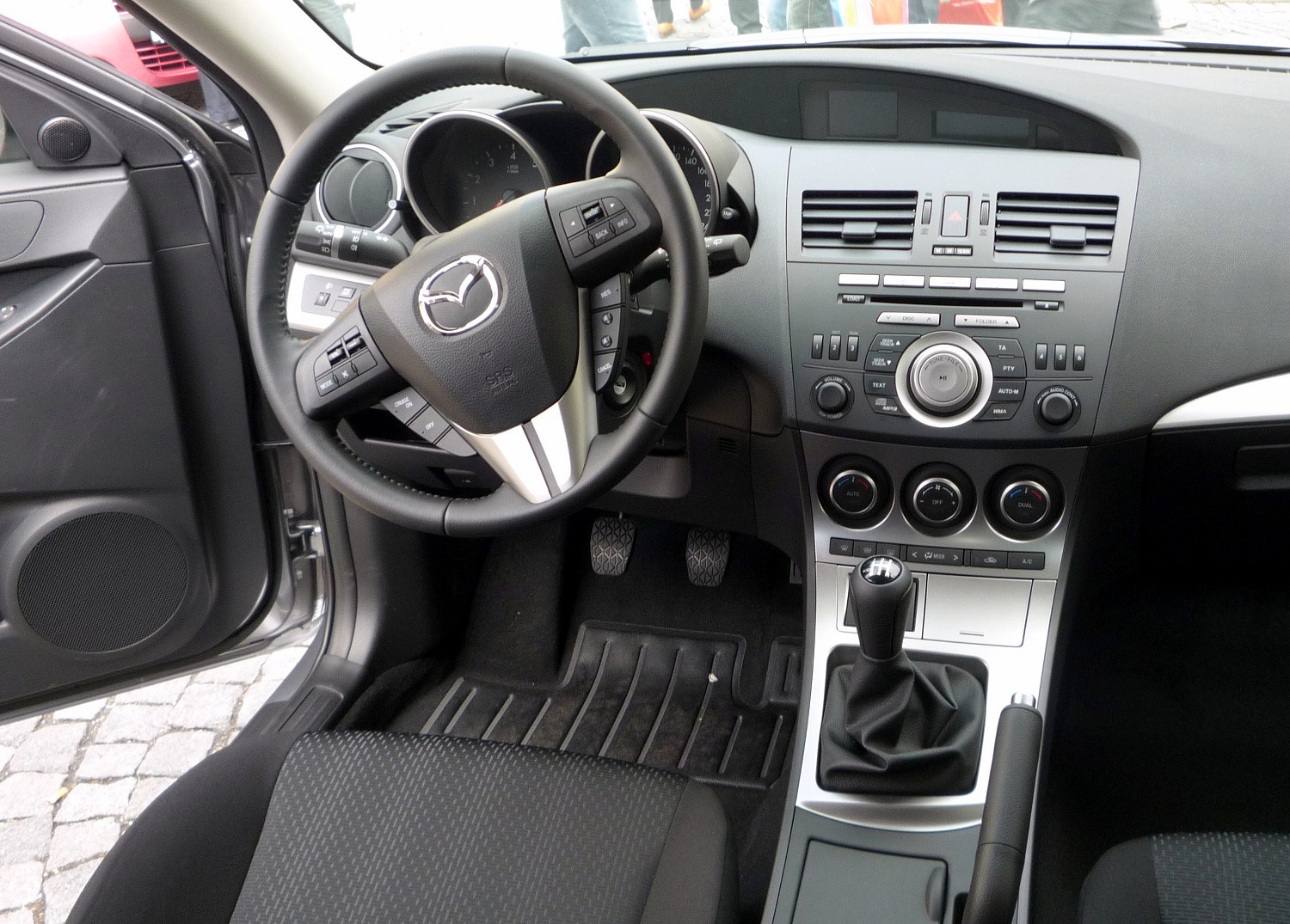
Interior

=== 2010 ===
Mazda unveiled the 2010 Mazda3 sedan/saloon at the Los Angeles Auto Show on 19 November 2008. The second-generation Mazda3 is slightly larger than the older Mazda3 and was available in "i" and "s" versions. The "i" (GX or GS in Canada) is powered by a 148 bhp (110 kW) 2.0 L engine while the "s" (GT in Canada) is powered by a 167 bhp (125 kW) 2.5 L engine adapted from the Mazda6. Both engines are also available in PZEV versions in the US, the 2.0 L producing 144 bhp (107 kW) and the 2.5 L producing 165 bhp (123 kW). The 3s Grand Touring trim level adds leather seats, power driver's seat, rain-sensing windshield wipers, dual-zone automatic climate control, and steerable active bi-xenon headlights as standard equipment. The hatchback was unveiled a few weeks after the sedan/saloon at the Bologna Motor Show.

The European model includes a start-stop system with the 2.0L DISI engine with an estimated increase fuel economy in city cycle by roughly 12%.

Midway through 2010, features including side mirrors with integrated turn signals, footwell lighting, and power seat memory functions were removed.

=== Mazdaspeed3 ===
Full details and images of the high-powered Mazdaspeed3 (known as the Mazda3 MPS in Europe or Mazdaspeed Axela in Japan) were released at the Geneva Motor Show in March 2009. Like the previous generation, the Mazda3 hatchback variant has been selected as the basis for the second generation Mazdaspeed3.

=== 2012 update ===
The 2012 Mazda3 with Skyactiv powertrain was unveiled at the Canadian International Auto Show in Toronto in February 2011. It comes with Mazda's Skyactiv-G 2.0-litre, direct-injection petrol engine, and Skyactiv-Drive 6-speed automatic or Skyactiv-MT 6-speed manual transmission. The chassis rigidity was increased with the use of additional high tensile steel most significantly in the centre floor pan and B-pillar where reinforcement was extended 7 inches. Additionally, Mazda increased the number of spot welds to join suspension crossmembers to improve handling and stability. There are minor exterior updates: revised grille and air intakes, and a reshaped rear valance panel. Skyactiv models receive a blue ring around the projectors in the headlamps, a Sky Blue engine cover, as well as an optional Skyactiv specific paint colour known as Sky Blue. Car and Driver reported that such a Mazda3 can reach estimated EPA fuel-economy ratings of 30 mpg city and 39 to 40 highway.

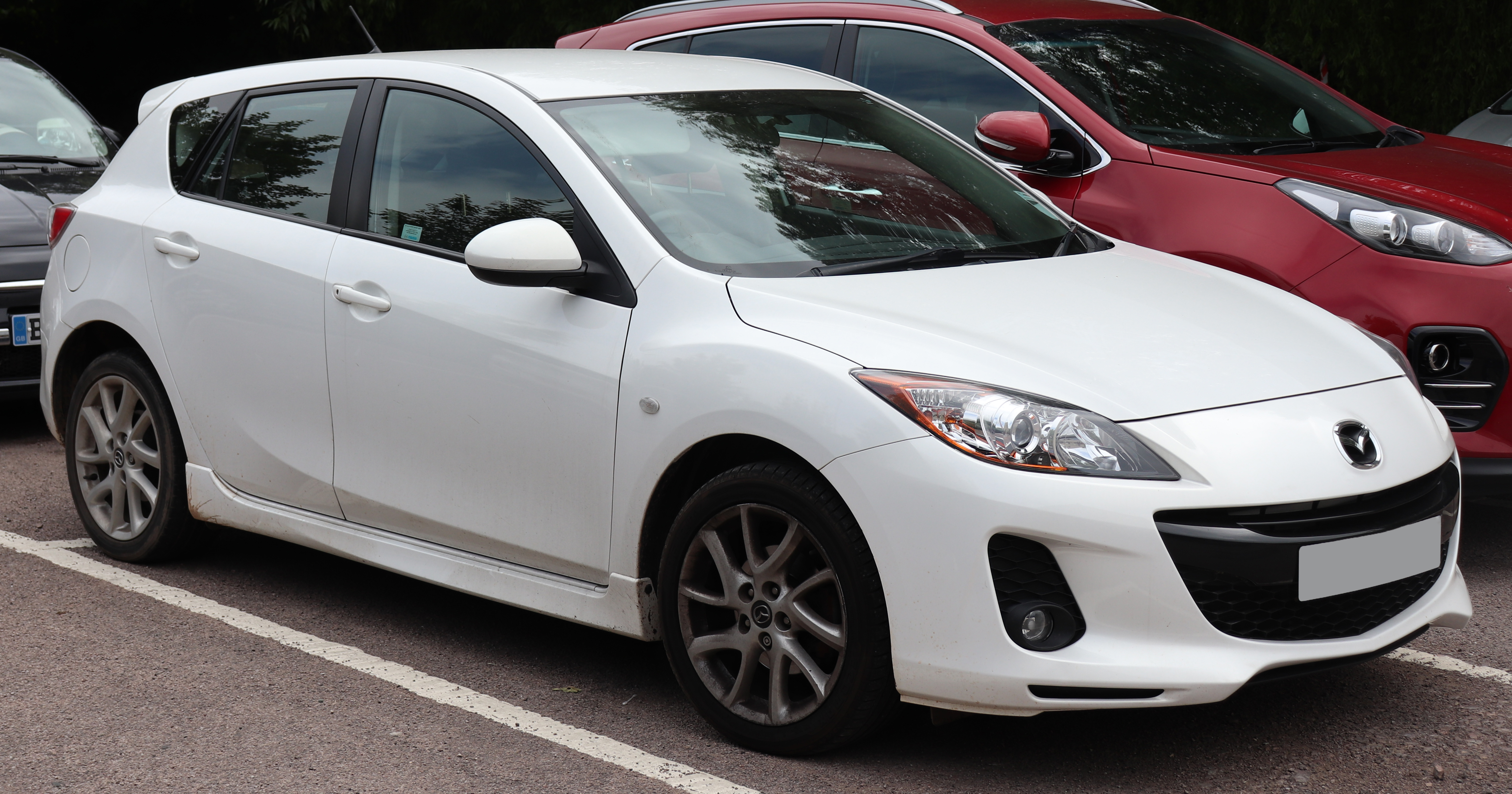
Hatchback (facelift)

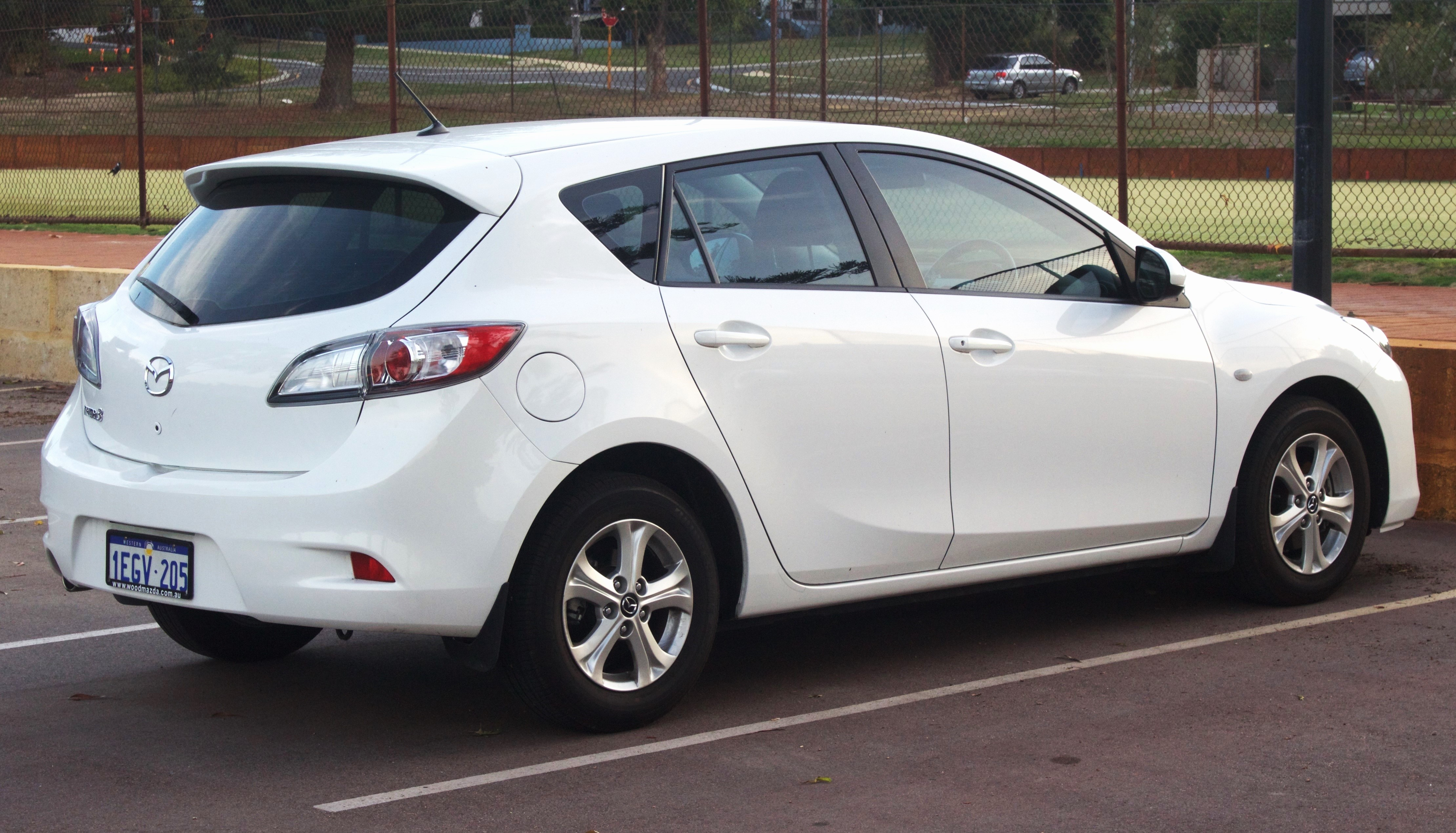
Hatchback (facelift)

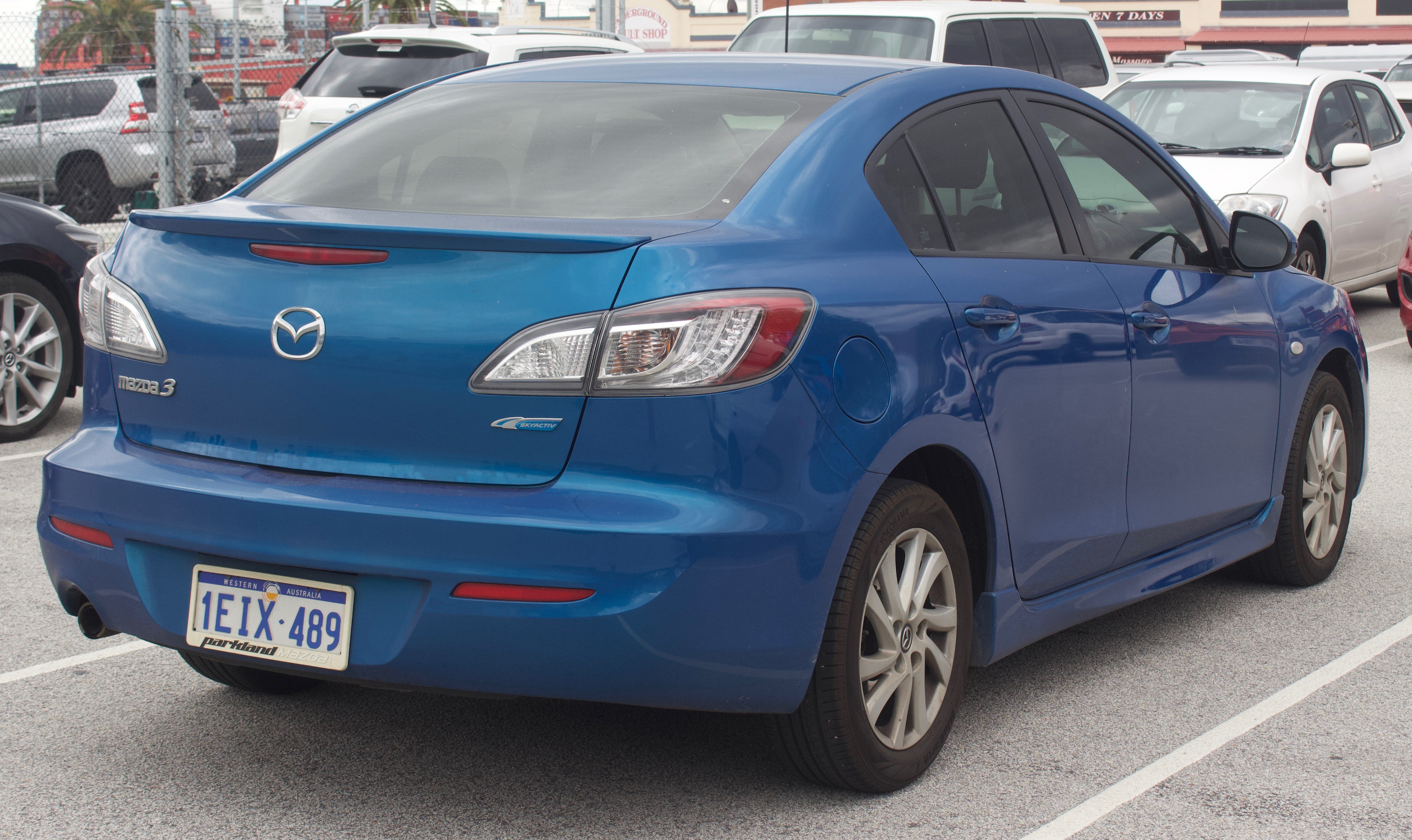
Sedan (facelift)

=== Engines ===
Model	Type	Power, torque@rpm	CO2 emissions (g/km)
Japanese models
ZY-VE	1,498 cc (91.4 cu in) I4	111 PS (82 kW; 109 hp) at 6000, 140 N⋅m (103 lb⋅ft) at 4500	
LF-VDS	1,999 cc (122.0 cu in) I4	150 PS (110 kW; 148 hp) at 6200, 186 N⋅m (137 lb⋅ft) at 4500	
LF-VE	1,999 cc (122.0 cu in) I4	143 PS (105 kW; 141 hp) at 6500, 179 N⋅m (132 lb⋅ft) at 4000	
L3-VDT	2,261 cc (138.0 cu in) I4 turbo	264 PS (194 kW; 260 hp) at 5500, 380 N⋅m (280 lb⋅ft) at 3000	
European models
1.6 DOHC	1,598 cc (97.5 cu in) I4	105 PS (77 kW; 104 hp) at 6000, 145 N⋅m (107 lb⋅ft) at 4000	149
2.0 DOHC w/ AT	1,999 cc (122.0 cu in) I4	150 PS (110 kW; 148 hp) at 6500, 187 N⋅m (138 lb⋅ft) at 4000	175
2.0 DOHC DISI w/i-stop	1,999 cc (122.0 cu in) I4	151 PS (111 kW; 149 hp) at 6200, 191 N⋅m (141 lb⋅ft) at 4500	159
MPS DOHC DISI	2,261 cc (138.0 cu in) I4 turbo	260 PS (191 kW; 256 hp) at 5500, 380 N⋅m (280 lb⋅ft) at 3000	224
1.6 8V SOHC	1,560 cc (95 cu in) I4 diesel	85 kW (116 PS; 114 hp) at 3600, 270 N⋅m (199 lb⋅ft) at 1750–2500	114
2.2 DOHC	2,184 cc (133.3 cu in) I4 diesel	150 PS (110 kW; 148 hp) at 3500, 360 N⋅m (266 lb⋅ft) at 1800	144
2.2 DOHC	2,184 cc (133.3 cu in) I4 diesel	185 PS (136 kW; 182 hp) at 3500, 400 N⋅m (295 lb⋅ft) at 1800	149
US models
4-door i	1,999 cc (122.0 cu in) I4	150 hp (112 kW; 152 PS) at 6500, 183 N⋅m (135 lb⋅ft) at 4500	
Skyactiv-G 2.0	1,999 cc (122.0 cu in) I4	157 hp (117 kW; 159 PS) at 6000, 201 N⋅m (148 lb⋅ft) at 4100	
4-door i PZEV	1,999 cc (122.0 cu in) I4	146 hp (109 kW; 148 PS) at 6500, 179 N⋅m (132 lb⋅ft) at 4500	
4/5-door s	2,488 cc (151.8 cu in) I4	169 hp (126 kW; 171 PS) at 6000, 228 N⋅m (168 lb⋅ft) at 4000	
4-door s PZEV	2,488 cc (151.8 cu in) I4	167 hp (125 kW; 169 PS) at 6000, 226 N⋅m (167 lb⋅ft) at 4000	
MAZDASPEED3	2,261 cc (138.0 cu in) I4 turbo	267 hp (199 kW; 271 PS) at 5500, 380 N⋅m (280 lb⋅ft) at 3000	
Canadian models
4-door GX, GS	1,999 cc (122.0 cu in) I4	150 hp (112 kW; 152 PS) at 6500, 183 N⋅m (135 lb⋅ft) at 4500	
4-door GT	2,488 cc (151.8 cu in) I4	169 hp (126 kW; 171 PS) at 6000, 228 N⋅m (168 lb⋅ft) at 4000	
5-door GX	1,999 cc (122.0 cu in) I4	150 hp (112 kW; 152 PS) at 6500, 183 N⋅m (135 lb⋅ft) at 4500	
5-door GS, GT	2,488 cc (151.8 cu in) I4	169 hp (126 kW; 171 PS) at 6000, 228 N⋅m (168 lb⋅ft) at 4000	
5-door GS-SKY	1,999 cc (122.0 cu in) I4	157 hp (117 kW; 159 PS) at 6000, 201 N⋅m (148 lb⋅ft) at 4100	
MAZDASPEED3	2,261 cc (138.0 cu in) I4 turbo	267 hp (199 kW; 271 PS) at 5500, 380 N⋅m (280 lb⋅ft) at 3000	
Thailand models
1.6 Groove / Groove Sports / Spirit / Spirit Sports	1,598 cc (97.5 cu in) I4	105 PS (77 kW; 104 hp) at 6000, 145 N⋅m (107 lb⋅ft) at 4000	149
2.0 Maxx / Maxx Sports	1,999 cc (122.0 cu in) LF-VD I4	150 PS (110 kW; 148 hp) at 6500, 187 N⋅m (138 lb⋅ft) at 4000	175
Australian models
Neo/Maxx (Sport)	1,999 cc (122.0 cu in) I4	110 kW (148 hp) at 6500, 183 N⋅m (135 lb⋅ft) at 4500	
SP20 (2012)	1,999 cc (122.0 cu in) I4	114 kW (153 hp) at 6000, 194 N⋅m (143 lb⋅ft) at 4100	
Diesel	2,183 cc (133.2 cu in) I4	110 kW (148 hp) at 3500, 360 N⋅m (266 lb⋅ft) at 1800–3000	
SP25	2,488 cc (151.8 cu in) I4	124 kW (166 hp) at 6000, 228 N⋅m (168 lb⋅ft) at 4000	
MPS	2,261 cc (138.0 cu in) I4 turbo	190 kW (255 hp) at 5500, 380 N⋅m (280 lb⋅ft) at 3000	

=== Safety ===
Euro NCAP test results* Mazda3 1.6 'Touring' (LHD) (2009)
Test	Points	%
Overall:	5 /5 stars	
Adult occupant:	30.8	86%
Child occupant:	41	84%
Pedestrian:	18.2	51%
Safety assist:	5	71%

Starting with the 2009 facelift and ever since, the Mazda3 has received a 5/5 star ANCAP rating.

ANCAP test results* Mazda 3 5 door hatches with side and side curtain airbags (2009)
Test	Score
Overall	5 /5 stars
Frontal offset	15.33/16
Side impact	15/16
Pole	1/2
Seat belt reminders	2/3
Whiplash protection	Not Assessed
Pedestrian protection	Marginal
Electronic stability control	Standard

== Third generation (BM/BN/BY; 2013) ==
Third generation
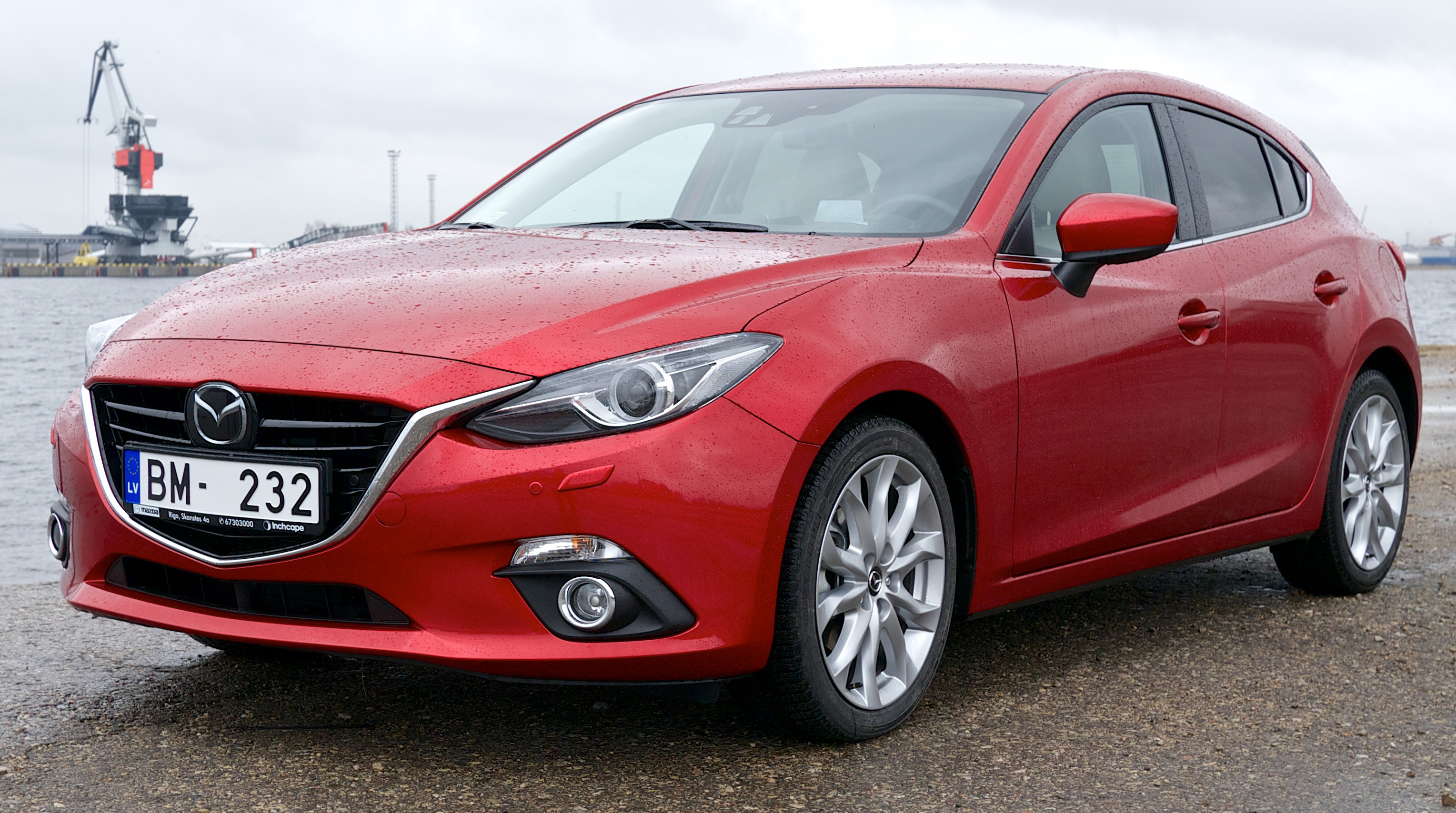
- Hatchback (pre-facelift)

Overview
- Model code: BM / BN / BY
- Production: June 2013 – 2018
- Model years: 2014–2018
- Assembly: Japan: Hōfu (Hōfu Plant No. 1); Mexico: Salamanca, Guanajuato (MMVO); Thailand: Rayong (AutoAlliance Thailand); China: Nanjing (Changan Mazda); Malaysia: Kulim (Inokom); Vietnam: Quảng Nam (Truong Hai Auto Corporation)
- Designer: Koichi Tabata (2011)

Body and chassis
- Related: Mazda CX-5 (KF)

Powertrain
- Engine: Gasoline: 1.5 L Skyactiv-G F-P5 I4; 1.6 L MZR ZM-DE I4; 2.0 L Skyactiv-G PE-VPS I4; 2.0 L Skyactiv-G PE-VPS I4 (hybrid); 2.5 L Skyactiv-G PY-VPS I4; Diesel: 1.5 L Skyactiv-D S5-DPTS/S5-DPTR turbo I4; 2.2 L Skyactiv-D SH-VPTS turbo I4
- Electric motor: AC synchronous motor
- Transmission: 4-speed automatic; 6-speed Skyactiv-MT manual; 6-speed Skyactiv-Drive automatic; E-CVT (hybrid)
- Hybrid drivetrain: Power-split hybrid (Mazda3 Hybrid)
- Battery: 1.3 kWh Nickel-metal hydride

Dimensions
- Wheelbase: 2,700 mm (106.3 in)
- Length: 4,580 mm (180.3 in) (sedan); 4,460 mm (175.6 in) (hatchback)
- Width: 1,795 mm (70.7 in)
- Height: 1,455 mm (57.3 in)
- Curb weight: 1,300–1,315 kg (2,866–2,899 lb)

The third-generation 2014 Mazda3 was revealed in Australia on 26 June 2013. Compared to its predecessor, the third-generation model sits atop the new Skyactiv chassis, no longer sharing the Ford C1 platform. It is the third vehicle to adopt Mazda's 'Kodo' design language, after the CX-5 and the Mazda6. It is the first Mazda3 to not be produced under Ford's ownership of Mazda.

It has a drag coefficient (Cd) of 0.26 for the sedan/saloon, slightly higher for the hatchback. Combined with the Skyactiv technology, this produces a rating from the U.S. EPA of 30 mpg_{‑US} (36 mpg_{‑imp}; 7.8 L/100 km) city and 41 mpg_{‑US} (49 mpg_{‑imp}; 5.7 L/100 km) highway for the 2-litre sedan, and one less mpg highway for the 5-door hatchback.

Two Skyactiv engines are offered in North American markets, the 2.0-litre (with 155 hp (116 kW) and 150 lb⋅ft (200 N⋅m) of torque) and the 2.5-litre (with 184 hp and 185 lb-ft of torque). The 2014 Mazda3 equipped with a 2.5-litre engine and 6-speed automatic transmission accelerates from 0–60 mph (97 km/h) in 6.9 seconds and finishes the quarter mile in 15.2 seconds at 95 mph (153 km/h).

The 2.0-litre engine with the 6-speed manual transmission accelerates from 0–60 mph (0–97 km/h) in 7.8 seconds and finishes the quarter-mile in 16.1 seconds. Initially the 6-speed manual gearbox was only for the 2.0-litre cars, and automatic transmission was standard on the 2.5, or available for the 2.0. In its first-drive review of the 2014 Mazda3, the auto enthusiast weblog Jalopnik stated that "once the 2.5 comes with a manual transmission, there is really no reason to buy anything else in this class."

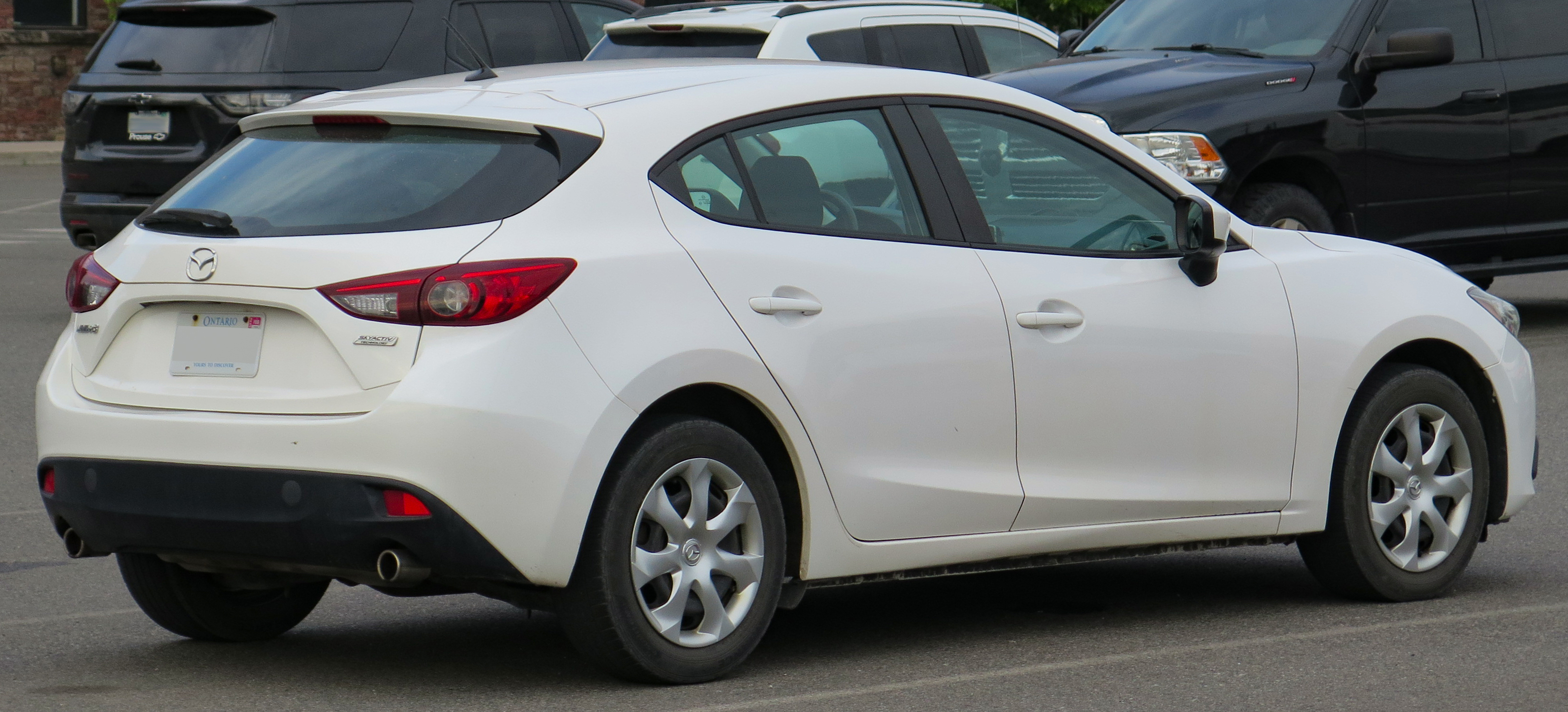
Hatchback (pre-facelift)

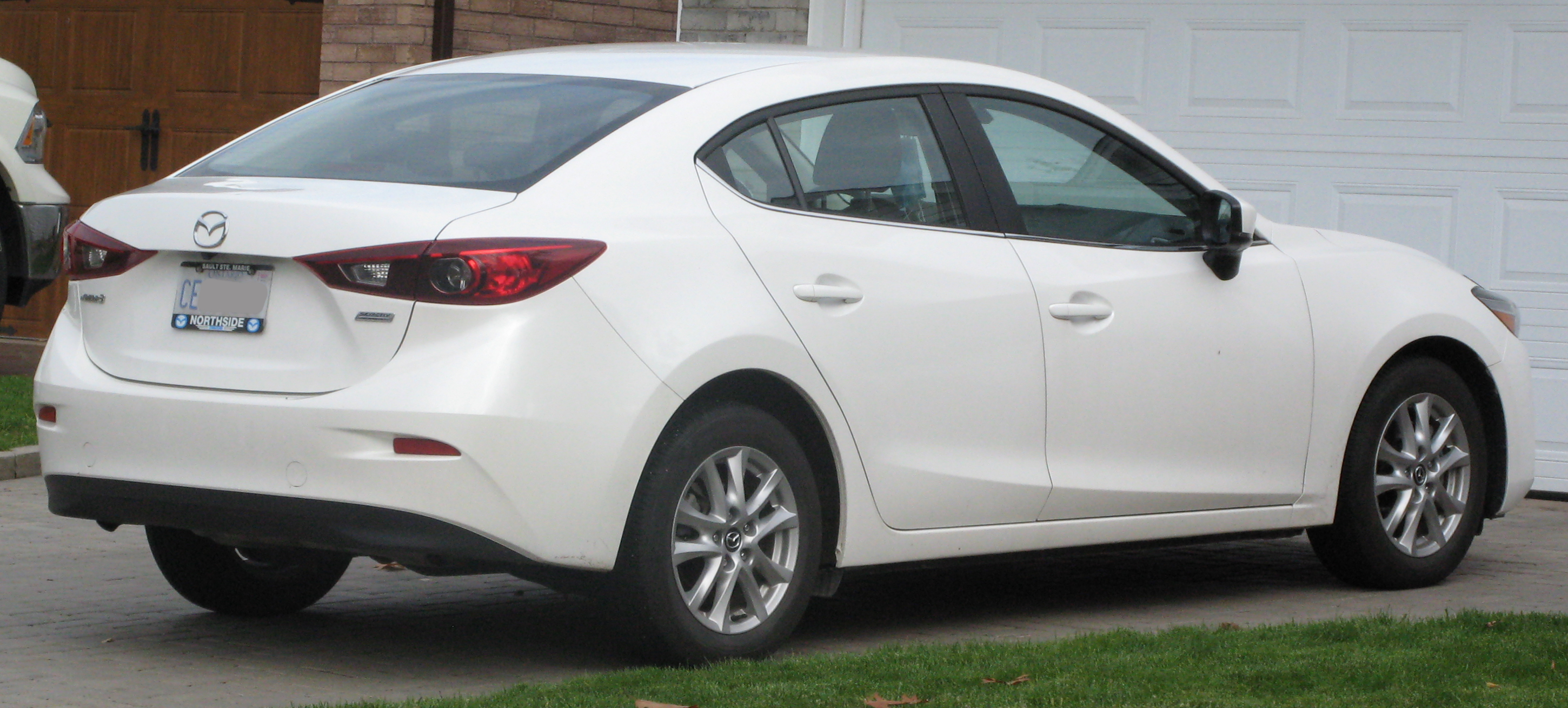
Sedan

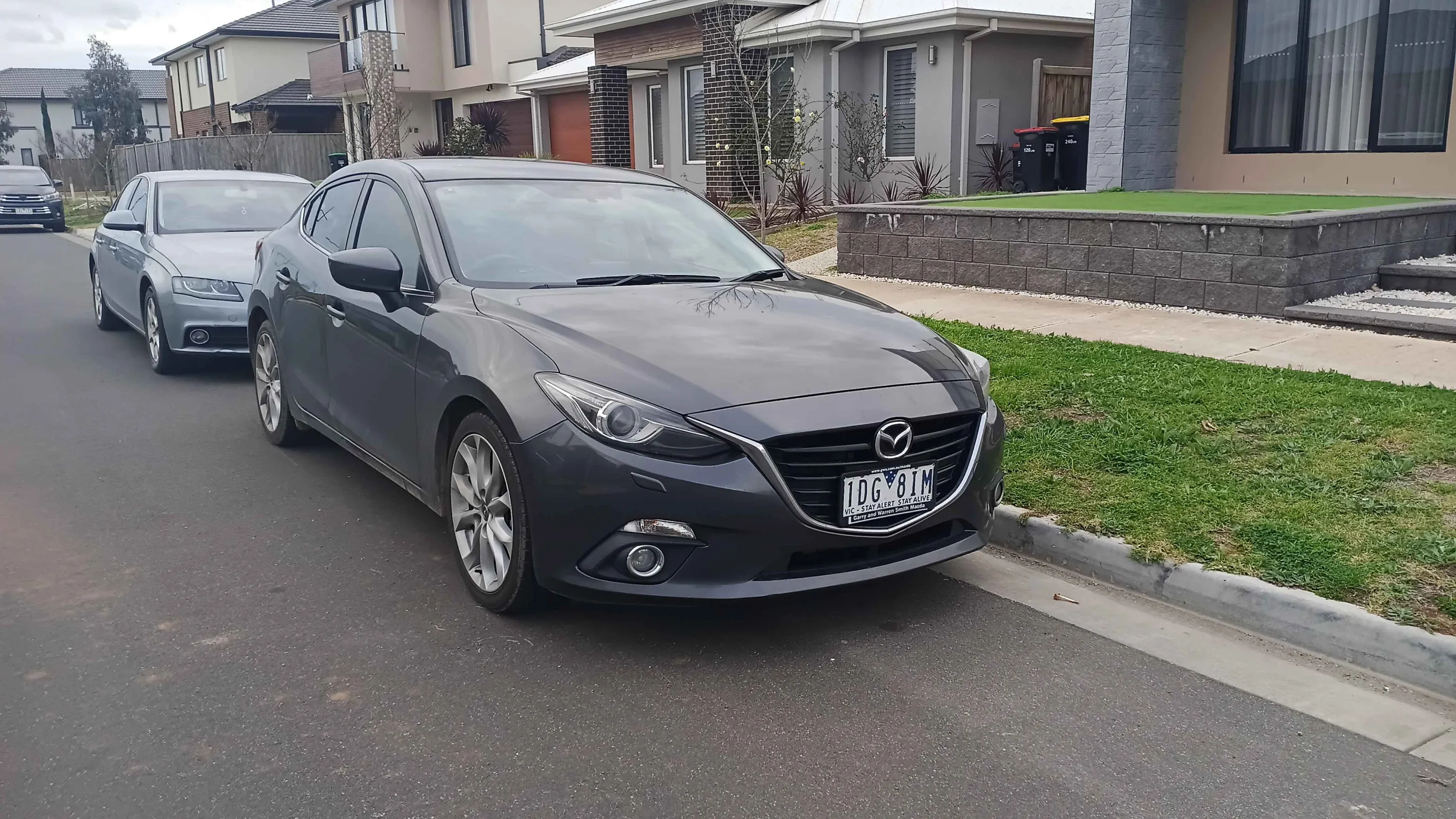
Pre-facelift Sedan Front

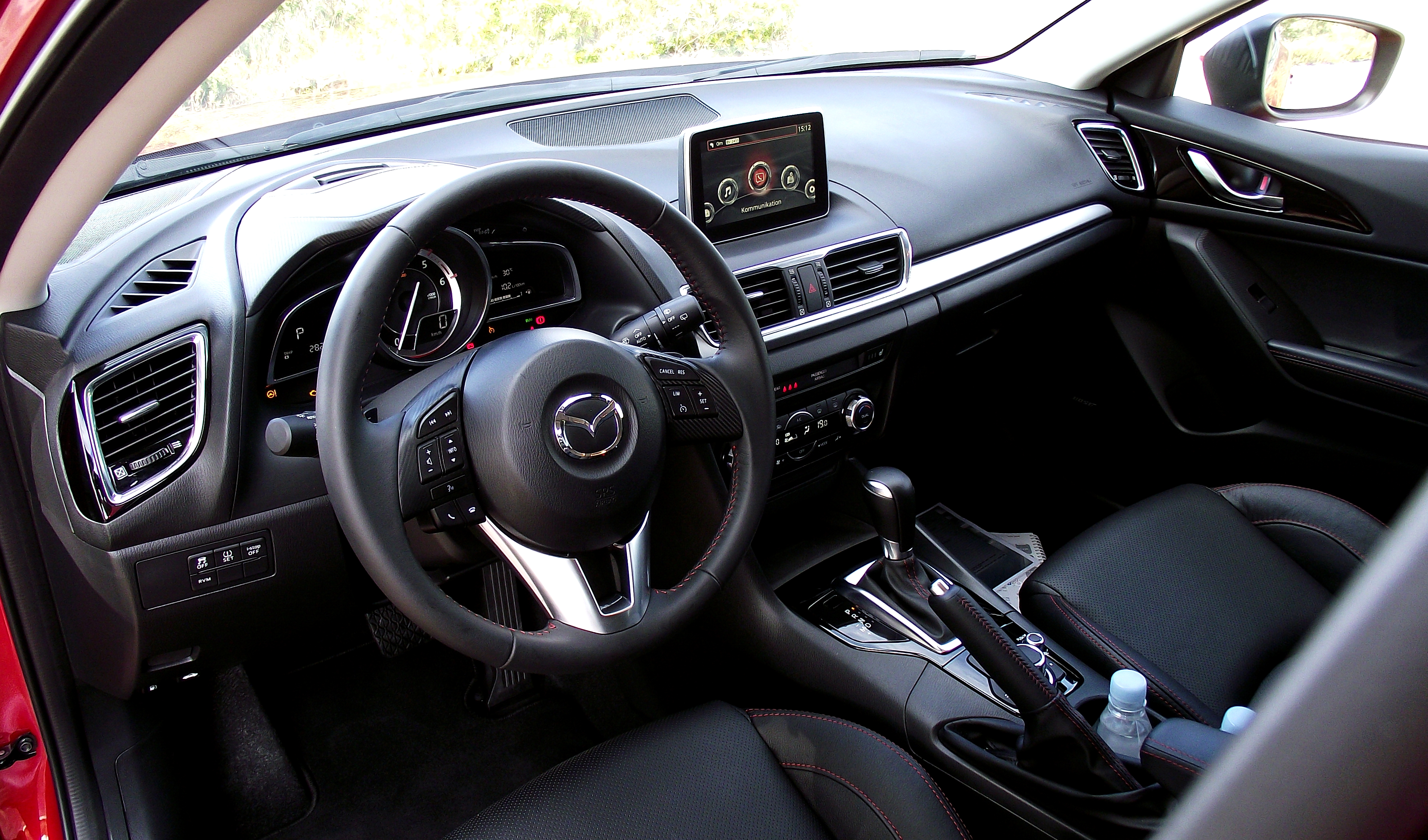
Interior

=== 2015 ===
For the 2015 model year in North America, the 2.5-litre cars are also offered with manual gearbox. Model trim levels for the U.S. market are SV (2.0 Sedan only), Sport (2.0 Sedan and Hatchback), Touring, and Grand Touring (available in all body styles with either engine). The 2014 model ranked number one among Affordable Small Cars in U.S. News & World Report's rankings. In the 2014 Canadian Car of the Year rankings Mazda3 was chosen as the Best New Small Car. Canadian magazine The Car Guide chose Mazda3 as the Best Compact Car in its Best Buys car rankings for 2015 and 2016.

In Europe, three Skyactiv-G (petrol) engines are offered, one 1.5L and two 2.0L (at two different power ratings, 120 and 165 PS (88 and 121 kW)); and a 2.2L Skyactiv-D (Diesel) engine is available. Availability of hatchback and sedan/saloon body styles and their combinations with engines varies amongst European markets. In 2014, the Mazda3 made it to the finals of the European Car of the Year competition. For the UK market, the Mazda3 Sedan was marketed as a fastback.

Thailand models of Mazda3 went on sale on 18 March 2014.

A concept version of the Mazda3, with an engine powered by compressed natural gas, was unveiled in 2013 at the Tokyo Motor Show.

In Malaysia, the third-generation Mazda3 was first launched in March 2014 fully imported from Japan and was available with a sole 2.0L sedan variant. In April 2015, locally assembled versions of the Mazda3 became available for purchase. In April 2017, the facelift version was launched with 3 offerings, the Sedan GL, Sedan High and Hatchback.

=== Mazda3 Skyactiv-Hybrid ===
The Mazda3 Skyactiv-Hybrid is a version of the Mazda3 with Skyactiv-G 2.0 engine with 14:1 compression and electric-petrol drive. The vehicle was unveiled at the 2013 Tokyo Motor Show.

=== Production ===
Taiwan models of the Mazda3 were produced by Ford Lio Ho Motor Co., Ltd.

Production of the US market Mazda3 sedan at Mazda de Mexico Vehicle Operation (MMVO) in Salamanca, Guanajuato began on 7 January 2014, as the factory's first production vehicle model.

As of 22 January 2014, cumulative production of the Mazda3 production reached four million units since June 2003.

Production of Thailand market Mazda3 at AutoAlliance (Thailand) Co., Ltd. (AAT) began on 14 March 2014. Within months of release, the 3 was the 15th best-selling car in Thailand.

=== 2016 facelift ===
The facelifted model of the Mazda3 was introduced in August 2016, bearing the BN model code. Changes include a new dashboard layout, new front and rear exterior styling (the latter, only in the hatchback), new first-of-its-kind G-Vectoring Control and the removal of the diesel engine option. Safety and driver assistance features were also improved, adding a traffic sign-recognition sensor and pedestrian detection with the pre-collision braking system.

This facelift debuted in North America for the 2017 model year. In the United States, the "i" and "s" monikers were dropped, leaving the Sport (2.0), Touring (2.5), and Grand Touring (2.5) trim levels.

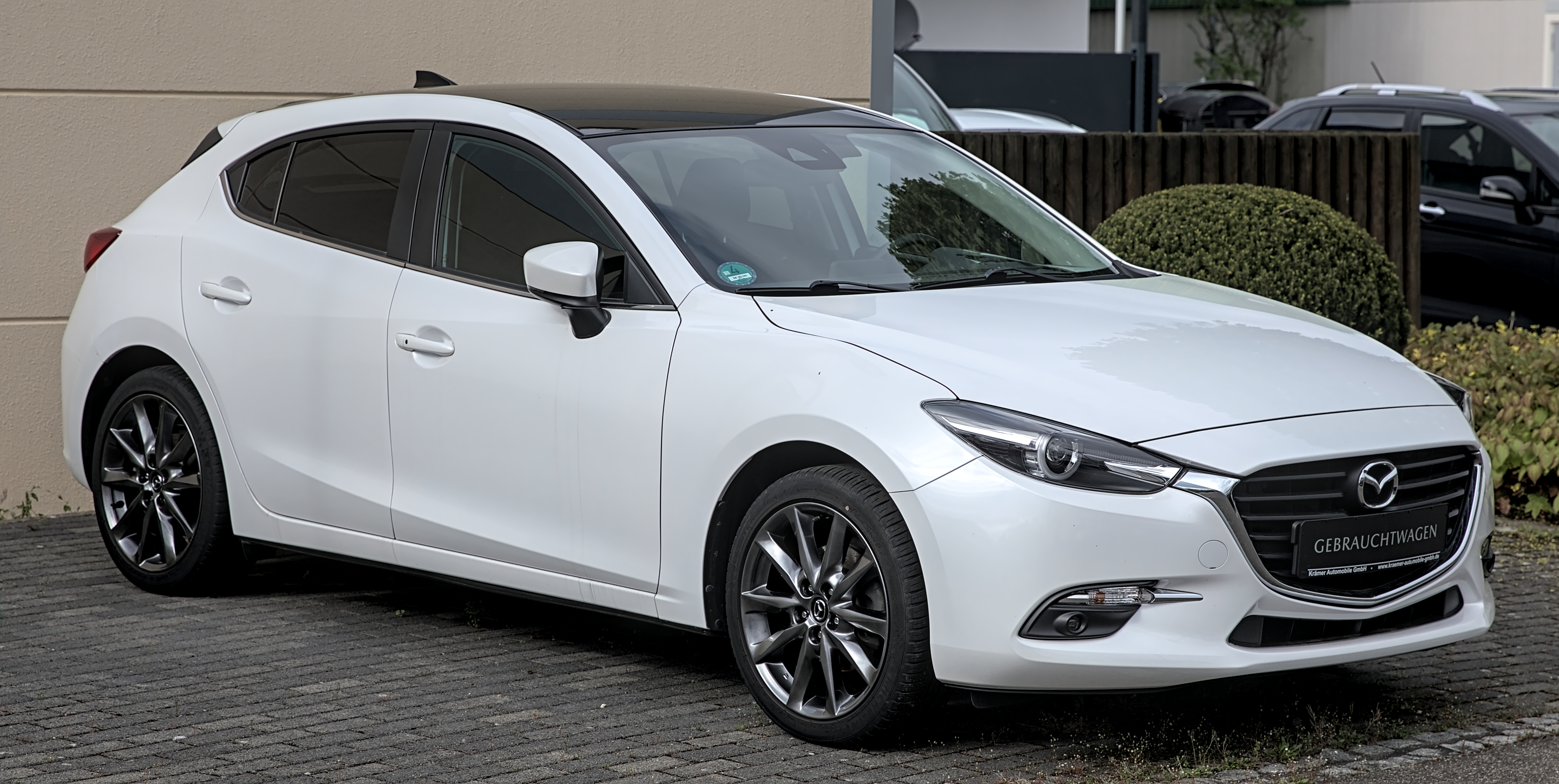
Mazda3 hatchback (facelift)

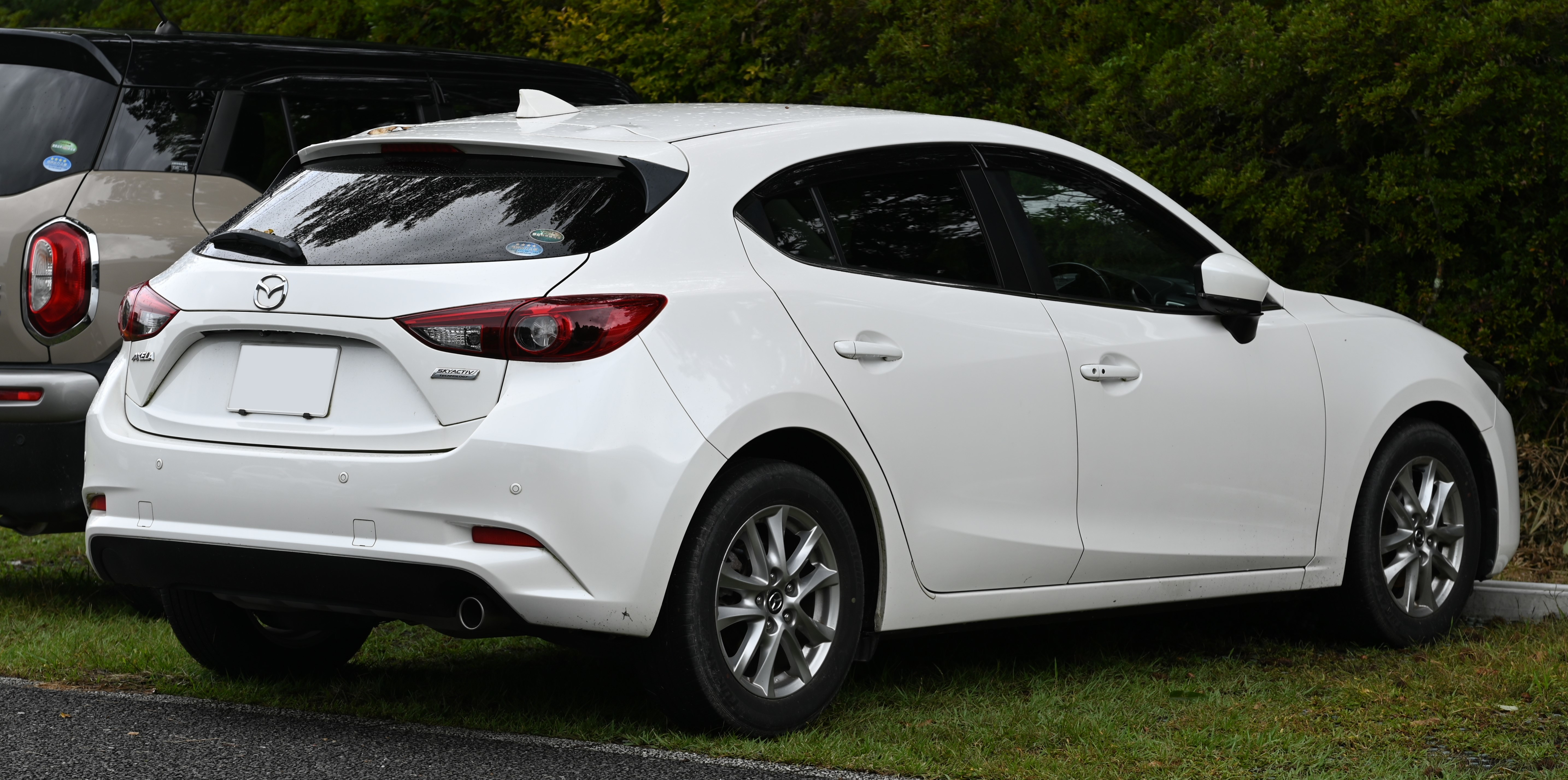
Mazda Axela Sport (facelift)

=== Powertrains ===
Model	Type	Power, torque @rpm	CO2 emissions (g/km)
European models
G100	1,496 cc (91.3 cu in) I4	100 PS (74 kW; 99 hp), 150 N⋅m (111 lb⋅ft) @4000	119
G120	1,998 cc (121.9 cu in) I4	120 PS (88 kW; 118 hp), 210 N⋅m (155 lb⋅ft) @4000	119
G120 AT	1,998 cc (121.9 cu in) I4	120 PS (88 kW; 118 hp), 210 N⋅m (155 lb⋅ft) @4000	129
G165	1,998 cc (121.9 cu in) I4	165 PS (121 kW; 163 hp), 210 N⋅m (155 lb⋅ft) @4000	135
CD150	2,191 cc (133.7 cu in) I4 diesel	150 PS (110 kW; 148 hp), 380 N⋅m (280 lb⋅ft) @1800	107
CD150 AT	2,191 cc (133.7 cu in) I4 diesel	150 PS (110 kW; 148 hp), 380 N⋅m (280 lb⋅ft) @1800	127
Australian models
Neo, Maxx, Touring	1,998 cc (121.9 cu in) I4	114 kW (153 hp), 200 N⋅m (148 lb⋅ft) @4000	N/A
SP25, SP25 GT, Astina	2,488 cc (151.8 cu in) I4	137 kW (184 hp), 251 N⋅m (185 lb⋅ft) @3250	N/A
Astina diesel	2,191 cc (133.7 cu in) I4 diesel	129 kW (173 hp), 420 N⋅m (310 lb⋅ft) @2000	N/A
American models
i SV (2014–2015), i Sport, i Touring, i Grand Touring	1,998 cc (121.9 cu in) I4	155 hp (116 kW) @6000, 150 lb⋅ft (203 N⋅m) @4000	N/A
s Touring, s Grand Touring	2,488 cc (151.8 cu in) I4	184 hp (137 kW) @5700, 185 lb⋅ft (251 N⋅m) @3250	N/A
Canadian models
G, GX, GS, SE, 50th Anniv. Ed. (limited)	1,998 cc (121.9 cu in) I4	155 hp (116 kW) @6000, 150 lb⋅ft (203 N⋅m) @4000	N/A
GT	2,488 cc (151.8 cu in) I4	184 hp (137 kW) @5700, 185 lb⋅ft (251 N⋅m) @3250	N/A
Thai models
Entry (E), Core (C), High (S), High Plus (SP)	1,998 cc (121.9 cu in) I4	163 hp (165 PS; 122 kW) @6000, 155 lb⋅ft (210 N⋅m) @4000	N/A

=== Safety ===
Euro NCAP test results* Mazda3 2.0 Core (LHD) (2013)
Test	Points	%
Overall:	5 /5 stars	
Adult occupant:	33.8	93%
Child occupant:	42.4	86%
Pedestrian:	23.7	65%
Safety assist:	7.3	81%

In 2016 the Mazda3 received a 5/5 ANCAP rating.

ANCAP test results* Mazda 3 all petrol variants (2014)
Test	Score
Overall	5 /5 stars
Frontal offset	15.40/16
Side impact	16/16
Pole	2/2
Seat belt reminders	3/3
Whiplash protection	Good
Pedestrian protection	Adequate
Electronic stability control	Standard

ANCAP test results* Mazda 3 all sedan variants (2016)
Test	Score
Overall	5 /5 stars
Frontal offset	15.40/16
Side impact	16/16
Pole	2/2
Seat belt reminders	3/3
Whiplash protection	Good
Pedestrian protection	Adequate
Electronic stability control	Standard

ANCAP test results* Mazda 3 all hatch variants (2016)
Test	Score
Overall	5 /5 stars
Frontal offset	15.40/16
Side impact	16/16
Pole	2/2
Seat belt reminders	3/3
Whiplash protection	Good
Pedestrian protection	Adequate
Electronic stability control	Standard

== Fourth generation (BP; 2019) ==
Fourth generation
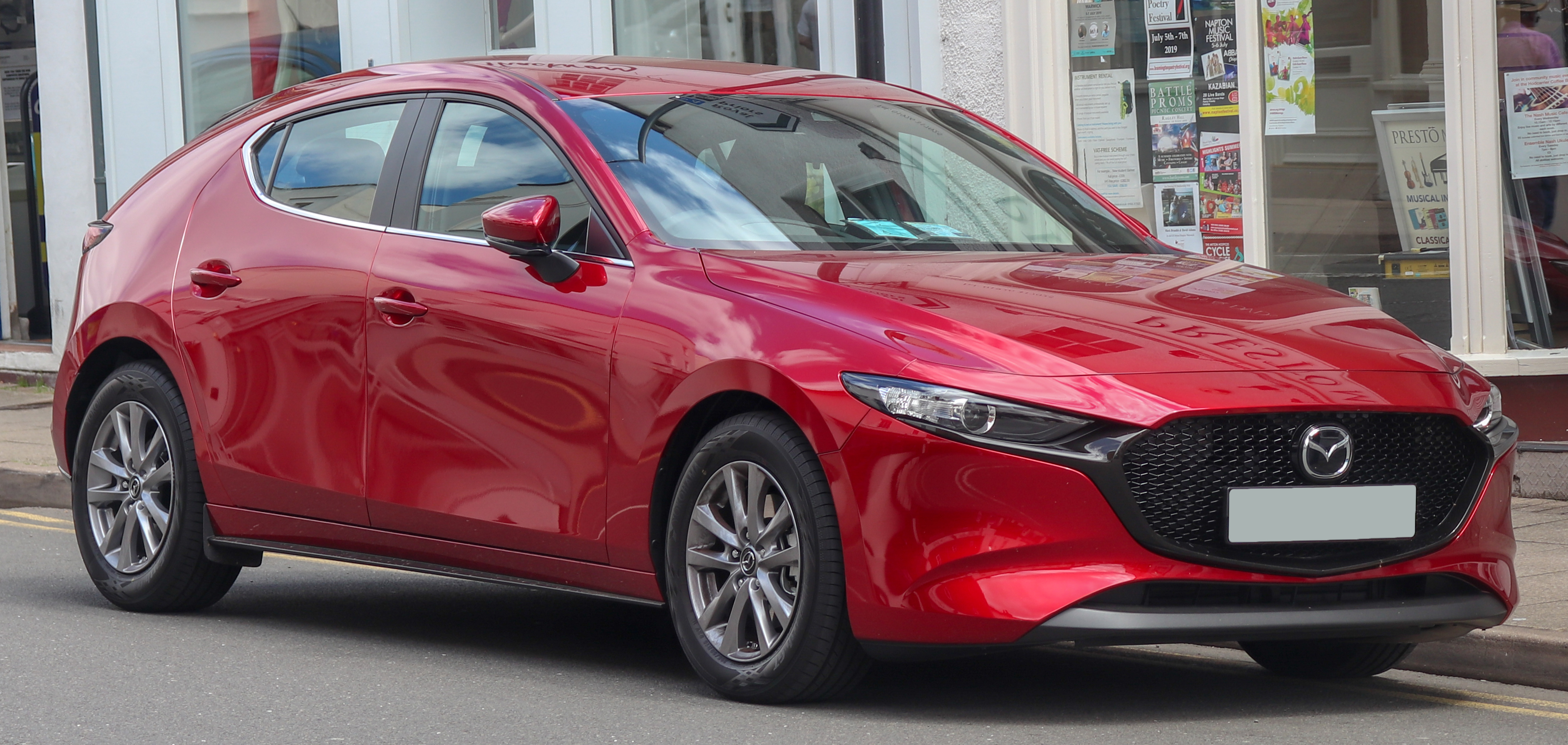
- Hatchback

Overview
- Model code: BP
- Production: 2019–present
- Model years: 2019–present
- Assembly: Japan: Hōfu, Yamaguchi Prefecture (Hōfu Plant); Mexico: Salamanca, Guanajuato (MMVO); Thailand: Rayong (AutoAlliance Thailand); China: Nanjing (Changan Mazda); Vietnam: Chu Lai, Quảng Nam (Truong Hai Auto Corporation)
- Designer: Yasutake Tsuchida (2016)

Body and chassis
- Platform: Small Product Group
- Related: Mazda CX-30; Mazda CX-50; Mazda MX-30

Powertrain
- Engine: Gasoline: 1.5 L Skyactiv-G F-P5 I4; 2.0 L Skyactiv-G PE-VPS I4; 2.0 L Skyactiv-X I4; 2.5 L Skyactiv-G PY-VPS; 2.5 L Skyactiv-G PY-VPTS turbo I4; Gasoline hybrid: 2.0 L e-Skyactiv-G PE-VPS I4 (mild hybrid); 2.5 L e-Skyactiv-G PY-VPS I4 (mild hybrid); 2.0 L e-Skyactiv-X I4 (mild hybrid); Diesel: 1.8 L Skyactiv-D S8-DPTS/S8-DPTR turbo I4
- Electric motor: 6.5 PS Integrated starter motor generator
- Transmission: 6-speed Skyactiv-MT manual; 6-speed Skyactiv-Drive automatic
- Hybrid drivetrain: MHEV (e-Skyactiv G and e-Skyactiv X)
- Battery: 24 V lithium-ion

Dimensions
- Wheelbase: 2,725 mm (107.3 in)
- Length: 4,660 mm (183.5 in) (sedan); 4,460 mm (175.6 in) (hatchback)
- Width: 1,795 mm (70.7 in)
- Height: 1,440–1,445 mm (56.7–56.9 in) (sedan); 1,435–1,440 mm (56.5–56.7 in) (hatchback)

An early design prototype of the fourth-generation Mazda3 hatchback was revealed at the 2017 Los Angeles Auto Show on 17 November 2017. The prototype was sculpted live during the event from clay, based on a design by University of Notre Dame industrial design student Mallory McMorrow. The prototype was the winning entry in the Mazda Design Challenge, in which Mazda teamed up with Facebook to seek design input from college students.

The fourth-generation Mazda3 hatchback and sedan were officially unveiled at the 2018 Los Angeles Auto Show on 28 November 2018, and global sales began in early 2019, as the 2019 model year in North America. The model was previously previewed by the Kai Concept for Hatchback first shown in October 2017, while the Sedan's body language previewed by the Vision Coupe. With the release of the fourth generation model, the "Axela" nameplate was no longer used in the Japanese domestic market as part of Mazda's standardized global naming structure.

Designed from 2015 to late 2016 under the lead of Yasutake Tsuchida, the model is slightly lower and longer than before, with its wheelbase stretched by 25 mm (1.0 in). The exterior design of the sedan and hatchback models are heavily differentiated, with both models only sharing the hood and headlights, while front wing fenders and front doors are designed uniquely for each body styles. Its body uses an increased amount of ultra-high-strength steel 980 MPa or higher to 30 percent of the vehicle body, an increase over the 3 percent in the prior generation.

Mazda has swapped the more sophisticated multilink independent rear suspension from its predecessor for a cheaper and more compact torsion beam setup which is claimed to improve the car's quietness, along with the added sound deadening materials. To enhance the vehicle's NVH, Mazda included a 'two-wall' structure that leaves space between the body and carpeting on the floor. The model is also equipped with an updated version of the torque vectoring system marketed as the G-Vectoring Control Plus.

Interior materials are upgraded with a stitched dash pad, metal trim for the climate control knobs and central infotainment controller, a new steering wheel design, and a newly developed 8.8-inch display screen with a redesigned Mazda Connect system interface. A dark red leather upholstery colour is offered for the hatchback model.

Production of the model in Thailand at the AutoAlliance Thailand in Rayong started on 28 August 2019.

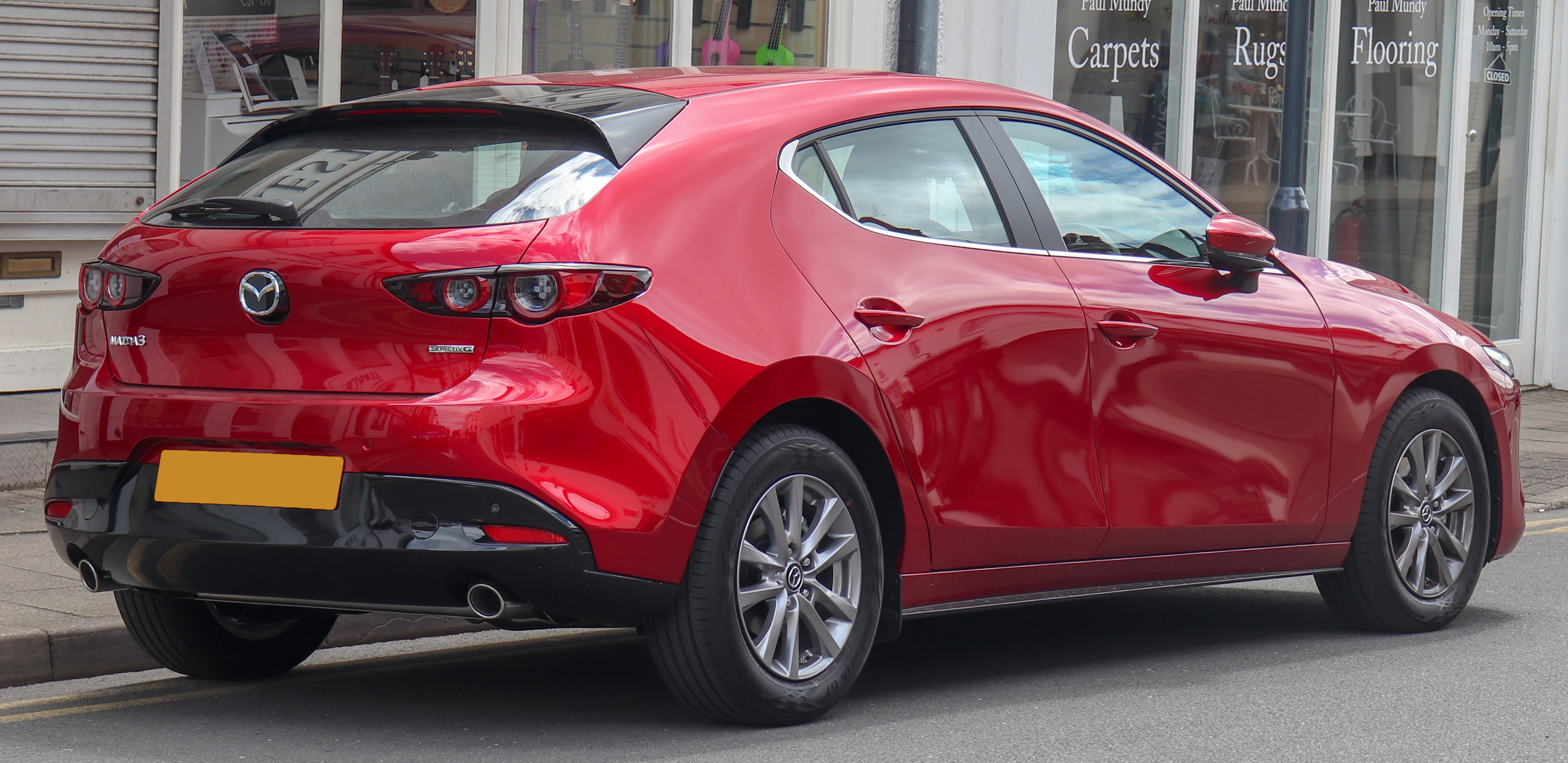
Rear view (hatchback)

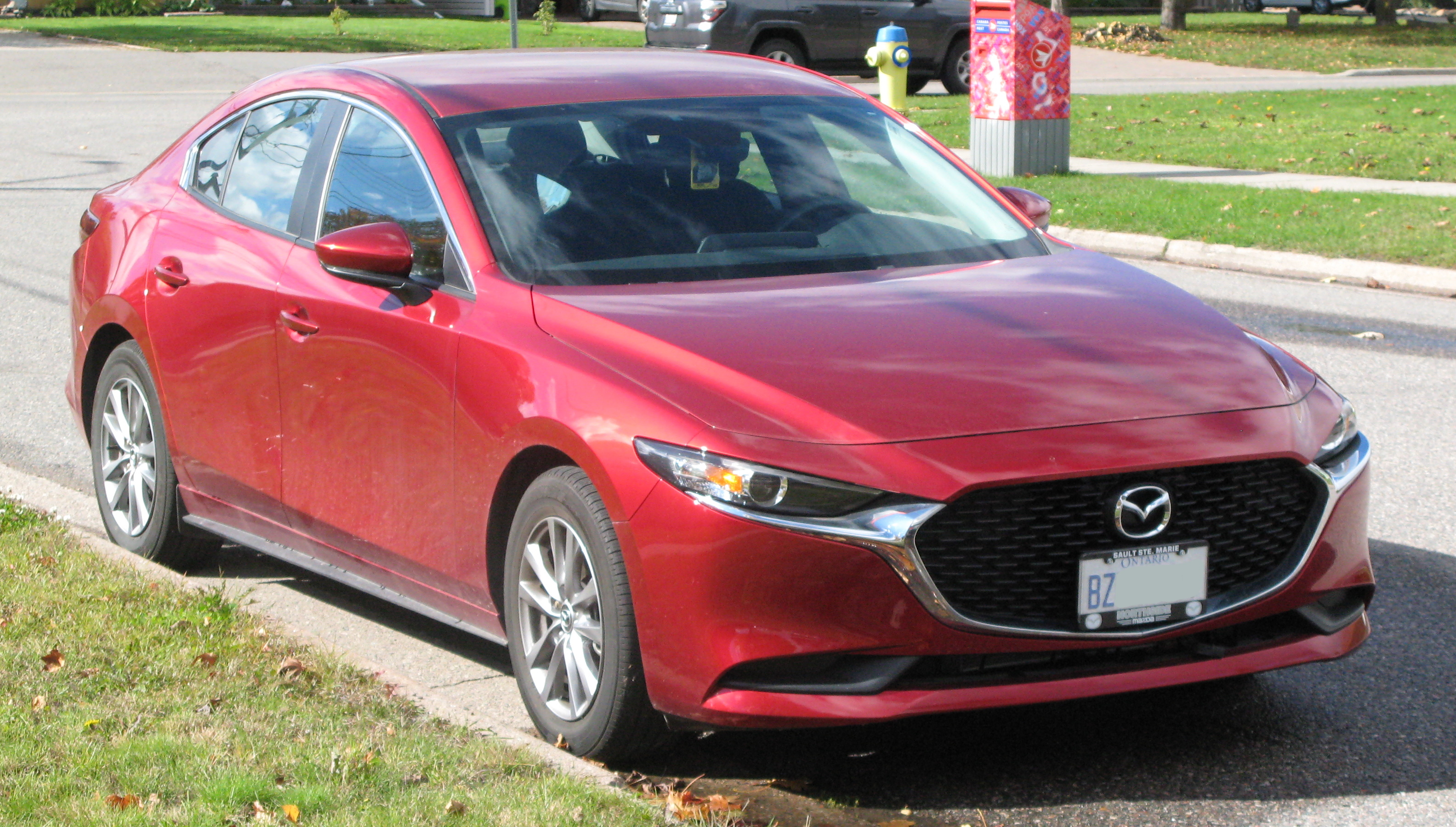
Mazda3 sedan

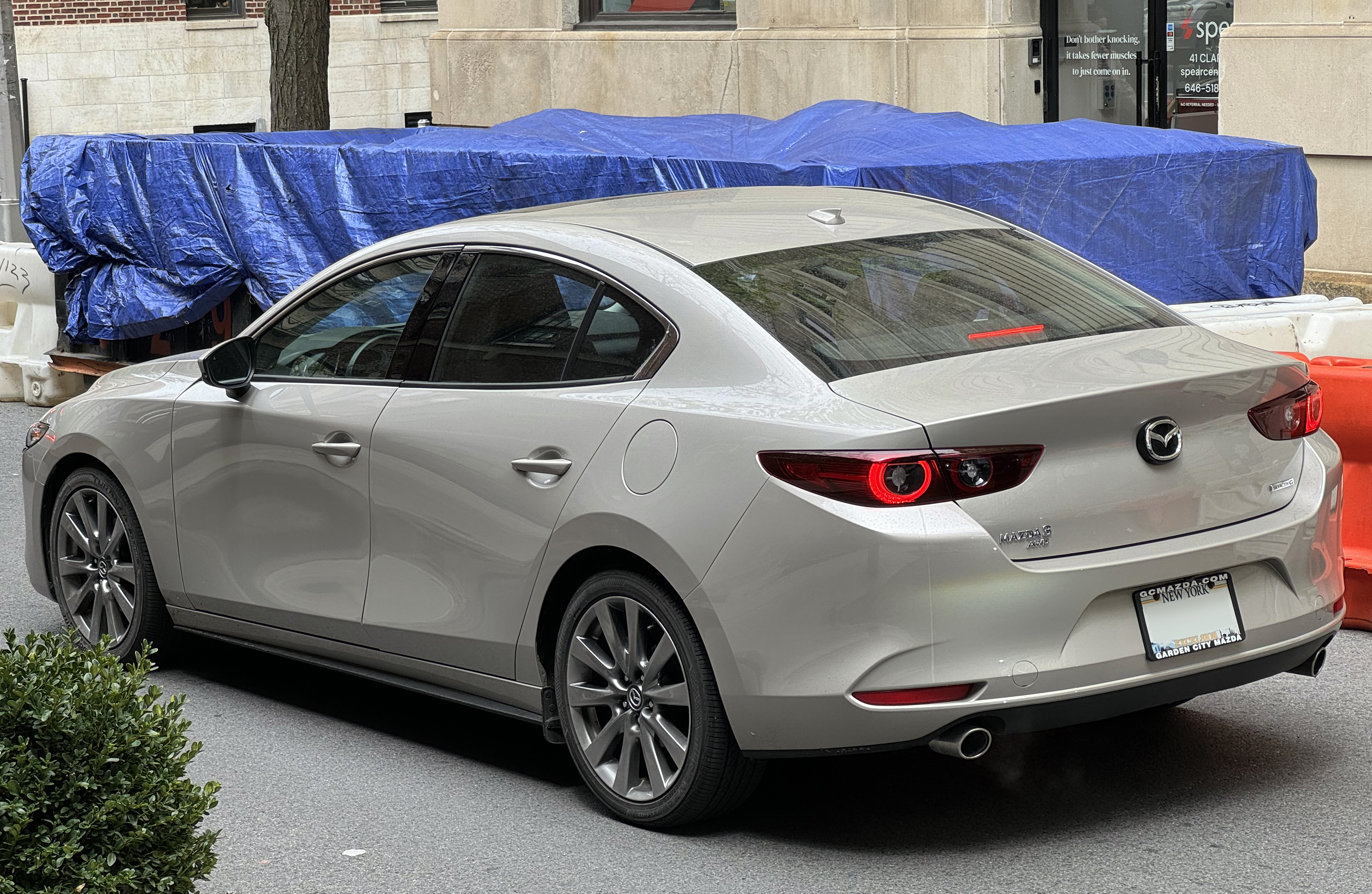
Rear view (sedan)

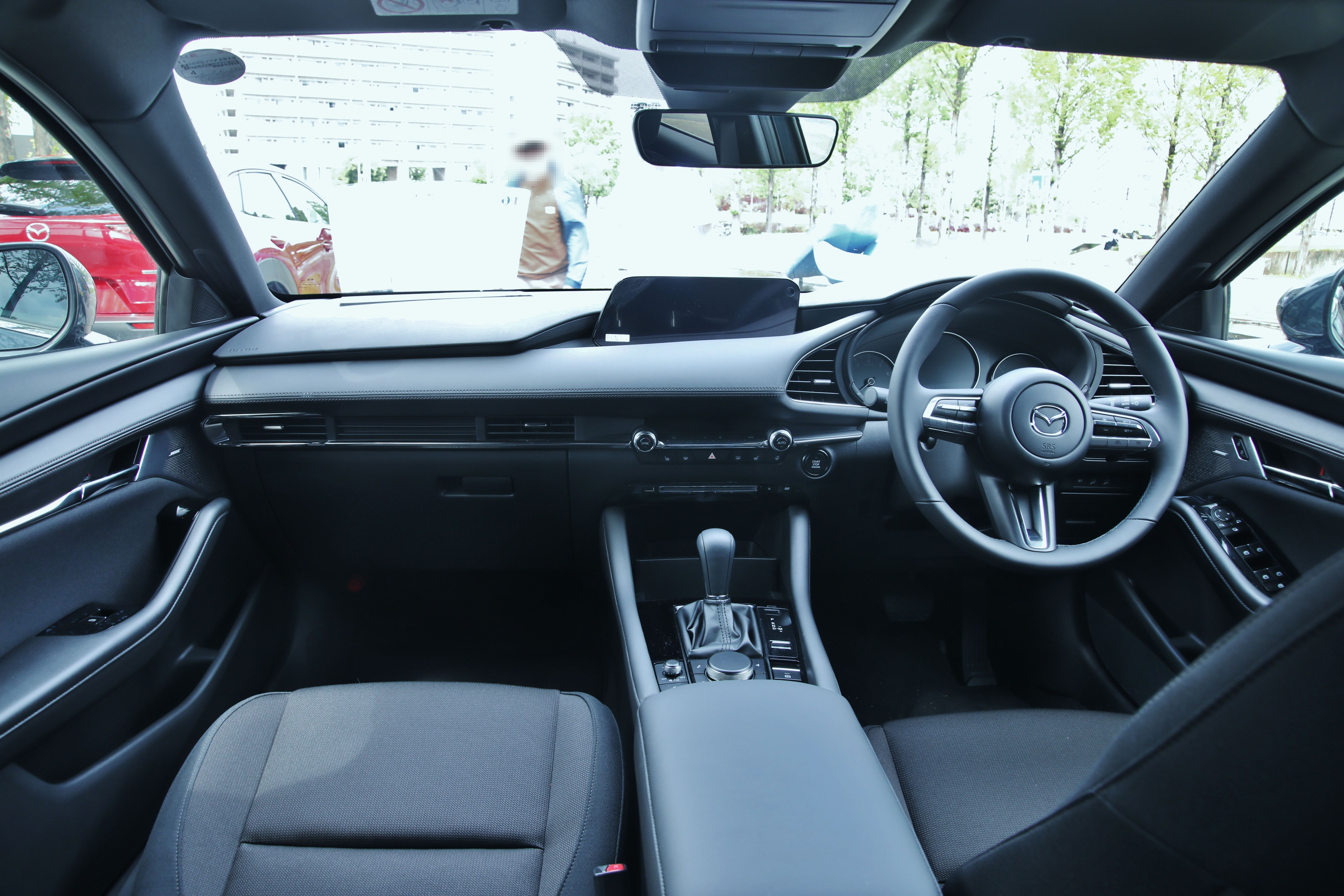
Interior

=== Markets ===
==== Americas ====
===== Mexico =====
The Mazda3 was launched in Mexico in February 2019, the first country to make its global debut in both hatchback and sedan body styles. At launch, three trim levels were available: i (only for Sedan), i Sport and i Grand Touring. All variants are powered by a 2.5-litre Skyactiv-G petrol engine. For Mexico, the Mazda3 is locally built at the Mazda de México Vehicle Operation (MMVO).

In July 2020, the 2.5-litre turbocharged petrol engine was added to the line-up, it came only as a Hatchback body style, it is available in two trim levels: i Grand Touring and Signature.

In January 2022, the Mazda3 Sedan receives the turbocharged engine option for the Signature trim, and the e-Skyactiv-G mild hybrid petrol for the i-Sport trim.

===== Canada and the United States =====
The Mazda3 made its Canadian and American debut in March 2019, in both hatchback (as 'Sport' in Canada) and sedan body styles. Two engines were available at launch: 2.0-litre Skyactiv-G petrol (not available in US) and 2.5-litre Skyactiv-G petrol, with the option of all wheel drive for the first time. For the US market, there were three packages available: Select, Preferred, and Premium. For Canadian market, there were three trim levels available: GX, GS, and GT. There were Convenience, Luxury, and Premium packages available solely for each trim. In 2020, for the 2021 model year, the 2.5-litre turbo petrol engine was made available, with standard all-wheel drive.

==== Asia ====
===== Brunei =====
The Mazda3 was launched in Brunei on 27 July 2019, in both hatchback and sedan body styles, each is available in Core and High trim levels. Engine options include a 1.5-litre (for the Core trim) and 2.0-litre (for the High trim) Skyactiv-G petrol engines.

===== Cambodia =====
The Mazda3 is officially distributed in Cambodia through Mazda Cambodia, with authorized showrooms located in Phnom Penh, including branches on Monivong Boulevard and Hun Sen Boulevard. The model was launched on 9 August 2019 and is available in both sedan and hatchback body styles, featuring trim levels and specifications aligned with regional offerings. Engine options include the 1.5-litre and 2.0-litre Skyactiv-G petrol engines, paired with automatic transmissions.

Unlike in Vietnam, the Mazda3 is not locally assembled in Cambodia; instead, it is imported as a completely built-up (CBU) unit from regional manufacturing hubs. As of 2025, the Mazda3 remains a popular model in the Cambodian market, with both new and used units widely available through official dealerships and online platforms.

===== Indonesia =====
The Mazda3 was officially launched in Indonesia at the 27th Gaikindo Indonesia International Auto Show on 18 July 2019, in both hatchback and Sedan bodystyles, each in a sole variant powered by a 2.0-litre Skyactiv-G petrol engine.

===== Japan =====
The Mazda3 went on sale in Japan on 24 May 2019, in both hatchback and sedan body styles. At launch, the trim levels were: Standard, Touring, Proactive, Proactive Touring Selection, L Package, and Burgundy Selection. Four engine options were available: 1.5-litre Skyactiv-G petrol (15S), 2.0 Skyactiv-G petrol (20S), 1.8 Skyactiv-D diesel (XD), and a 2.0 Skyactiv-X petrol (X) released at a later date. All powertrains have the option of all wheel drive available from February 2020.

In April 2023, the minor facelift saw the Mazda3 line-up restructured to three trim levels: Smart Edition, Proactive Touring Selection, and Black Tone Edition. The 1.5-litre Skyactiv-G petrol (15S) and 2.0 Skyactiv-X petrol (X) only available for the hatchback, the latter option become exclusively all wheel drive.

===== Malaysia =====
The Mazda3 was launched in Malaysia on 17 July 2019, in both hatchback (as the Liftback) and sedan body styles, with three variants available at launch: 1.5, 2.0 High (only for sedan), and 2.0 High Plus. It is available with either 1.5-litre and 2.0-litre Skyactiv-G petrol engines. The Ignite Edition based on the 2.0 High Plus variant only for the hatchback was introduced in March 2022.

In October 2023, the Mazda3 line-up was revised with updated equipment and a simplified line-up, with the 1.5 Skyactiv-G petrol engine dropped. Four variants are available: High sedan, High Plus sedan, High Plus hatchback, and Ignite Edition hatchback.

In November 2025, the 1.5 High Plus was added to the line-up, available in both hatchback and sedan body styles, powered by the 1.5 Skyactiv-G petrol engine marking its return after a two-year hiatus.

===== Philippines =====
The Mazda3 was launched in the Philippines on 14 August 2019, in both hatchback (as the Sportback) and sedan body styles, with three trim levels available at launch: Elite, Premium, and Speed (only for the Sportback), it is available with either 1.5-litre and 2.0-litre Skyactiv-G petrol engines. The mild hybrid versions of the Mazda3 were introduced as the e-Skyactiv-G in October 2021.

===== Singapore =====
The Mazda3 was launched in Singapore by Eurokars on 20 July 2019, in both hatchback and sedan body styles, with three trim levels available: Classic (only for the sedan), Elegance, and Astina, it is powered by a 1.5-litre Skyactiv-G petrol engine with M Hybrid technology.

===== Taiwan =====
The Mazda3 was launched in Taiwan on 9 May 2019, in both hatchback and sedan bodystyles, with four trim levels: Luxury (only for the sedan), Top, Flagship and Flagship Bose, it is powered by the 2.0 Skyactiv-G petrol engine. In July 2020, the Flagship Bose trim was replaced by the Premium Safety. In March 2022, the e-Skyactiv X Edition model exclusive for the hatchback was made available limited to 100 units.

In August 2023, the Mazda3 line-up was updated in Taiwan with updates to features and a revised line-up. It is available with five variants: 20S, 20S Carbon Edition, 20S Premium, 20S Signature and 20S Signature Carbon Package, it is powered by the 2.0 Skyactiv-G petrol engine. In June 2024, the entry-level 20S variant was discontinued and the Retro Sports Edition model was made available to celebrate Mazda's Taiwan 10th anniversary. In February 2025, the entry-level Carbon Edition variant was replaced by the Ace Edition.

===== Thailand =====
The Mazda3 was launched in Thailand on 18 September 2019, in both hatchback (marketed as Fastback/Sports) and sedan body styles, with three trim levels: C, S, and SP, it is powered by a 2.0-litre Skyactiv-G petrol engine. It is locally assembled at the AutoAlliance Thailand plant in Rayong. The Carbon Edition was introduced for both hatchback and sedan in October 2022.

===== Vietnam =====
The Mazda3 was launched in Vietnam on 4 November 2019, in both hatchback (as 'Sport'), and sedan body styles, with three trim levels available at launch: Deluxe, Luxury, and Premium. Engine options include a 1.5-litre and 2.0-litre Skyactiv-G petrol engines. Both bodystyles are locally assembled at Truong Hai Auto Corporation plant in Quảng Nam Province. In September 2022, Mazda dropped the 2.0-litre Skyactiv-G petrol engine option in Vietnam, with the trim levels remain unchanged.

==== Europe ====
The Mazda3 made its European debut in March 2019, in both hatchback and sedan body styles. Three engines were available at launch: 1.8-litre Skyactiv-D diesel, 2.0-litre Skyactiv-G mild hybrid petrol, and a 2.0-litre Skyactiv-X petrol. The all-wheel drive (AWD) option was available for all engines except for the 1.8 Skyactiv-D diesel.

==== Oceania ====
===== Australia =====
The Mazda3 went on sale in Australia in April 2019, firstly as a hatchback, with five trim levels: Pure, Evolve, Touring, GT, and Astina. It is available with either 2.0-litre (G20) and 2.5-litre (G25) Skyactiv-G petrol engines. The sedan version followed in May 2019, with the same trim levels and engine line-up as the hatchback. The Skyactiv-X petrol (X20) was made available for the Astina trim in September 2020. The 2.0 Skyactiv-G mild hybrid petrol (G20e) was made available for the Evolve trim in November 2021. In July 2023, mild hybrid Skyactiv-G, Skyactiv-X and manual transmission options for the Mazda3 line-up were discontinued.

===== New Zealand =====
The Mazda3 went on sale in New Zealand on 1 June 2019, in both hatchback and sedan body styles, with three trim levels available at launch: GSX, GTX, and Limited. It is available with either 2.0-litre and 2.5-litre Skyactiv-G petrol engines. The Skyactiv-X petrol in the Takami trim was added in October 2020.

==== South Africa ====
The Mazda3 was launched in South Africa on 17 July 2019, in both hatchback and sedan body styles, with four trim levels available at launch: Active, Dynamic, Individual and Astina. It is available with either 1.5-litre and 2.0-litre Skyactiv-G petrol engines. The sedan bodystyle was discontinued in South Africa in September 2021, as Mazda South Africa stated that South Africans prefer compact crossovers and SUVs over sedans. In August 2023, the Mazda3 line-up was simplified from six to three variants, with the discontinuation of the Active and Individual trim levels but engine options remain the same.

=== Powertrain ===
In some markets, the fourth-generation Mazda3 can be equipped with a homogeneous charge compression ignition engine called the Skyactiv-X. The 2.0-litre Skyactiv-X engine initially produced 132.5 kW (178 hp; 180 PS) and 224 N⋅m (165 lb⋅ft) of torque, though its updated version, dubbed e-Skyactiv-X, and launched at the beginning of 2021, produces 140 kW (188 hp; 190 PS) in Japan and 137 kW (184 hp; 186 PS) in other markets, with the torque being augmented to 240 N⋅m (177 lb⋅ft).

The 1.5-, 2.0- and 2.5-litre versions of the current Skyactiv petrol engine line are offered, as well as the 1.8-litre Skyactiv-D diesel engine. Transmission options consist of the 6-speed Skyactiv-MT manual and the Skyactiv-Drive automatic. Initial release in North America only included the 2.5-litre petrol engine.

Mazda introduced an all-wheel drive version of the 2.5-litre turbocharged petrol engine for model year 2021 which is exclusively mated to a six-speed automatic transmission. In the Australian market, the fourth-generation Mazda3 along with the CX-30 are available with the e-SkyActiv G MHEV engine, for improved acceleration and fuel economy.

=== Safety ===
The Mazda3 has disc brakes on all wheels.

==== Euro NCAP ====
Euro NCAP test results* Mazda3 2.0 petrol (LHD) (2019)
Test	Points	%
Overall:	5 /5 stars	
Adult occupant:	37.5	98%
Child occupant:	43	87%
Pedestrian:	39.2	81%
Safety assist:	9.5	73%

==== IIHS ====
The 2022 Mazda3 was tested by the Insurance Institute for Highway Safety (IIHS) and received a Top Safety Pick+ award:

IIHS scores
Small overlap front (Driver)	Good	
Small overlap front (Passenger)	Good	
Moderate overlap front	Good	
Side (original test)	Good	
Side (updated test)	Good	
Roof strength	Good	
Head restraints and seats	Good	
Headlights	Good / Acceptable	varies by trim/option. Specifically the auto-leveling LED headlights upped the rating from Acceptable to Good.
Front crash prevention (Vehicle-to-Vehicle)	Superior	
Front crash prevention (Vehicle-to-Pedestrian, day)	Superior	
Child seat anchors (LATCH) ease of use	Good+	

In 2024, Mazda3 was likewise named one of the safest cars available in the US, according to IIHS ratings.

==== ANCAP ====
ANCAP test results* Mazda 3 (2019, aligned with Euro NCAP)
Test	Points	%
Overall:	5 /5 stars	
Adult occupant:	37.5	98%
Child occupant:	43.8	89%
Pedestrian:	39.2	81%
Safety assist:	9.9	76%

== Motorsports ==
- The Mazda3 was introduced to the Speed World Challenge in 2009.
- Team Sahlen entered a Mazda3 in the Continental Tire Sports Car Challenge Street Tuner class in 2010.
- Mazda South Africa, in conjunction with MFC (a vehicle finance house) entered two Mazda3 MPS models into Class-T of the South African Production Car Championship from 2007 to 2010.
- Mazda3 is used in the seed category NASCAR Stock V6 Series in Mexico.
- The 2020 Mazda3 TCR program was announced in October 2019 but canceled in August 2020 due to the COVID-19 pandemic.

== Awards ==
The fourth generation Mazda3 won the World Car Design of the Year award in 2020, granted by the World Car Awards (WCA).

In 2024, the Mazda3 was one of four compact cars listed on Car and Driver's Editors' Choice.

== Sales ==
Year	Japan	U.S.	Europe (Note: Europe: 2020 EU 27 + UK + Switzerland + Norway + Iceland)	Canada	Australia	China	Thailand	Vietnam	Mexico	Malaysia (Note: Figures based on registration (Malaysia))	Indonesia		Generation
Year	Japan	U.S.	Europe	Canada	Australia	China	Thailand	Vietnam	Mexico	Malaysia	Sedan	Hatchback	Generation
2003	5,474	2,081	5,841										1st
2004	29,921	76,080	68,604		22,046								1st
2005	26,331	97,388	85,267		32,570				534		226	383	1st
2006	24,200	94,438	74,802		32,432	1,186			4,750	18	59	172	1st
2007	22,909	120,291	68,291		34,394	35,844			6,939	280	51	90	1st
2008	16,647	109,957	49,355		33,755	29,225			9,502	158	76	62	1st
2009	26,761	96,466	53,096	46,943	35,298	48,228			9,217	524	13	2	2nd
2010	26,509	106,353	49,175	47,740	39,003	68,616			12,016	1027	— (Note: Official distribution of the Mazda 3 was put on hold between 2010 and 2016 while the local distributor focused on other models due to shifting market demand. The model officially returned to the Indonesian market in 2017 after PT Eurokars Motor Indonesia took over the brand's operations, re-launching it with the third-generation facelift.)		2nd
2011	18,859	102,417	34,983	37,224	41,429	50,647			13,559	1934	—		2nd
2012	16,229	123,361	25,027	39,295	44,128	20,878			11,202	2324	—		2nd
2013	17,158	104,713	24,796	40,466	42,082	12,044			12,315	1165	—		2nd
2014	42,527	104,985	48,096	40,974	43,313	42,927	8,937		20,130	1459	—		3rd
2015	25,102	107,884	49,766	34,811	38,644	94,108	7,143		29,982	2471	—		3rd
2016	26,343	95,567	45,889	27,689	36,107	132,784	4,121		24,611	2024	—		3rd
2017	25,837	75,018	43,794	27,862	32,690	142,498	4,979		20,742	1439	—		3rd
2018	17,767	64,638	38,514	26,728	31,065	121,051	5,255	1,038	20,433	1117	—	292	3rd
2019	30,729	50,741	34,874	21,276	24,939	98,553	4,717	7,648	22,520	864	90	417	4th
2020	19,215	33,608	26,458	14,788	14,663	85,191	2,903	9,148	16,485	941	19	254	4th
2021	16,361	37,653	22,554	11,804	14,126	88,774	1,982	5,333	16,560	1112	7	308	4th
2022	14,020	27,767	15,316	8,044	9,639	60,029	1,553	9,812	13,042	382	37	112	4th
2023	14,310	30,531		10,880	9,079	47,274	884	6,718	26,589	1602	76	531	4th
2024	11,804	38,877		10,263	10,528	34,581	487	4,958	24,632	1099	68	656	4th
2025		29,266		14,042		15,531				1916	16	782	4th
