= 5 (disambiguation) =

5 is a number, numeral, and glyph.

5, five or number 5 may also refer to:

- AD 5, the fifth year of the AD era
- 5 BC, the fifth year before the AD era

== Literature ==
- 5 (visual novel), a 2008 visual novel by Ram
- 5 (comics), an award-winning comics anthology
- No. 5 (manga), a Japanese manga by Taiyō Matsumoto

== Films ==
- Five (1951 film), a post-apocalyptic film
- Five (1964 film), a Polish film
- Five (2003 film), an Iranian documentary by Abbas Kiarostami
- Five (2011 film), a comedy-drama television film
- Five (2016 film), a French comedy film
- Number 5 (later named Johnny 5), the protagonist in the films Short Circuit and its sequel Short Circuit 2

== Television and radio ==
- TV5 Network, commonly referred to as TV5, a Philippine media company
- TV5 (Philippine TV network), a television network in the Philippines (currently known as TV5 from 2008 to 2018 and again since 2020), owned by TV5 Network
- 5 (British TV channel), a British television channel sometimes known as Channel 5
- BBC Radio 5 Live, a British radio station

== People ==
- Carsten O. Five (born 1949), Norwegian editor and politician
- Håkon Five (1880–1944), Norwegian politician
- Kaci Kullmann Five (1951–2017), Norwegian politician
- Ole Olsen Five (1846–1930), Norwegian teacher and politician
- Tom Five (Thomas Neil Guay, born 1965), American guitarist

== Music ==
- Five (ballet), a ballet by Jean-Pierre Bonnefoux

=== Musicians ===
- #5, the pseudonym of American musician Craig Jones, when performing with Slipknot
- Five (group), a British boy band, stylised 5ive
- F5ve, a Japanese girl group formed in 2022
- The5, a collective of Arab boy singers with band members from Algeria, Morocco, Egypt and Lebanon
- The Five (composers), a group of 19th-century Russian composers

=== Albums ===
- 5 (Alizée album)
- 5 (Berryz Kobo album)
- 5, by Big Mama
- 5 (Die Antwoord EP)
- 5 (Do As Infinity album)
- 5 (Ed Sheeran album), 2015
- 5 (Fanatic Crisis album), 2002
- 5 (Flow album)
- 5 (Marieke), by Jacques Brel
- 5 (J. J. Cale album)
- 5 (Lamb album)
- 5 (Lenny Kravitz album)
- 5 (Megaherz album)ppp
- 5, by Mrs. Green Apple
- 5 (Supersilent album)
- 5.0, by Nelly
- .5: The Gray Chapter, by Slipknot
- #5, by Suburban Kids with Biblical Names
- Five (The Agonist album)
- Five (Tony Banks album)
- Five (Circus Devils album)
- Five (Dave Douglas album)
- Five (Fancy album)
- Five (Five album), styled 5ive
- Five (Goodbye Mr Mackenzie album)
- Five (Greg Howe album)
- Five (Prince Royce album)
- Five (Ralph Bowen album)
- Five (Shinee album)
- Five (Sugarcult EP)
- Five (White Lies album)
- Fifth (The Autumn Defense album)
- Fifth (Lee Michaels album)
- Fifth (Soft Machine album)
- No.5 (2PM album), by 2PM
- No. 5 (Morning Musume album)
- Number 5 (Ling Tosite Sigure album)
- Number 5 (Steve Miller Band album)
- Joan Baez/5, a 1964 album by Joan Baez
- Five Hollywood Undead album)
- Five (EP), by Ayumi Hamasaki
- V, Siam Shade album

=== Songs ===
- "Five" (Meisa Kuroki song), a song by Japanese singer Meisa Kuroki
- "Five", a song by Dierks Bentley from his album Riser
- "No. 5", a song by Hollywood Undead from Swan Songs
- "Five", a song by Itzy from Gold
- "Five", a song on Machine Head's album The Burning Red
- "5", a song from the self-titled album by Ultraspank
- "5", a song by Matt Proxy from Trojan Horse
- "Five", a song by Karma to ^{0}Burn from the album Almost Heathen, 2001

== Transportation ==
=== Automobiles ===
- BMW 5 Series, a 1972–present German mid-size car
- Buick Velite 5, a 2017–2019 Chinese compact hybrid electric liftback
- Chery Arrizo 5, a 2016–present Chinese compact sedan
- Chery Tiggo 5, a 2013–present Chinese compact SUV
- Chevrolet Corvette (C5), a 1996-2004 American sports car
- Mazda5, a 1999–2018 Japanese compact minivan
- MG 5, a 2012–present British-Chinese compact car
  - Roewe Ei5, a 2017–present Chinese compact station wagon, sold in the United Kingdom as the MG 5
- Qoros 5, a 2016–present Chinese compact SUV
- Renault 5, a 1972–1996 French subcompact car
- Luxgen S5, a 2012–present Chinese compact sedan, formerly called Luxgen 5

=== Roads and routes ===
- List of highways numbered 5
- List of public transport routes numbered 5

== Other uses ==
- Fives-Lille, French locomotive manufacturer
- 5 (axiom), an axiom in modal logic
- 5 (gum), a brand of gum
- 5 (video game), Japanese Windows Games of 2008
- #5 Magazine, a UK online men's magazine
- Five (magazine), a German-language basketball monthly
- Chanel No. 5, a perfume by Coco Chanel
- No. 5, 1948, a painting by Jackson Pollock
- 5 Astraea, an asteroid in the asteroid belt

== See also ==
- 05 (disambiguation)
- Channel 5 (disambiguation)
- The Five (disambiguation)
- The Famous Five (disambiguation)
- Number Five (disambiguation)
- V (disambiguation)
- Volume Five (disambiguation)
- Ƽ, a letter of the Zhuang alphabet
- Fives, an English sport
