= The Five =

The Five may refer to:

== Film ==
- The Five (film), a 2013 South Korean film

== Literature ==
- The Five (gods), a group of five gods in Trudi Canavan's Age of the Five trilogy
- The Five: The Untold Lives of the Women Killed by Jack the Ripper, a 2019 non-fiction book by Hallie Rubenhold
- The Five (comics), a group of mutants in the Marvel Comics universe

== Music ==
- The5, an Arab boy band with members from Algeria, Morocco, Egypt and Lebanon
- The Five (composers), a group of Russian nationalist composers

== TV ==
- The Five (talk show), a news and opinion program featuring Fox News commentators
- The Five (TV series), a 2016 British crime drama television series on Sky1
- "The Five" (Sanctuary), an episode of the science fiction series Sanctuary
- "The Five" (The Vampire Diaries) an episode of the TV series The Vampire Diaries

== Other uses ==
- The New York Five, a group of five New York City architects, 1969–1975
- Interstate 5 in California, commonly referred to as "the 5" by people from Southern California

== See also ==
- 5 (disambiguation)
- Big Five
- The Central Park Five (disambiguation)
