= 5N =

5N, 5-N, or 5°N may refer to:

- 5N or 5°N, the 5th parallel north latitude
- 5N Plus Inc., Canadian metals manufacturer
- Saturn C-5N, a rocket
- Nigeria, aircraft registration code; ITU callsign prefix
- Aeroflot-Nord (IATA airline designator)
- NJ 5N, renamed New Jersey Route 53
- F-5N, a model of Northrop F-5
- MP-5N, a model of Heckler & Koch MP5
- SSH 5N (WA) Washington State Route 161
- F4U-5N, a model of Vought F4U Corsair
- F6F-5N, a model of Grumman F6F Hellcat
- AD-5N, a model of Douglas A-1 Skyraider
- 8A-5N, a model of Northrop A-17
- M-5N, a model of Suunto protractor compass
- 5N, a model of HP LaserJet 5
- HP 5N, ISO/IEC 8859-9 (Latin 5) character set on printers by Hewlett-Packard
- 5N, the production code for the 1980 Doctor Who serial The Leisure Hive

== See also ==
- N5 (disambiguation)
