= N05 =

N05 may refer to:

- ATC code N05 Psycholeptics, a subgroup of the Anatomical Therapeutic Chemical Classification System
- Hackettstown Airport FAA code
- Nephritic syndrome ICD-10 code
- FLYeasy IATA airline designator

== See also ==
- N5 (disambiguation)
