= Number Five =

Number Five may refer to:

- Chanel No. 5, a 1921 perfume, one of the best known in the world
- Craig Jones (musician) (born 1972), American musician uses #5 as a pseudonym when performing with Slipknot
- Johnny 5, or number 5 the main character from the Short Circuit film series
- Number Five model Cylon, a.k.a. the Aaron Doral model, a character from the 2003 reimagined Battlestar Galactica series
- Number Five (album), a 2012 album by Tom Harrell
- Number Five (single), a 2013 single by My Chemical Romance
- Number Five / The Boy, a character from The Umbrella Academy
- Numbuh Five, a character from Codename: Kids Next Door
- No. 5, 1948, a painting by Jackson Pollock
- Number 5 (Ling Tosite Sigure album), 2018
- Number 5 (Steve Miller Band album), 1970

== See also ==
- 5 (number)
- N5 (disambiguation)
- 5 (disambiguation)
