= Haima Freema =

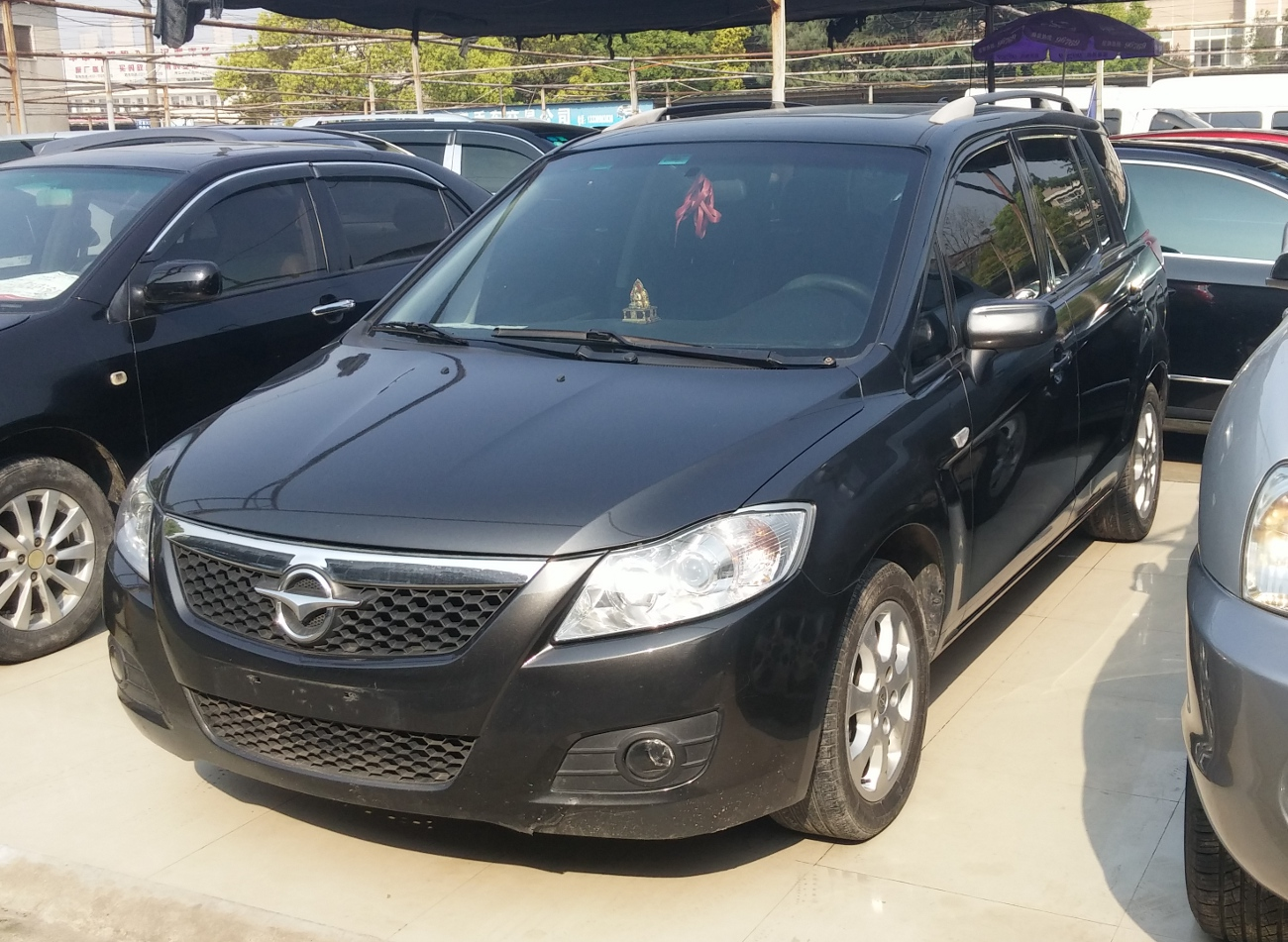

Overview
- Manufacturer: Haima Automobile
- Production: 2004–2014; 2011–2016 (Freema EV)

Body and chassis
- Class: Compact MPV
- Body style: 5-door minivan

Chronology
- Successor: Haima V70

The Haima Freema (Chinese: 普力马) is a compact MPV that is manufactured by the Chinese manufacturer Haima. Its first generation ran from 2004 to 2011 and second generation ran from 2011 to 2014.

Haima was founded in the 1990s as Hainan Mazda Motor, a joint venture partnership between the Chinese province of Hainan and Mazda that aimed to build Mazdas in China for the local market. In that composition, the company continued to exist until the early 2000s, when the Chinese FAW Group took over Mazda's 49 percent share of the company and formed Haima. However, this has no effect to Haima continuing to use dated Mazda platforms and technology, which led to the first generation Haima Freema model being sold as a rebadge of the Mazda Premacy and the second generation Freema model still utilizing the same platform.

Haima converted 12 copies of the first generation Freema into electric vehicles as part of a field test, and later launched the Freema EV in 2011. Production continued after the second generation gasoline-powered Freema was discontinued.

== First generation (2004–2011) ==
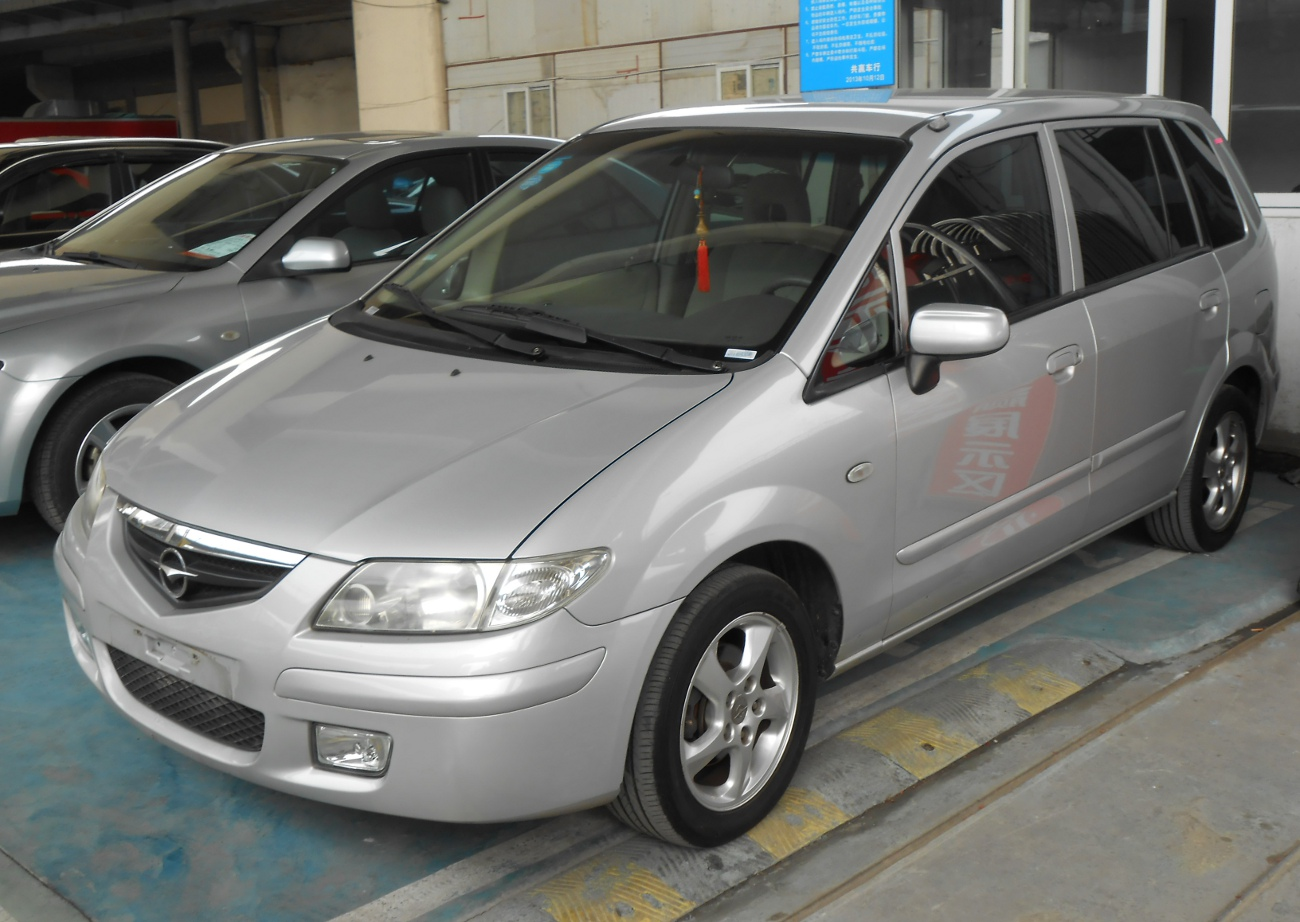
Haima Freema I

The first generation Haima Freema is essentially a rebadged first generation Mazda Premacy. The Freema model sold between 2004 and 2011 only has one source of power on the specifications options, a 1.8 liter engine that produces 122 hp powering the front wheels via a five-speed manual transmission.

== Second generation (2011–2014) ==
Second generation
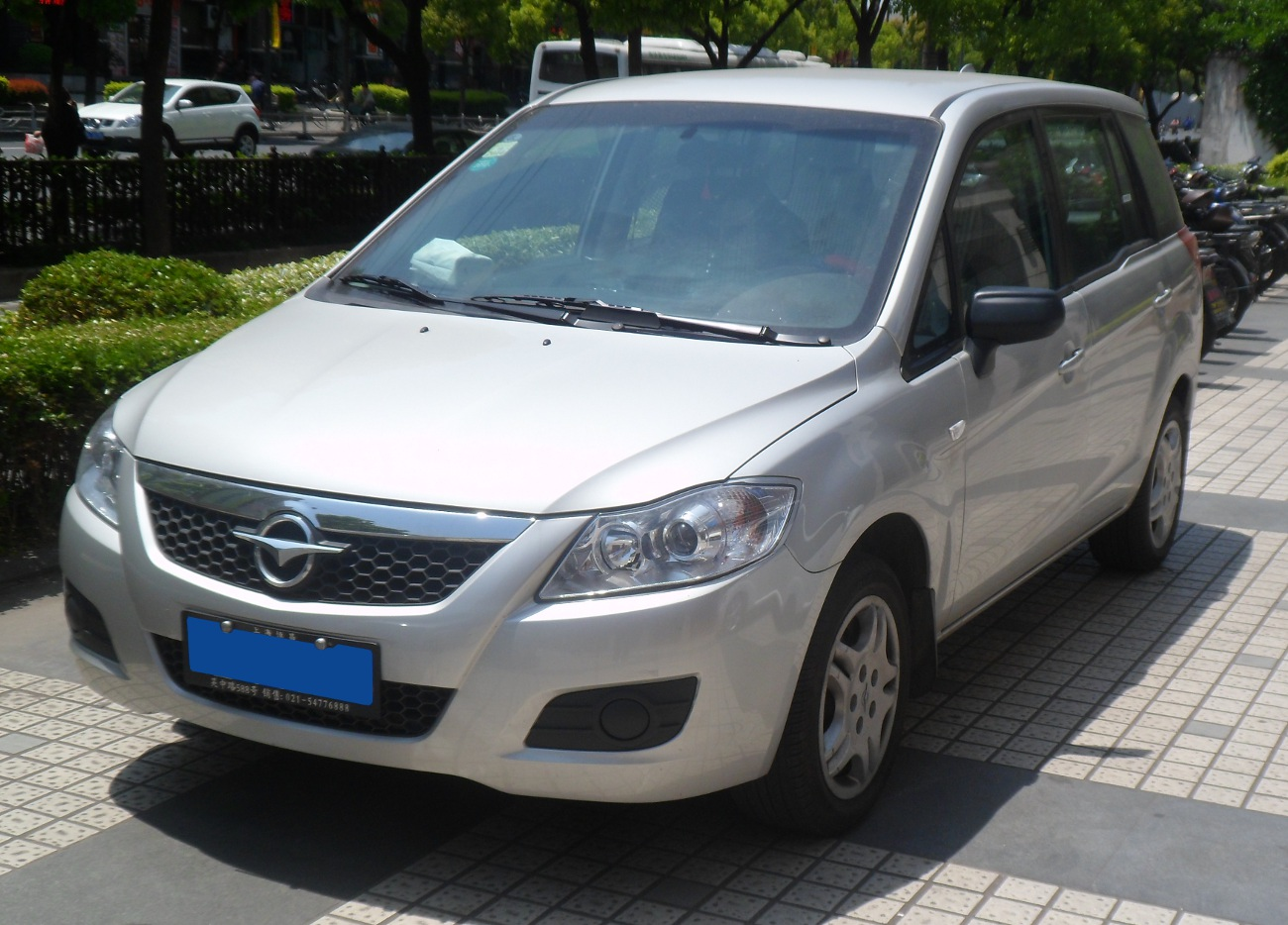

Overview
- Production: 2011–2014
- Assembly: China: Hainan

Body and chassis
- Layout: Front-engine, front-wheel-drive
- Related: Mazda Premacy; Ford Ixion

Powertrain
- Engine: 1.6 L turbo I4 (petrol); 1.8 L I4 (petrol)
- Transmission: 5 speed manual; CVT

Dimensions
- Wheelbase: 2,800 mm (110.2 in)
- Length: 2011–2013: 4,384 mm (172.6 in); 2014: 4,430 mm (174.4 in)
- Width: 1,718 mm (67.6 in)
- Height: 1,609 mm (63.3 in)
- Curb weight: 1,600 kg (3,527 lb)

Based on the same structure as the first generation Freema, the second generation Freema debuted in 2011 with prices starting at 83,800 yuan and ending at 109,800 yuan. The second generation Freema is powered by engines including a 120 hp 1.6 liter gasoline engine and a 122 hp 1.8 liter gasoline engine, both engines mated to a 5-speed manual gearbox or a CVT.

Dimension wise, the second generation Haima Freema was given an extended wheelbase extended from the standard first generation Freema and Mazda Premacy. The extended longer wheelbase made it possible for Haima to offer the second generation Freema as an optional seven-seater.

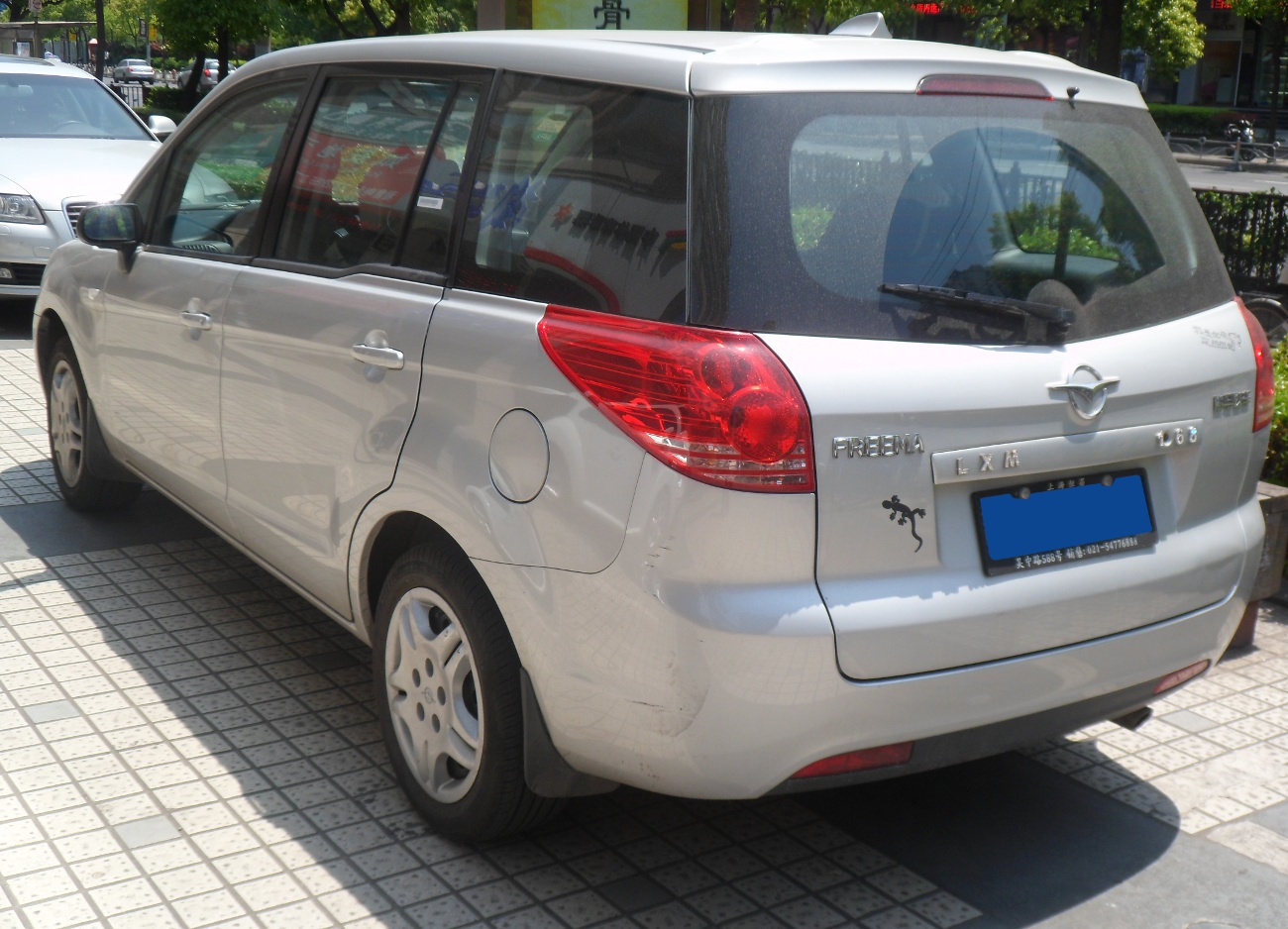
Rear view

=== Styling controversies ===
The front end design of the pre-facelift second generation Haima Freema is especially controversial as it heavily resembles the front end of the Toyota Camry/Aurion (XV40).

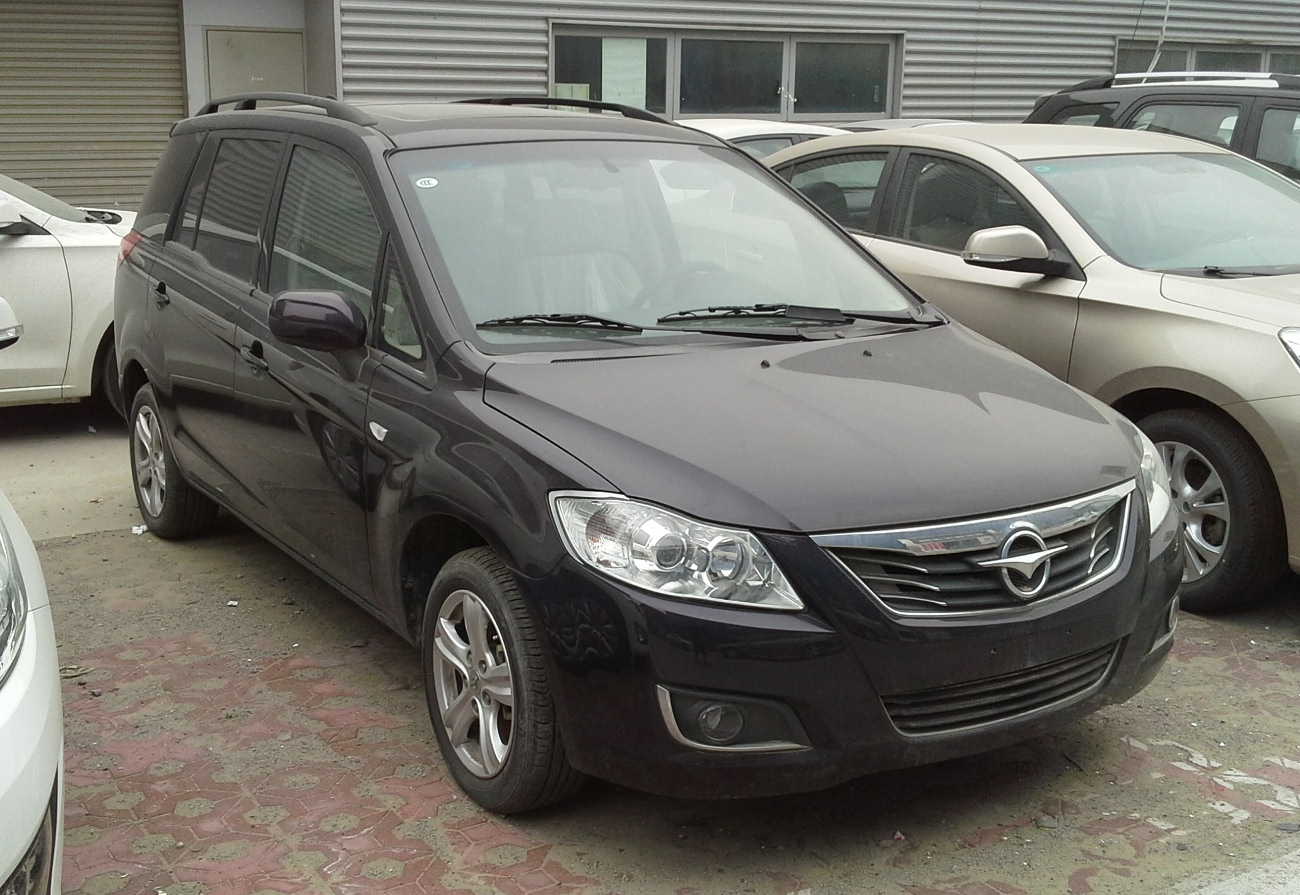
Haima Freema II (pre-facelift)

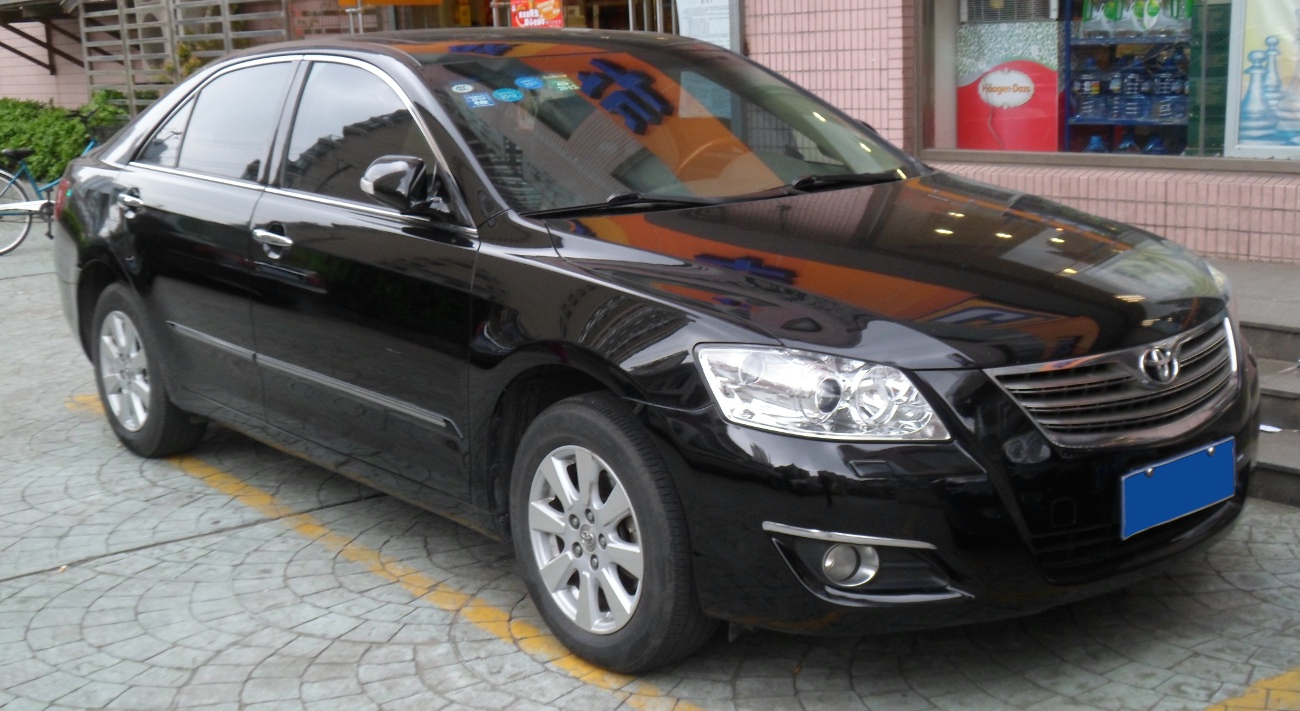
Toyota Camry XV40 in China for reference

=== 2014 facelift ===
The second generation Freema received a facelift in 2014 mainly updating the front end with refreshed bumpers and grilles.

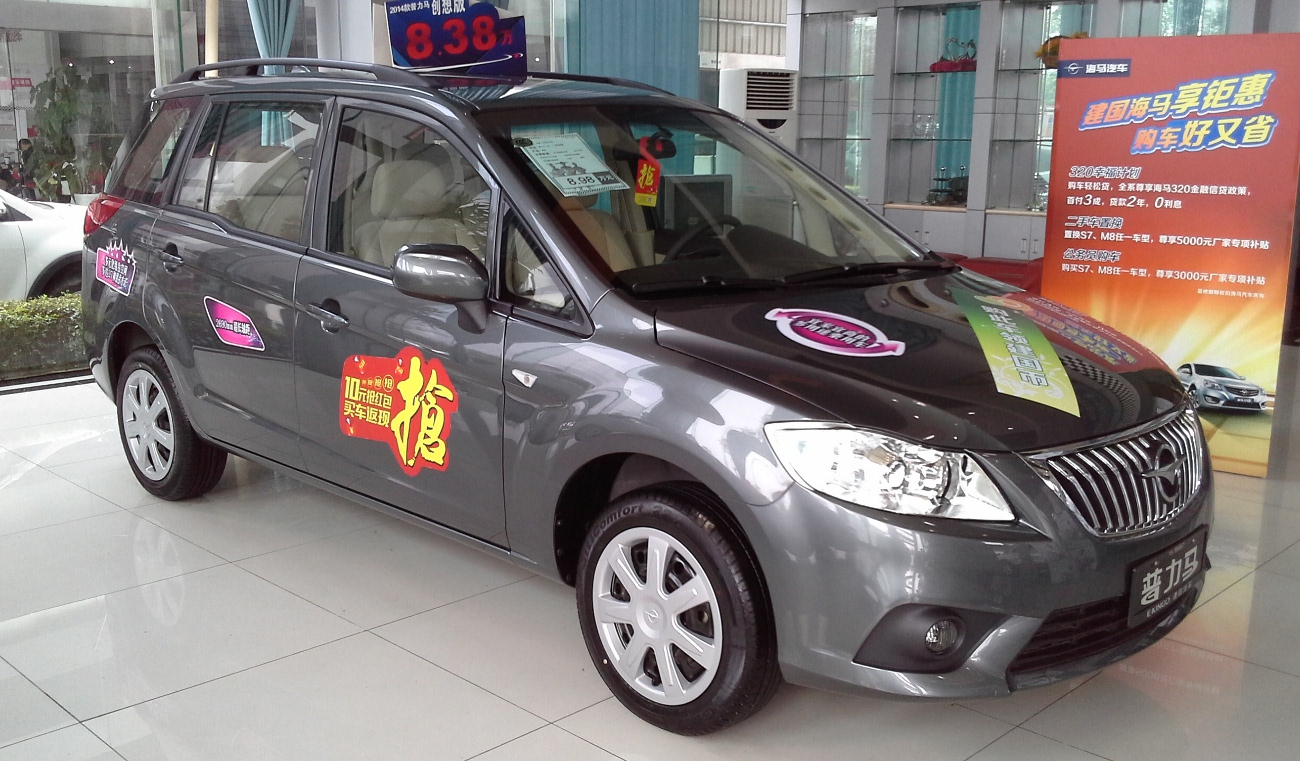
Haima Freema II 2014 (facelift)

== Haima Freema EV (2011–2016) ==
The Haima Freema EV (普力马EV) is the electric variant of the Haima Freema. It was initially launched in 2011 based on the first generation Freema, and production of the Freema EV based on the second generation Freema carried on even after the internal combustion engine version was discontinued.
