= N5 =

N5 or N-5 may refer to:

== Science and technology ==
- N_{5}, the minimal non-modular and non-distributive lattice in mathematical order theory
- N5, abbreviation for the 5 nanometer semiconductor technology process node

== Other uses ==
- N°5, a shortening for Number Five, see Number Five (disambiguation)
- ASEA N-5, rolling stock used on the SEPTA Norristown High Speed Line
- LNER Class N5, a class of British steam locomotives
- London Buses route N5
- Nexus 5, an Android smartphone
- N5, a postcode district in the N postcode area, North London, England
- SP&S Class N-5, a steam locomotives class, used by the Spokane, Portland and Seattle Railway
- USS N-5 (SS-57), a 1917 N-class coastal defense submarine of the United States Navy
- The first level in the Japanese-Language Proficiency Test
- "N5" (song), by Lali, 2022

== See also ==
- N05 (disambiguation)
- Pentazenium (N_{5}^{+}), a pentanitrogen cation in chemistry
- pentazolium cation (N_{5}^{+}), a cation that is made up of five nitrogen atoms, in chemistry.
- pentazolate anion (N_{5}^{−}), an anion that is made up of five nitrogen atoms, in chemistry
- 5N (disambiguation)
