= 5 Magazine =

Online magazine

#5 Magazine

- The cover of Issue 24
- Editor-in-chief: Rio Ferdinand
- Categories: Men's magazine
- Frequency: Bi-monthly
- First issue: April 2009
- Company: Anorak Creative
- Country: United Kingdom
- Language: English

#5 Magazine is an online magazine founded and edited by Rio Ferdinand.

== History ==
Ferdinand considered naming the magazine Rio, but felt it not a tangible option over time. The first issue was published in April 2009. #5 has featured celebrities such as Juan Mata, Snoop Dogg, Riyad Mahrez and Ice Cube.

== Frequency ==
As of 2009, #5 came out every two months, starting in April.

== Demographic ==
#5 Magazine reports on its website that 78.03% of its readers are male, and that the most common age range of its readers is 25–34.
