= Mazda Premacy =

Compact minivan produced by Mazda

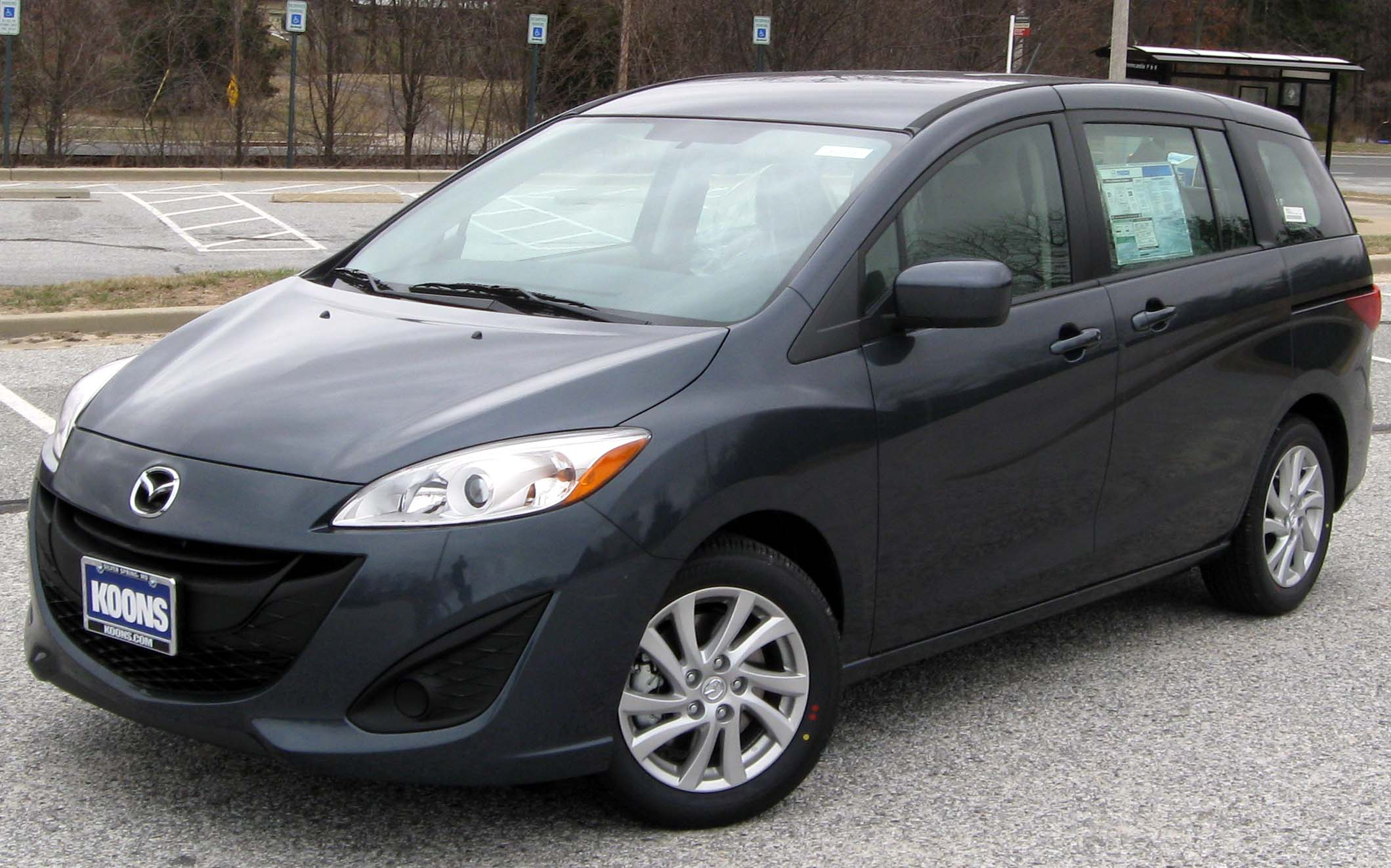

Overview
- Manufacturer: Mazda
- Also called: Mazda5 (2004–2018)
- Production: 1999–2018

Body and chassis
- Class: Minivan

Chronology
- Predecessor: Mazda MPV (North America)

The Mazda Premacy (Japanese: マツダ・プレマシー, Hepburn: Matsuda Puremashī) is a passenger minivan that was built by the Japanese manufacturer Mazda from 1999 to 2018.

The first generation Premacy was built in Japan and exported to Europe and Asia. A rebadged version was sold by Ford in a few Asian markets (including Japan) as the Ford Ixion or Ixion MAV.

The second generation onward was sold outside Japan as the Mazda5. Ford Lio Ho in Taiwan, which assembles Mazda5 for the local market, adapted a re-badged version as the Ford i-Max from 2007 until 2011.

The first generation Premacy was a two- or three-row, five- or seven-passenger vehicle, while the second generation adds a third row of seats for up to six passengers in North American form, and seven passengers outside the United States. Both generations feature near-flat floors, folding or removable second row, and fold-flat rear seats.

== First generation (CP; 1999) ==
First generation
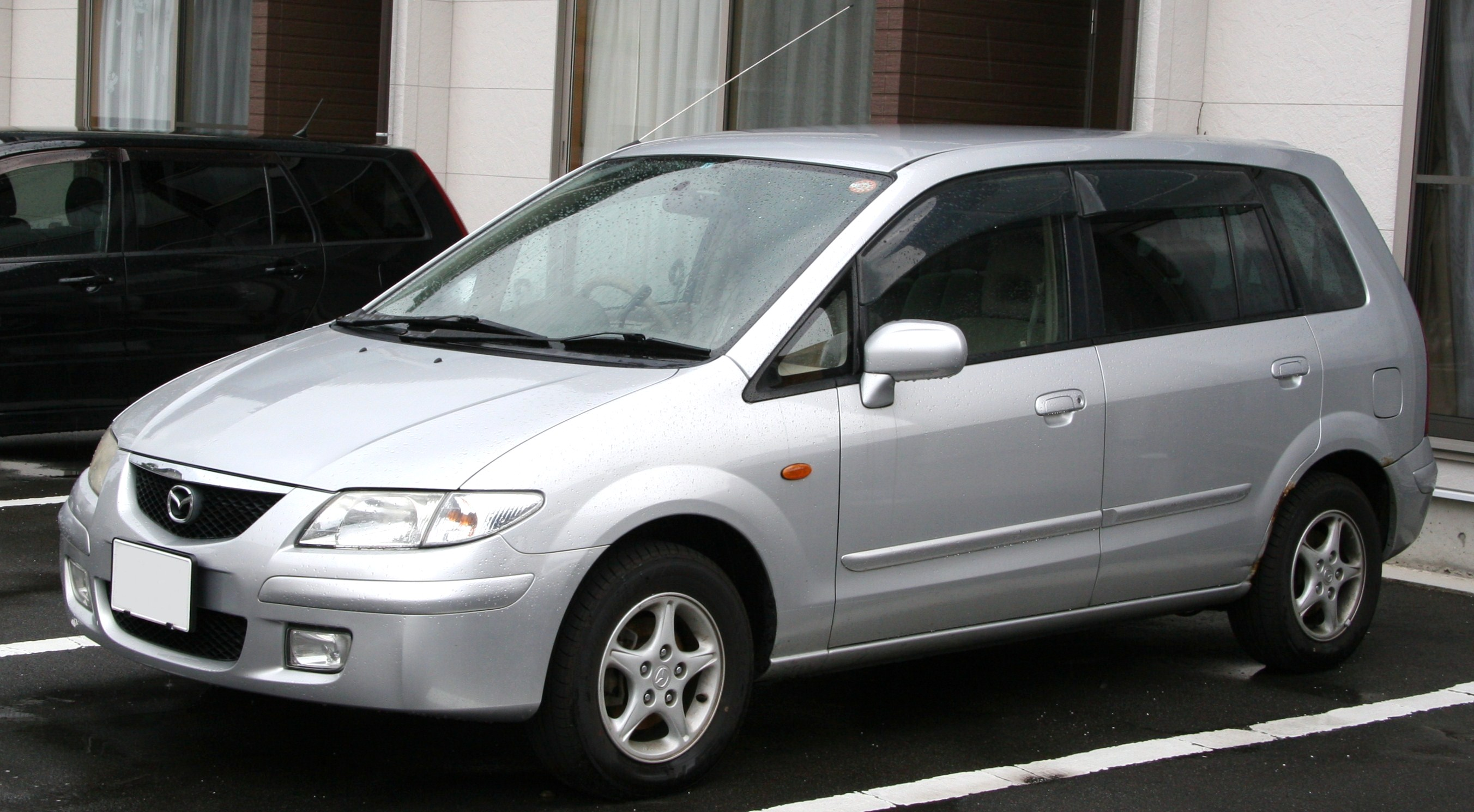
- 1999–2000 Mazda Premacy (Japan; pre-facelift)

Overview
- Model code: CP
- Also called: Ford Ixion; Haima Freema I (China)
- Production: 1999–2004; 2004–2014 (China)
- Assembly: China: Haikou; Japan: Hiroshima (Hiroshima Plant); Taiwan: Zhongli (Ford Lio Ho)

Body and chassis
- Body style: 5-door minivan
- Layout: Front-engine, front-wheel-drive / four-wheel-drive
- Related: Haima Freema II; Mazda Capella

Powertrain
- Engine: 1.6 L HA-VVT I4 (China); 1.8 L FP-DE I4; 1.8 L HA-VIS I4 (China); 1.8 L HM483Q I4 (China); 2.0 L FP-DE/FS-ZE I4; 2.0 L RF-T DI I4 diesel
- Transmission: 4-speed automatic 5-speed manual

Dimensions
- Wheelbase: 2,670 mm (105.1 in)
- Length: 1999–2002, Haima Freema 2004–2007: 4,295 mm (169.1 in); 2002–2005: 4,305 mm (169.5 in)
- Width: 1999–2002: 1,695 mm (66.7 in); 2002–2005, Haima Freema 2004–2007: 1,705 mm (67.1 in)
- Height: 1999–2002: 1,590 mm (62.6 in); 2002–2005, Haima Freema 2004–2007: 1,600 mm (63.0 in); Haima Freema 2010: 1,579 mm (62.2 in)
- Curb weight: 1,210–1,355 kg (2,668–2,987 lb)

The first generation Mazda Premacy was unveiled on 9 March 1999 at the Geneva Motor Show. When released in April 1999, the Mazda Premacy was one of the least expensive seven-seaters available on the market. It was available with either front or all-wheel drive and was equipped with four-speed automatic transmission. The second and third row seats could be folded and removed as on many other minivans.

This generation Premacy was also sold in some Asian markets as the Ford Ixion, from 1999 until 2003. The Taiwanese Ixion (later the Ixion MAV) was built until 2005. The first generation Premacy was also manufactured by China's FAW Haima Automobile where it is called the Haima Freema until it was replaced by the second generation Freema based on the same platform.

It was powered by a number of engines:

- 1.8 L FP-DE I4, 100 PS (74 kW; 99 hp), 152 N⋅m (112 lb⋅ft)
- 1.8 L FP-DE I4, 114 PS (84 kW; 112 hp), 161 N⋅m (119 lb⋅ft)
- 2.0 L FP-DE/FS-ZE I4, 131 PS (96 kW; 129 hp), 170 N⋅m (125 lb⋅ft)
- 2.0 L diesel I4, RF-T DI I4, 90 PS (66 kW; 89 hp), 220 N⋅m (162 lb⋅ft)
- 2.0 L diesel I4, RF-T DI I4, 100 PS (74 kW; 99 hp), 230 N⋅m (170 lb⋅ft)
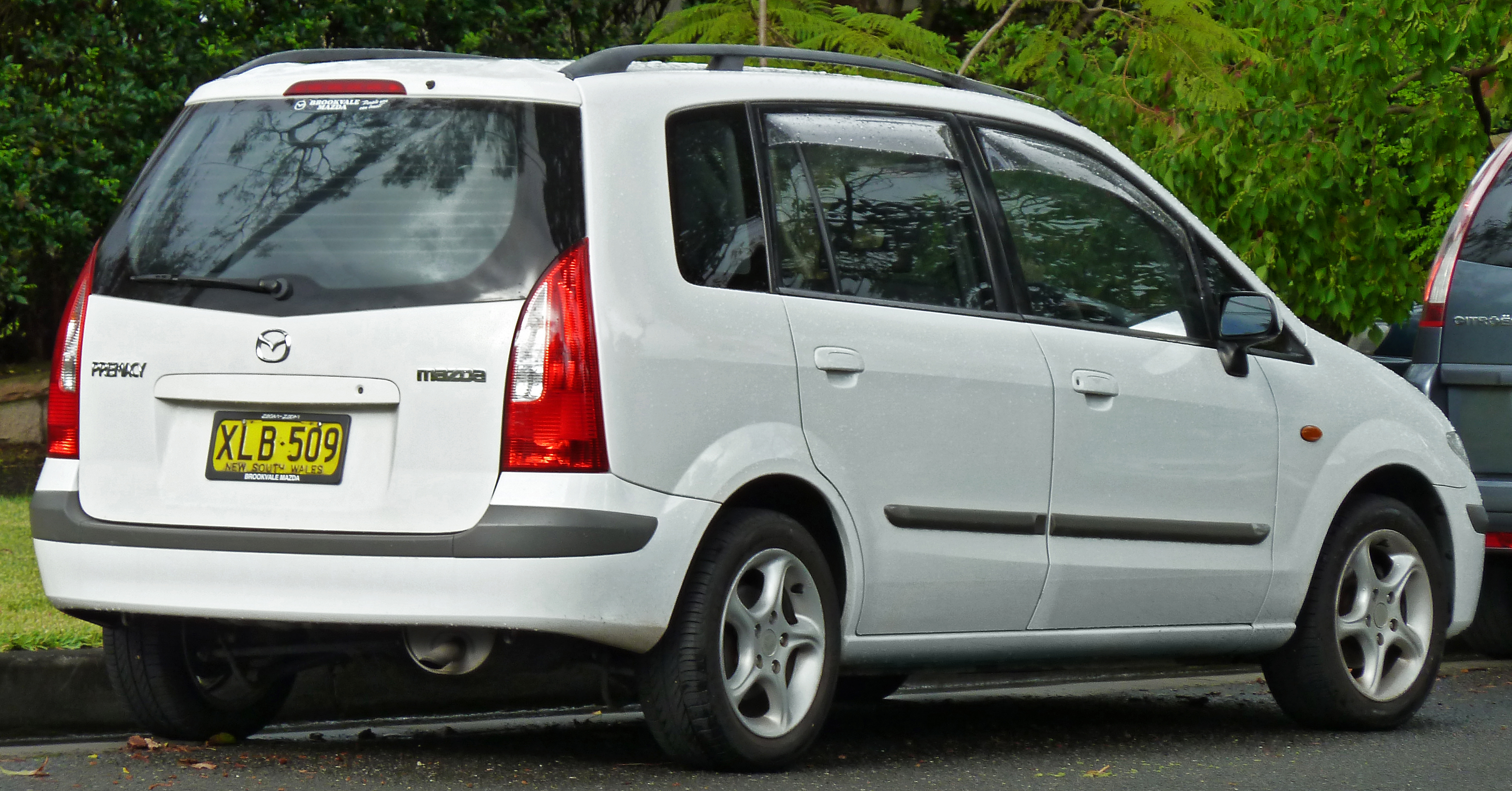
2001–2002 Mazda Premacy (CP) hatchback (Australia; pre-facelift)

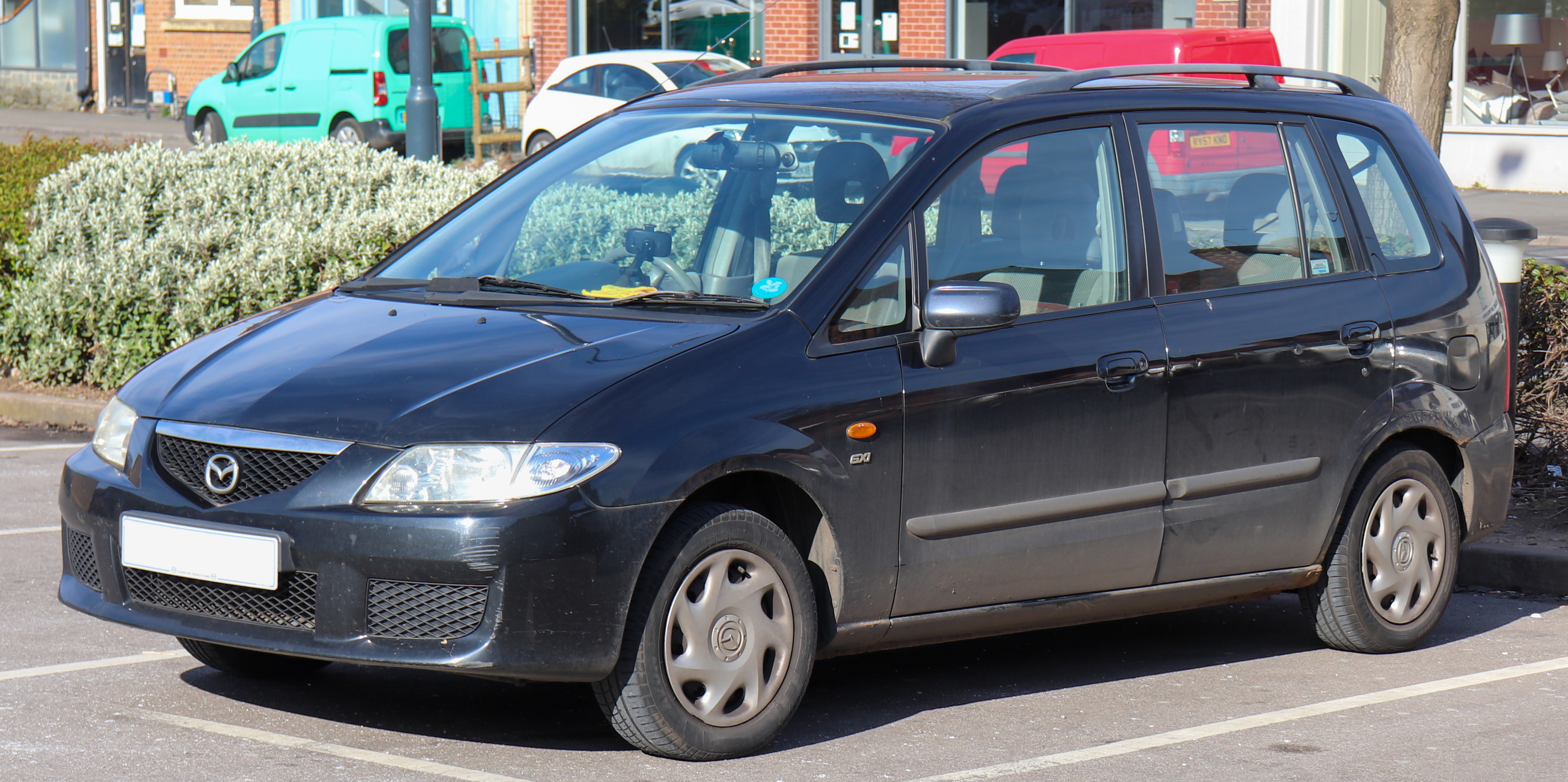
2004 Mazda Premacy GXi 1.8 (UK; facelift)

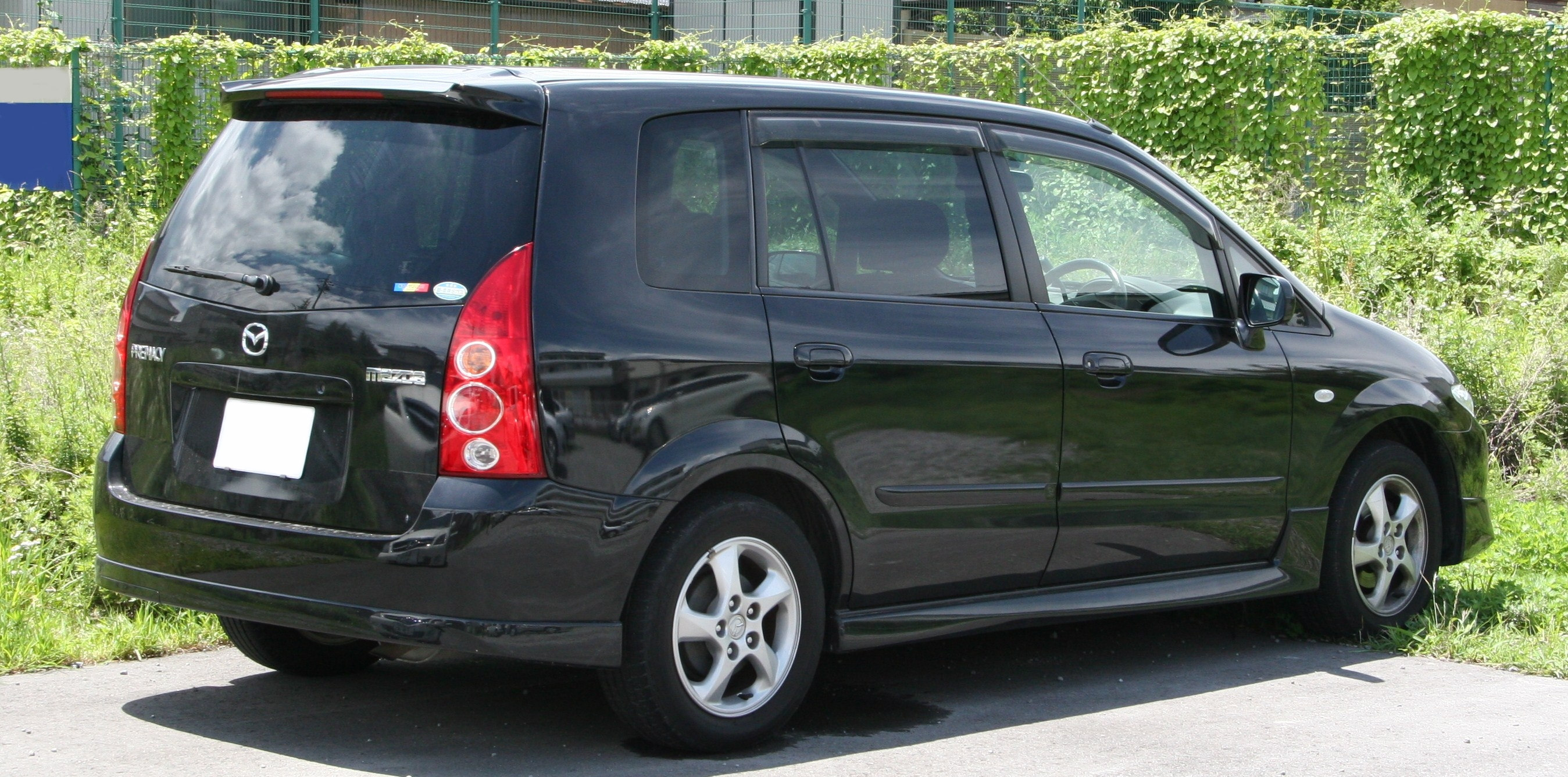
2001–2005 Mazda Premacy (Japan; facelift)

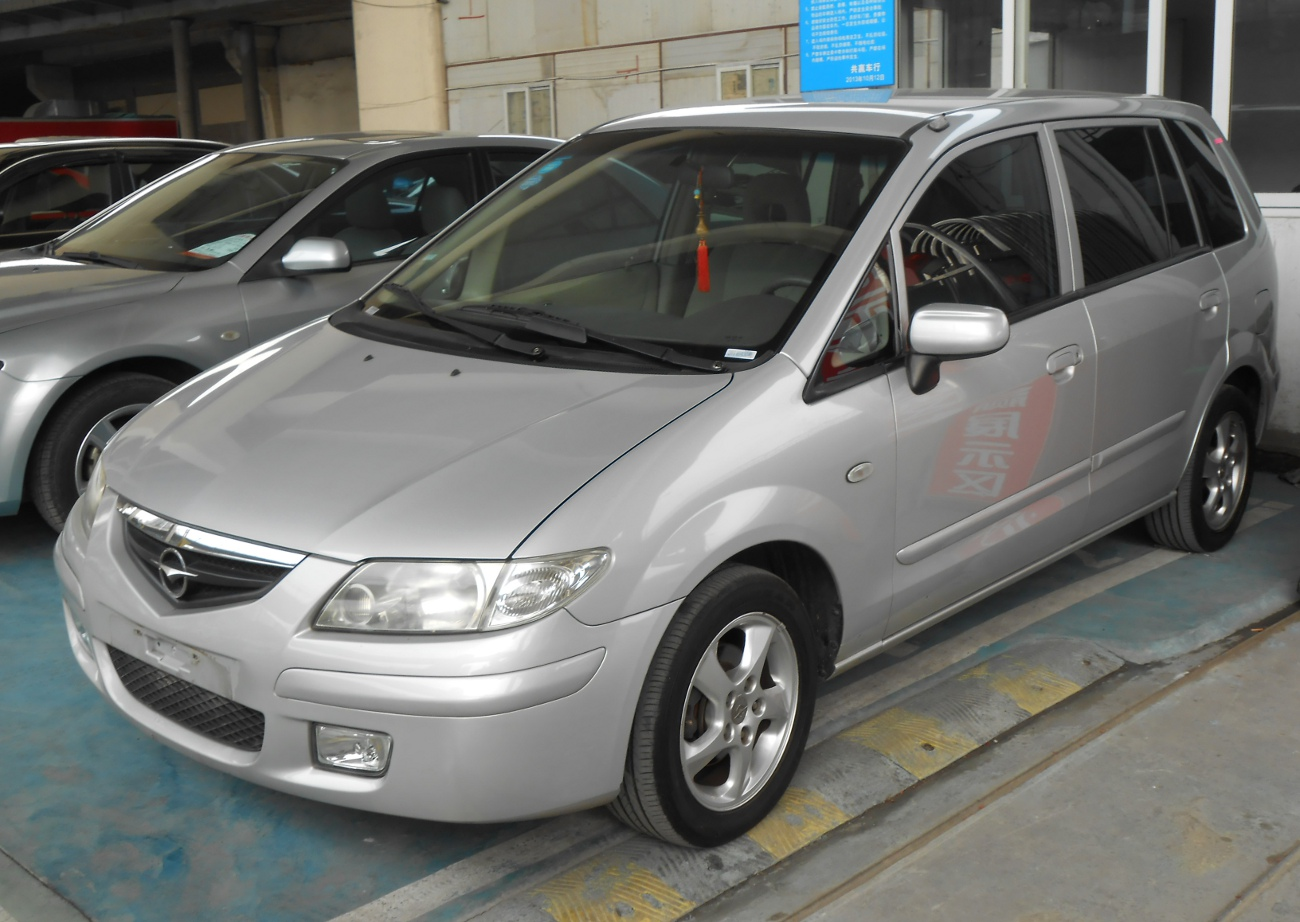
2004–2007 Haima Freema (China)

=== Ford Ixion ===
The Ford Ixion is a redesign of the first generation Premacy/Mazda5, designed by Ford Lio Ho in Taiwan. Due to the fact that Mazda was controlled by Ford Lio Ho from 1998, Ford models were able to be launched at an earlier date before equivalent Mazda models were launched, and at a more competitive price with better specifications. The Taiwanese market Ford Ixion MAV features exclusively designed front and rear with Ford's design identity and was launched in Taiwan in 1999. It arrived two weeks before the local launch of the first generation Mazda Premacy. The Halo Gold color of the Premacy in the Japanese market at the time was reserved exclusively for the Ford Ixion MAV in the Taiwanese market, and features such as the Panasonic AV800 audio system, satellite navigation system, and optional reverse cameras were only offered on the Ford. However, sales of the Ford Ixion in the Taiwanese market dropped behind the Mazda Premacy starting from the second month, and sales was mediocre until discontinuation in 2005.

The Ford Ixion MAV in Taiwan is only available with a 1.8-liter 16 valve DOHC engine producing 135 hp/6200rpm and 16.5 kg-m/4500rpm mated to a 4-speed automatic transmission shared with the Ford Tierra. The MAV name means Multiple activity vehicle and is exclusive to the Taiwanese model. The Ford Ixion MAV was sold in two trim level priced at NTD 659,000 yuan and NTD 699,000 yuan.

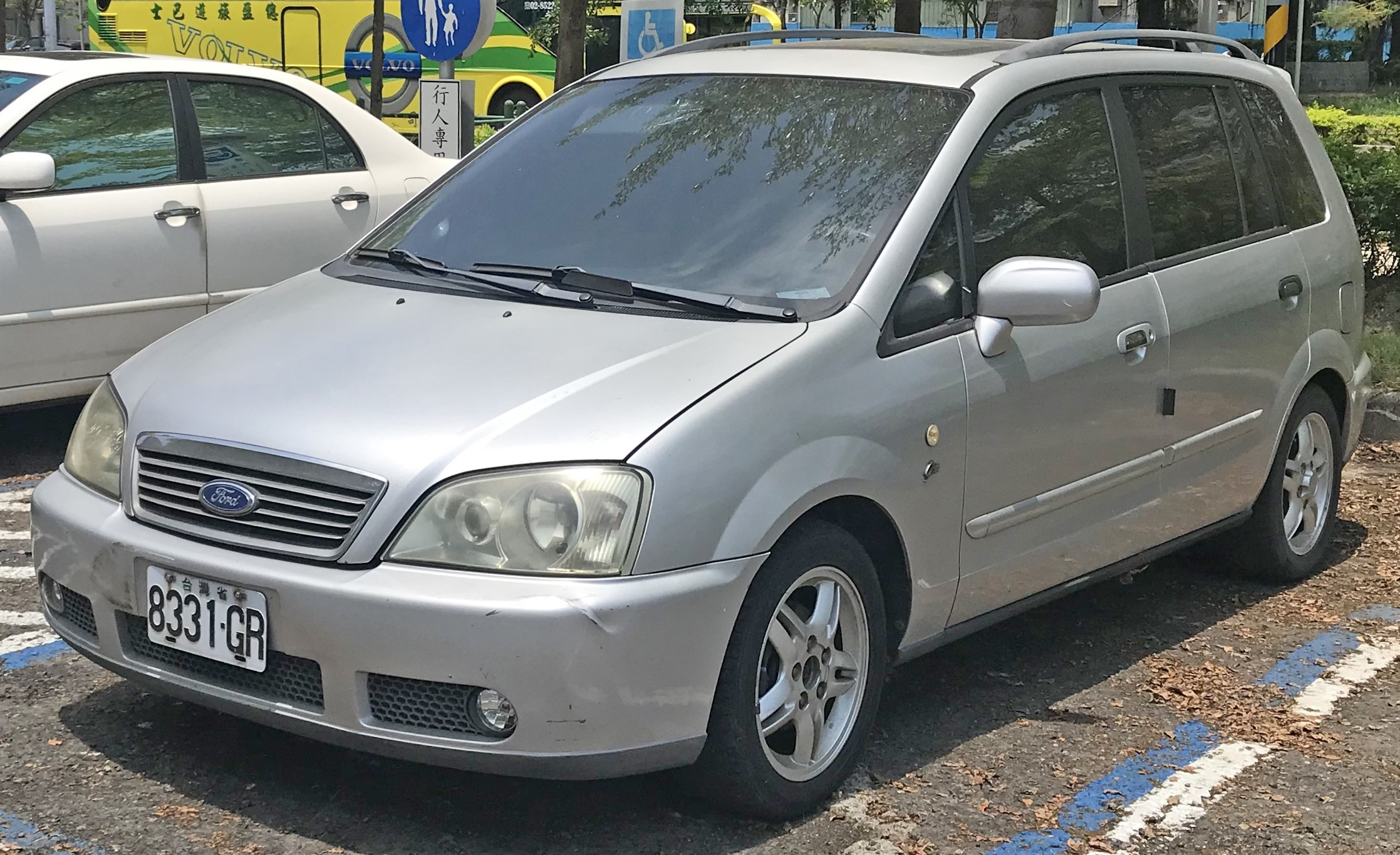
Ford Ixion MAV front (Taiwan)

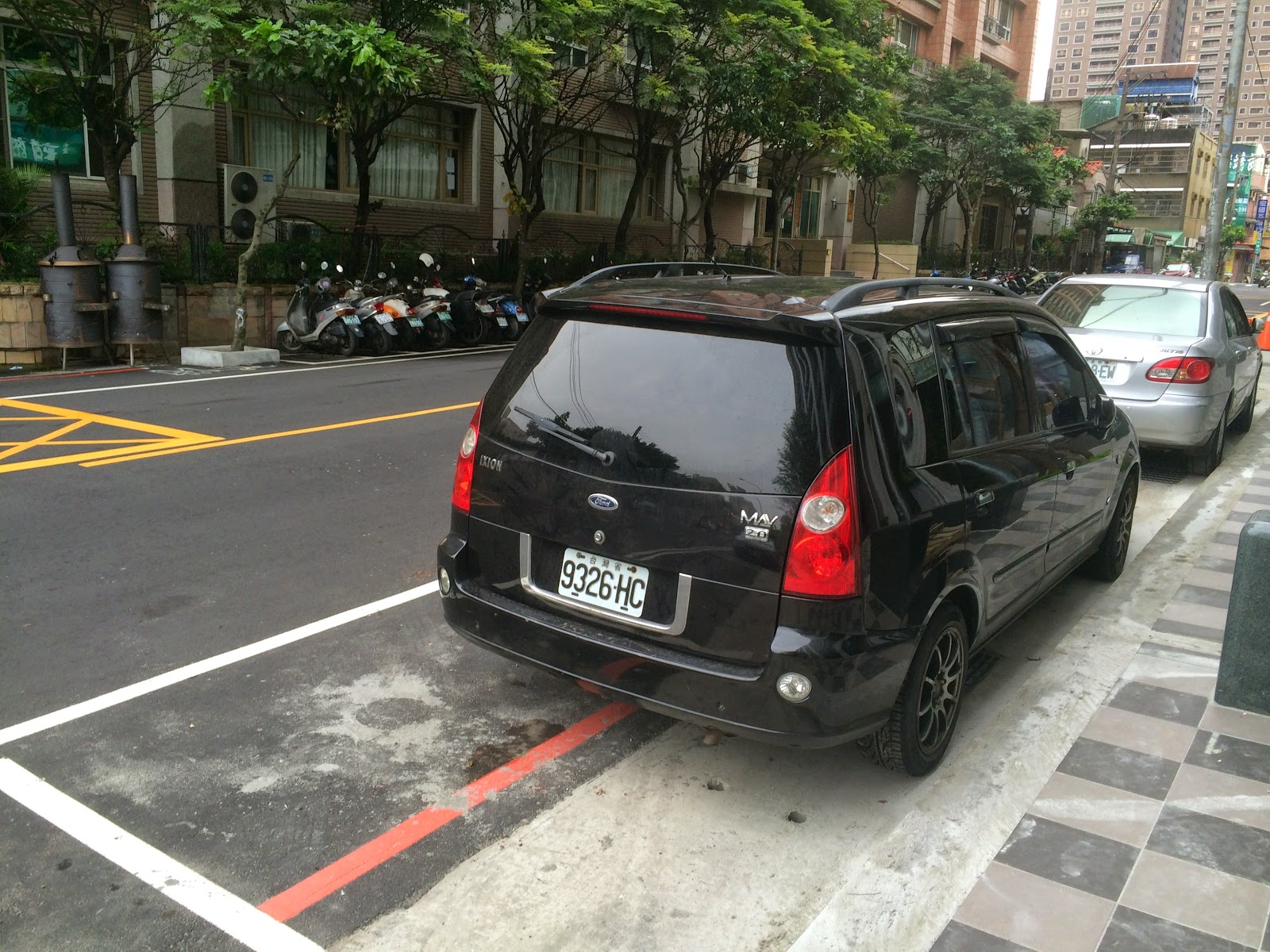
Ford Ixion MAV rear (Taiwan)

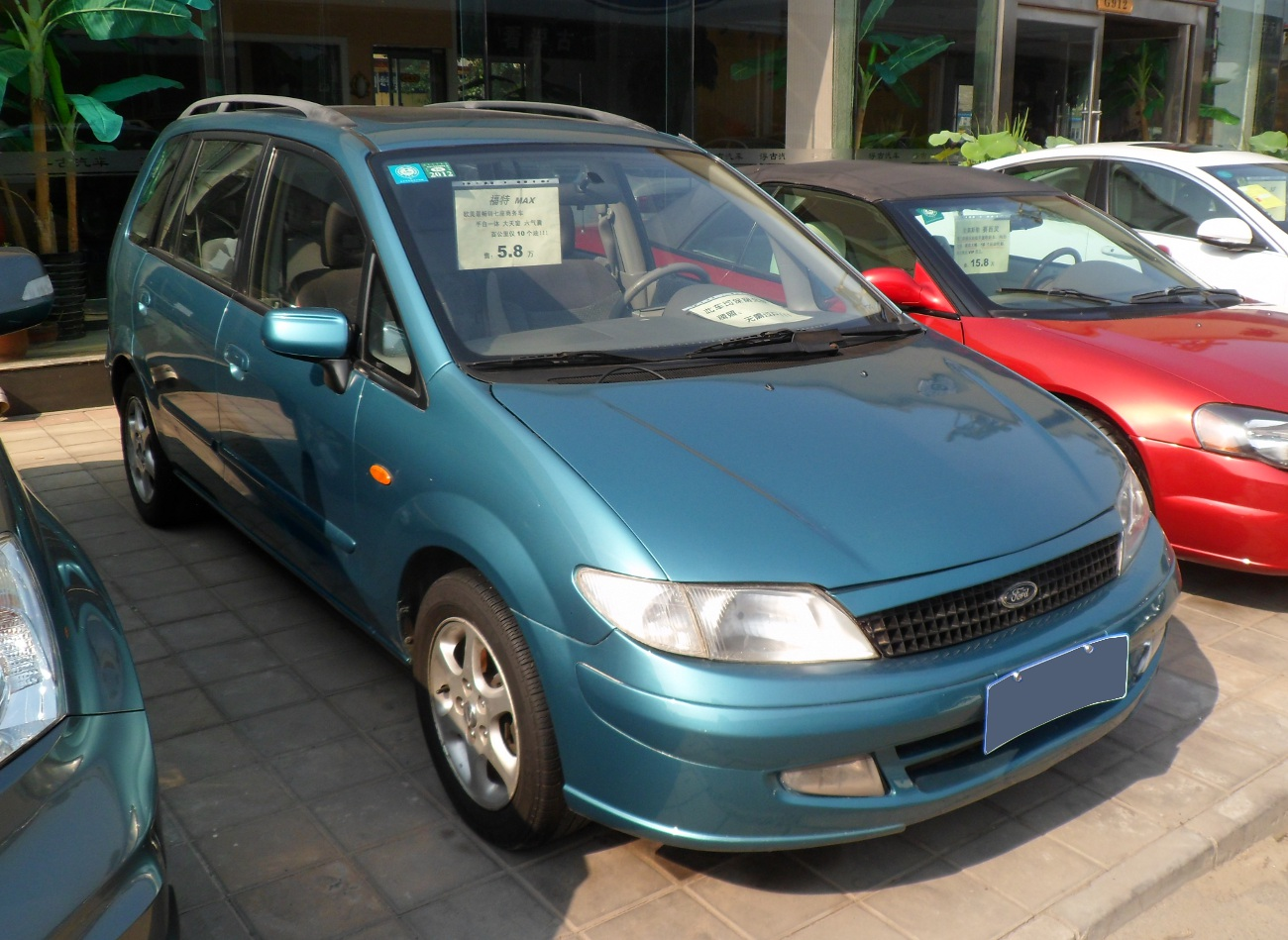
Ford Ixion front (China)

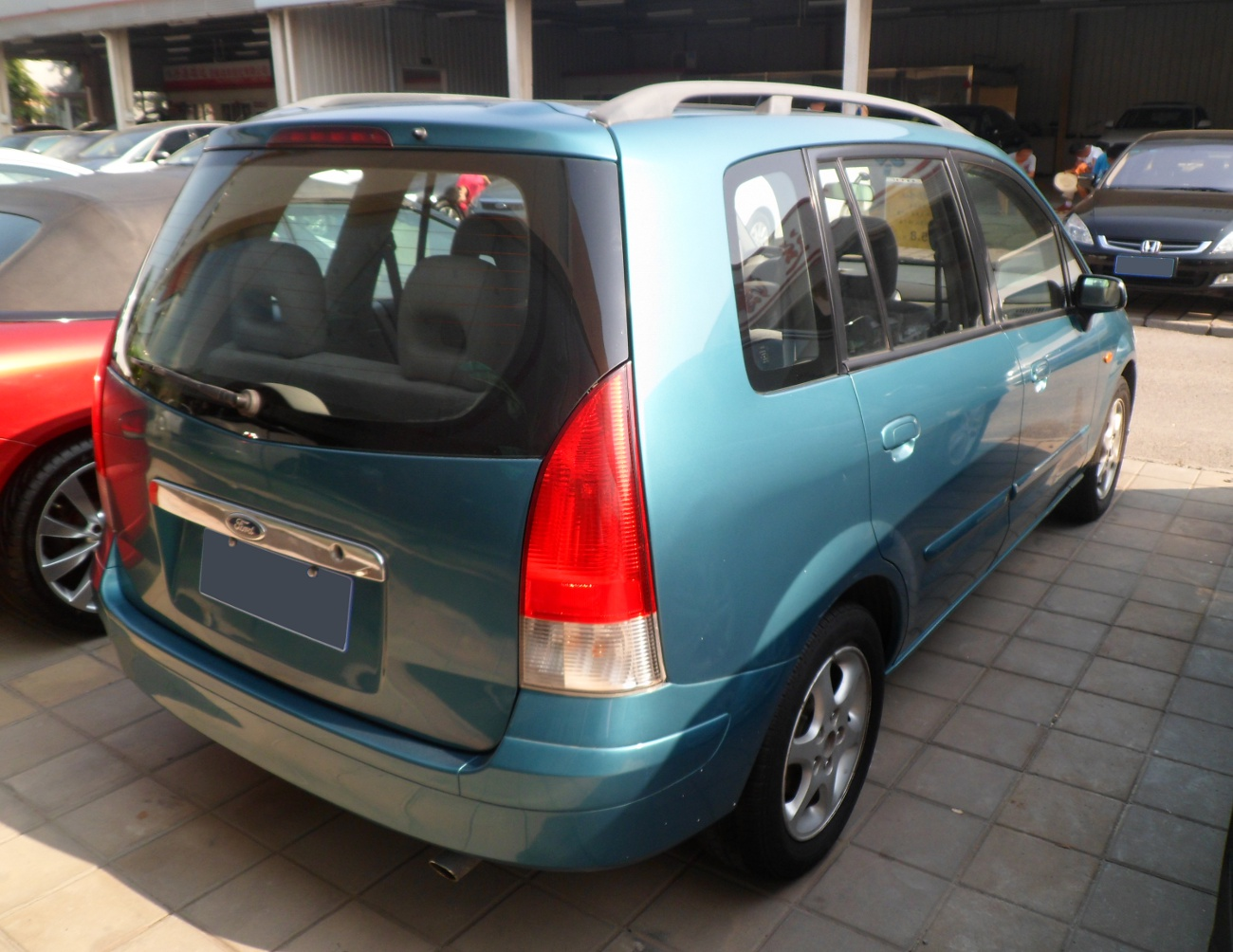
Ford Ixion rear (China)

The international version of the Ford Ixion was fitted with different grilles, bumpers and rear lights, and the styling adapted to Ford's New Edge design theme. The model gave Ford an entry into the compact minivan market in Asia. It was built in Japan and exported to parts of Asia, and was essentially a re-badged version of the Premacy with only minor differences. It was built alongside the Premacy and was identical mechanically while sold in a few Asian markets including Japan and China. The international version of the Ford Ixion shares the two Mazda Premacy home-market engines. In 2001 the model received minor changes, with the two-row models discontinued. The whole product line was discontinued in 2003 as Ford started the global one Ford policy and ended production of its re-badged cars in Japan.

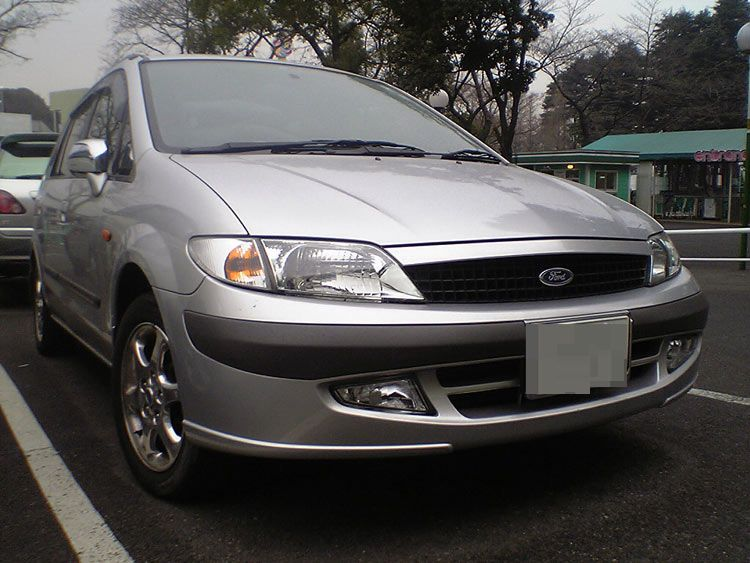
Ford Ixion front (Japan)

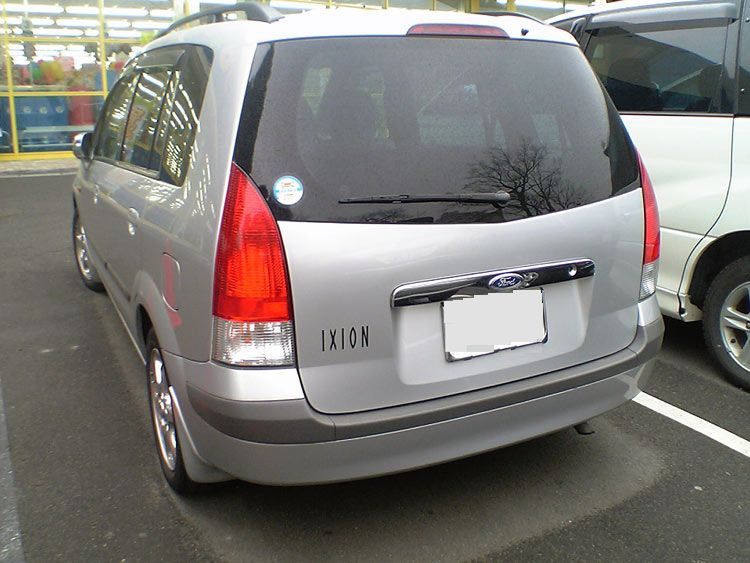
Ford Ixion rear (Japan)

== Second generation (CR; 2005) ==
Second generation
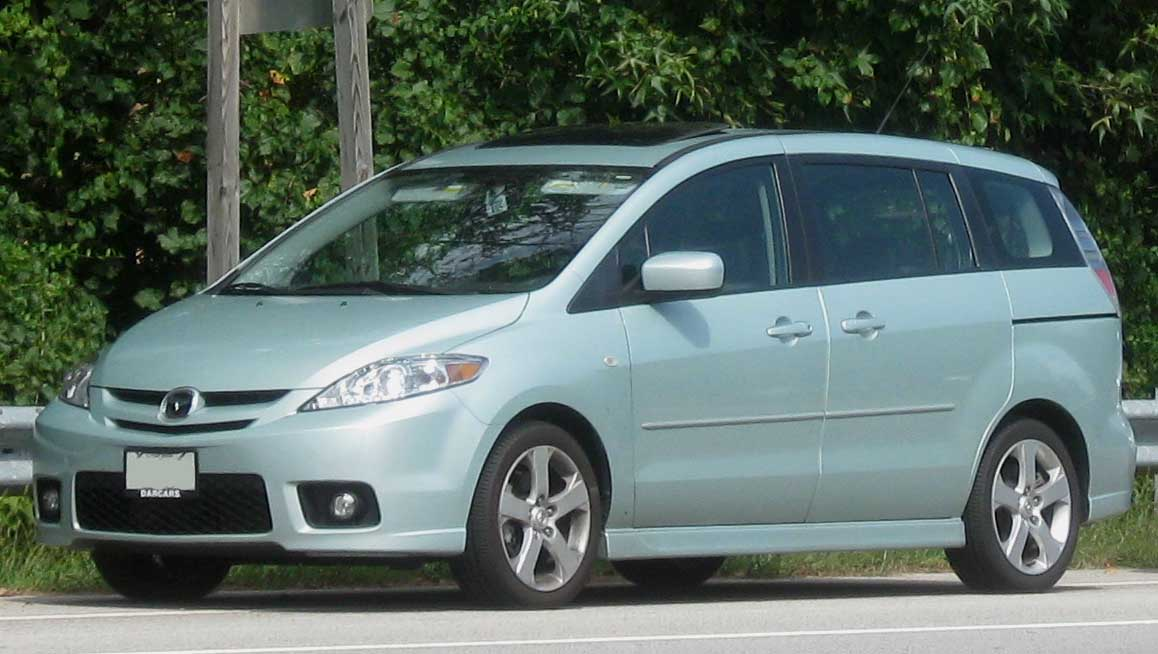
- Pre-facelift (North American version)

Overview
- Model code: CR
- Also called: Mazda5; Ford i-Max
- Production: 2004–2010
- Assembly: Japan: Hiroshima (Hiroshima Plant); Taiwan: Zhongli (Ford Lio Ho)
- Designer: Moray Callum

Body and chassis
- Body style: 5-door minivan
- Layout: Front-engine, front-wheel-drive
- Related: Mazda3; Ford Focus (Euro Mk.2); Ford Focus C-MAX; Volvo S40

Powertrain
- Engine: 1.8 L MZR I4; 2.0 L MZR I4; 2.3 L MZR I4; 2.0 L MZR-CD diesel I4
- Transmission: 5-speed manual; 6-speed manual; 4-speed automatic; 5-speed automatic

Dimensions
- Wheelbase: 2,750 mm (108.3 in)
- Length: 4,610 mm (181.5 in); 4,505 mm (177.4 in) (Japan); 4,554 mm (179.3 in) (JDM S)
- Width: 1,755 mm (69.1 in)
- Height: 1,631 mm (64.2 in); 1,665 mm (65.6 in) (Japan/Europe)
- Curb weight: 1,470–1,610 kg (3,241–3,549 lb)

=== Initial release ===
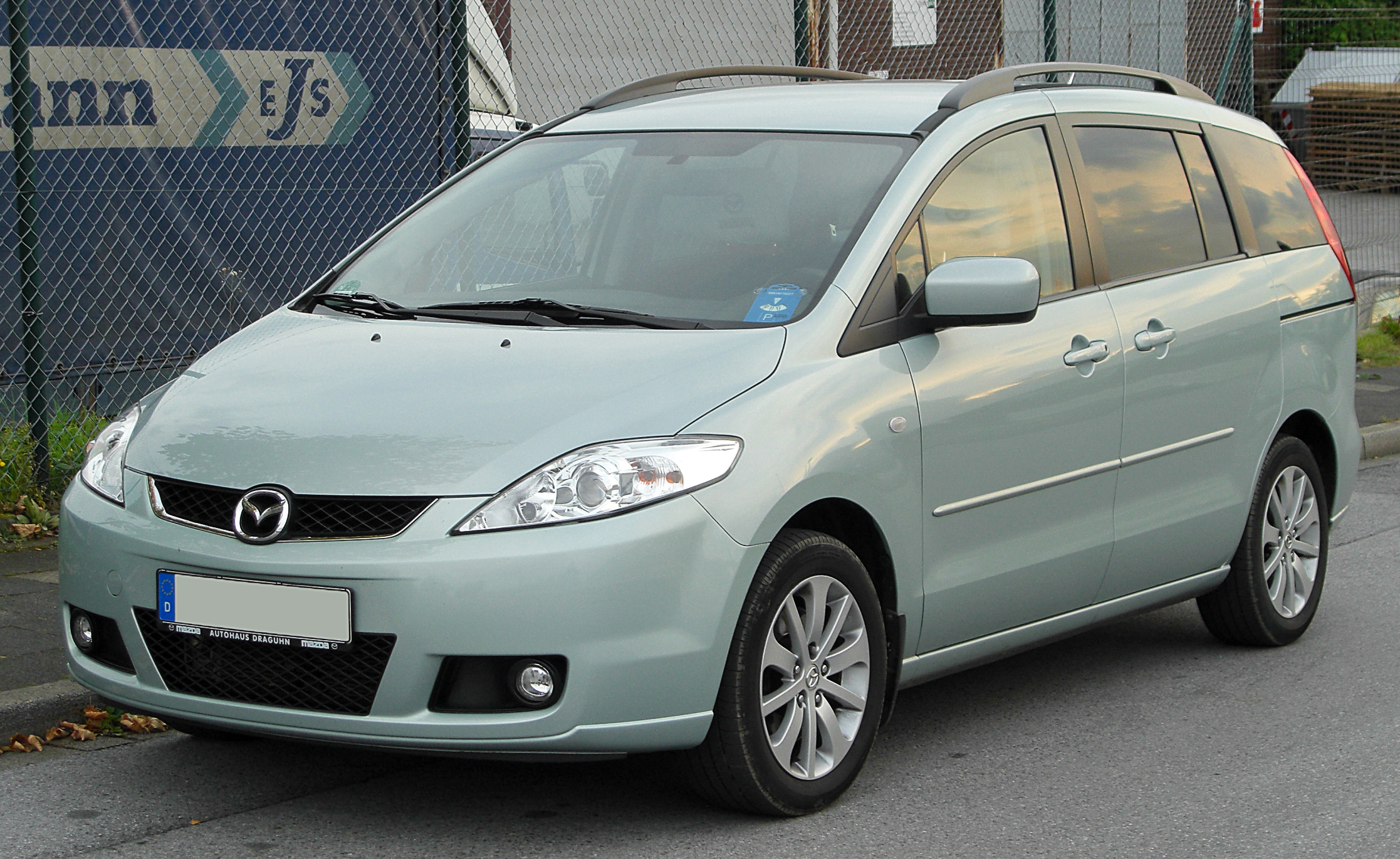

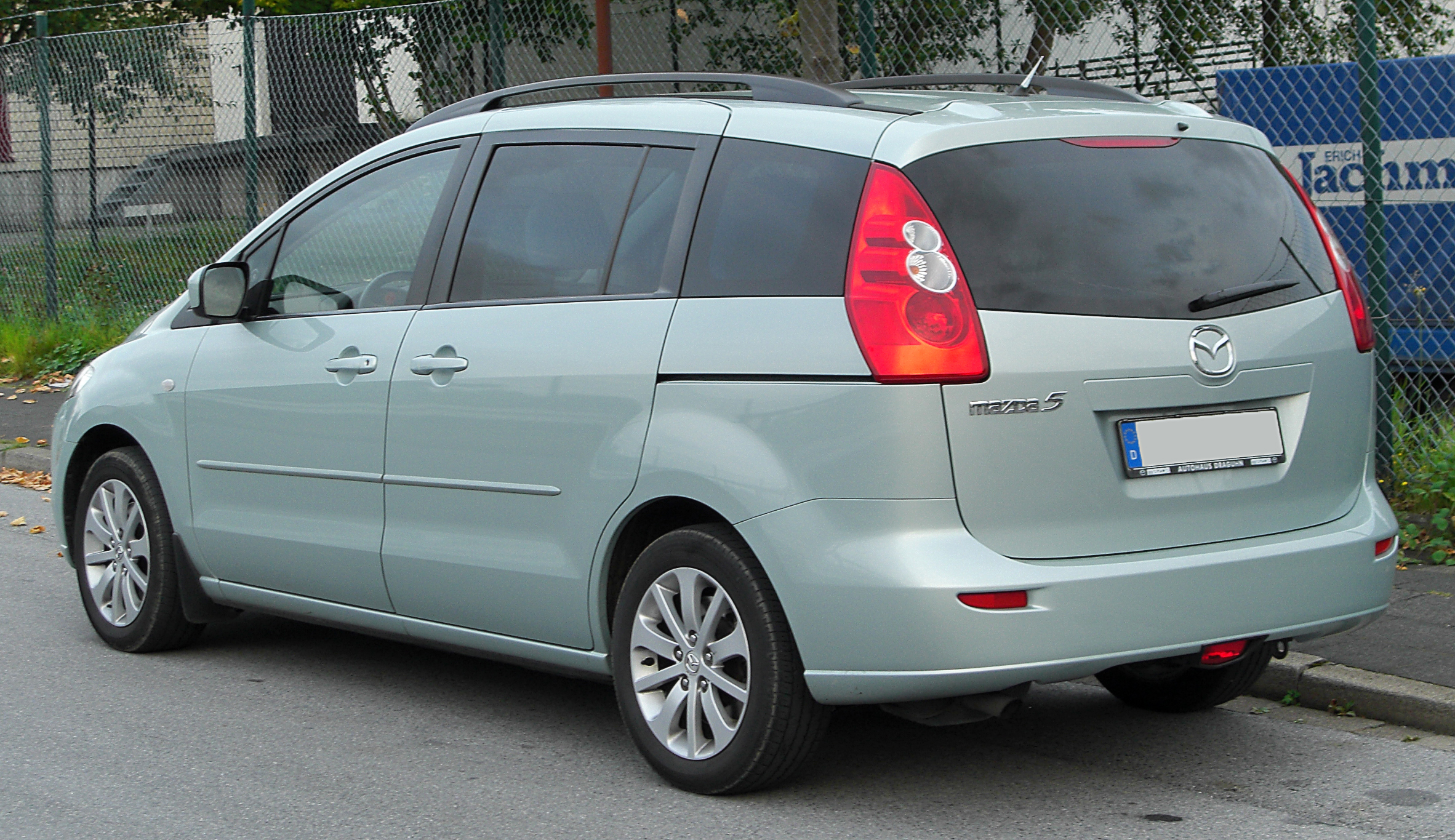
Pre-facelift (European version)

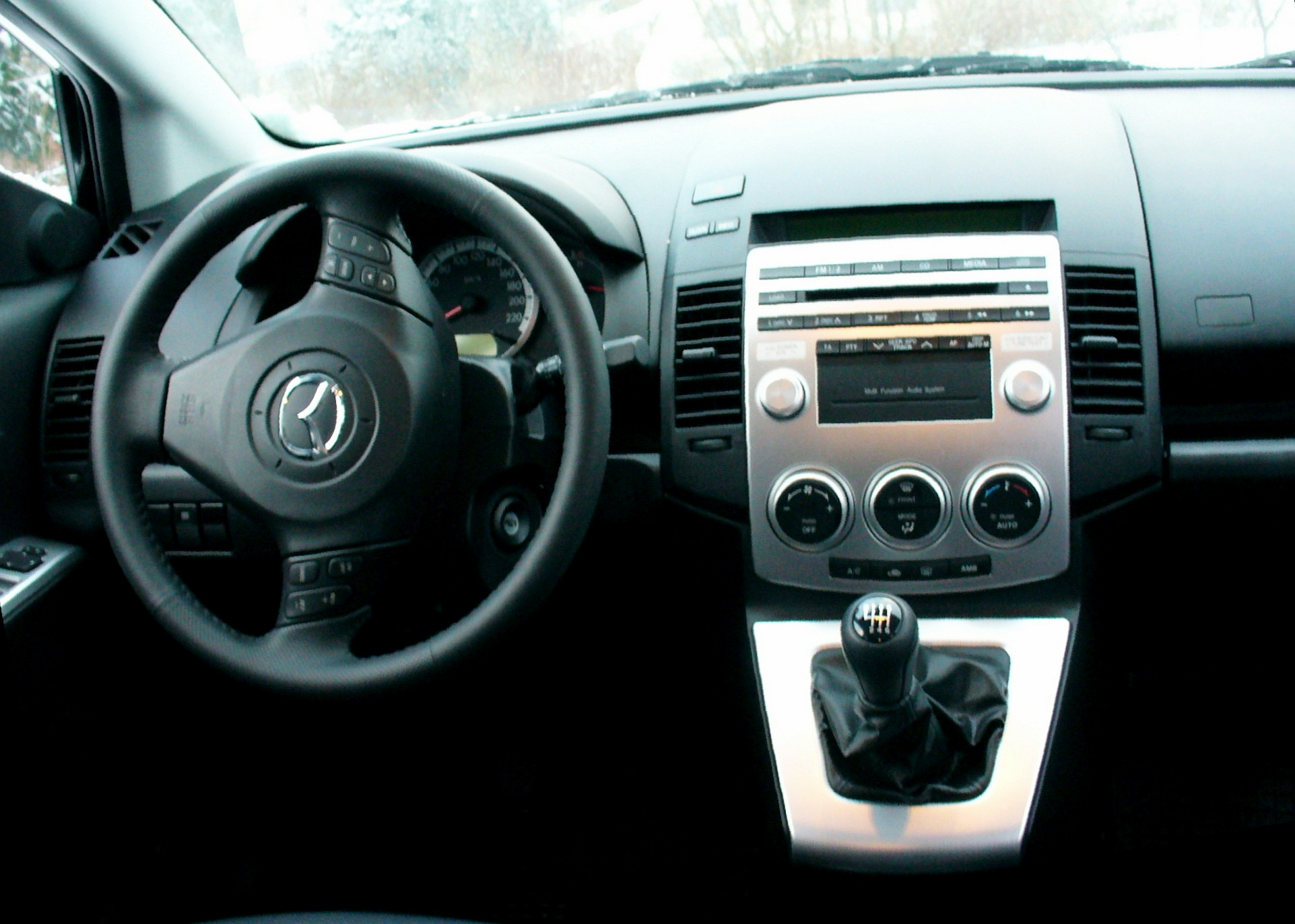
Interior

The second generation went on sale on 7 February 2005 in Japan and mid-2005 in export markets and was bigger than the first generation in all aspects. It was now sold as the Mazda5 in all markets except Japan. While classified by Mazda as a mid-sized wagon, it competes with other vehicles classed as Compact MPVs in Europe, and is viewed as a mini-minivan in the United States. It is based on Ford's global C1 platform, meaning it shares many parts with the Mazda3. The Mazda5 replaced the Mazda MPV as Mazda's minivan offering in most export markets.

The Mazda5 was rebranded in Asia as the Ford I-Max. This version of the vehicle was also introduced for sale in the United States, making it the first compact minivan in that market since the 1994 Mitsubishi Expo (in the United States) and 1995 Nissan Axxess (in Canada). The Mazda5 is marginally larger than the 1984–1989 Toyota Van. Competition joined the North American minivan market in 2006 with Mercedes-Benz's B200 (in Canada and Mexico) and in 2007 with the Kia Rondo (in the United States and Canada).

In North America, due to safety regulations, the Mazda5 fits six passengers using three rows of seats, with two seats per row. Elsewhere, it is sold as a seven-seater using Mazda's "Karakuri Seating System", which means the car has three rows of two seats, with the seventh seat a fold away jump seat in the centre of the middle row. The Mazda5 has three-point seat belts on all seven seats.

The middle row of seats recline and slide front-to-rear, and fold flat. The rear row also folds flat.

The car was previewed as Mazda MX-FLEXA concept at 2004 Geneva Motor Show and officially unveiled at 2004 Paris Motor Show.

==== Specifications ====
The wheelbase is 2,750 mm (108 in) with an overall length of 4,610 mm (181 in). For the Japanese domestic market it is C model/F model – 4,505 mm (177.4 in) / S model – 4,565 mm (179.7 in).

Engine options:

- 1.8 L MZR I4, 85 kW (116 PS/114 hp)
- 2.0 L MZR I4, 110 kW (150 PS/148 hp)
- 2.3 L MZR I4, 117 or 119 kW (159–162 PS/157-159 hp)
- 2.0 L MZR-CD I4 Diesel, 89 or 105 kW (105–143 PS/103-141 hp)

==== Recall ====
Mazda was forced to recall the Mazda5 in the United States shortly after production began due to a risk of exhaust system fires. Owners that were not made aware of the manual shifting mode ("sport mode") of the 4-speed automatic transmission would mistakenly leave the shifter in that position, resulting in high temperatures as the car would remain in second gear. Mazda's solution was to add a heat shield around the muffler and to alter the vehicle's software to not allow excessively high engine speeds beyond a short period of time when in "sport mode". Although the five-speed manual transmission equipped cars would seemingly not need to be recalled, Mazda chose to retrofit all Mazda5 versions with the new parts and software. The company also gave customers US$500 (for Canadian owners, it is C$500) plus a loaner car while the problem was mitigated. 2,700 vehicles were affected.

=== 2006 model year update ===
For the 2006 model year, Mazda offered fewer Mazda5 options than in other markets. The North American version lacked the front-to-back roof rails that were included as standard in other markets. Other notable Mazda5 options not offered in North America included a back-up camera, power-assist side doors and even a choice of engine (2.3 L only). A second-row DVD entertainment system was eventually offered as a dealer installed add-on. Mazda produced a limited number of Mazda5 units featuring all-wheel-drive but this version was not made available outside Japan for the 2006 model year.

==== Mazda Premacy Hydrogen RE Hybrid (2007) ====
The Premacy Hydrogen RE Hybrid was a version of Mazda Premacy with a two-rotor Wankel engine supporting hydrogen or gasoline fuel. The hydrogen tank with 110 L (24 imp gal; 29 US gal) at 350 bars (35,000 kPa) stores up to 2.4 kg (5.3 lb) of hydrogen and is in addition to the 60 L (13 imp gal; 16 US gal) gasoline tank.

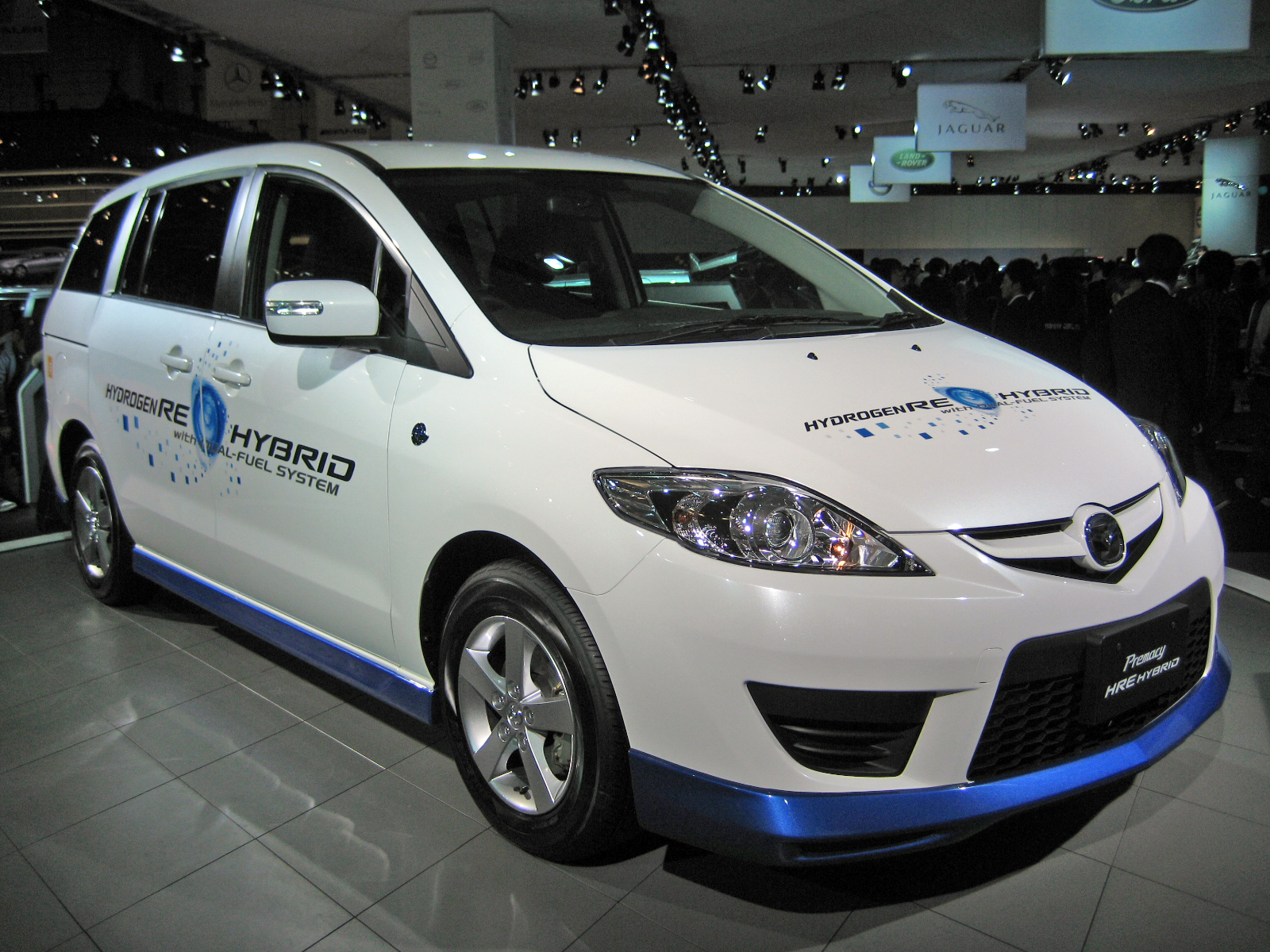
2007 Premacy Hydrogen RE Hybrid

==== Awards ====
The Mazda5 was named "Best New Multipurpose Family Vehicle" in the 2006 Canadian Car of the Year awards. Consumer Reports ranked the Mazda5 as the best "tall wagon" in their test, though the car failed to gain a "recommended" rating due to unknown reliability.

In April 2006, the Japan New Car Assessment Program (J-NCAP) awarded the Mazda5 a maximum six-star rating for front-occupant crash worthiness. In Europe, the Mazda5 was awarded a maximum five-star "adult occupant" safety rating in September 2005 by the Euro-NCAP.

=== 2008 update ===
For 2008, the Mazda Premacy/Mazda5 received a mid-cycle refresh with updated front bumper, wheels and rear LED lights for Touring and Grand Touring trim levels. The automatic gearbox was updated to five-speed. The interior received a few changes to the dash including luminescent gauges, an updated radio control layout with auxiliary input, a rear A/C vent, center console, and a full set of armrests for the first and second seating rows on North American models. Mazda first released the 2008 Mazda Premacy in Japan, with other markets to follow.

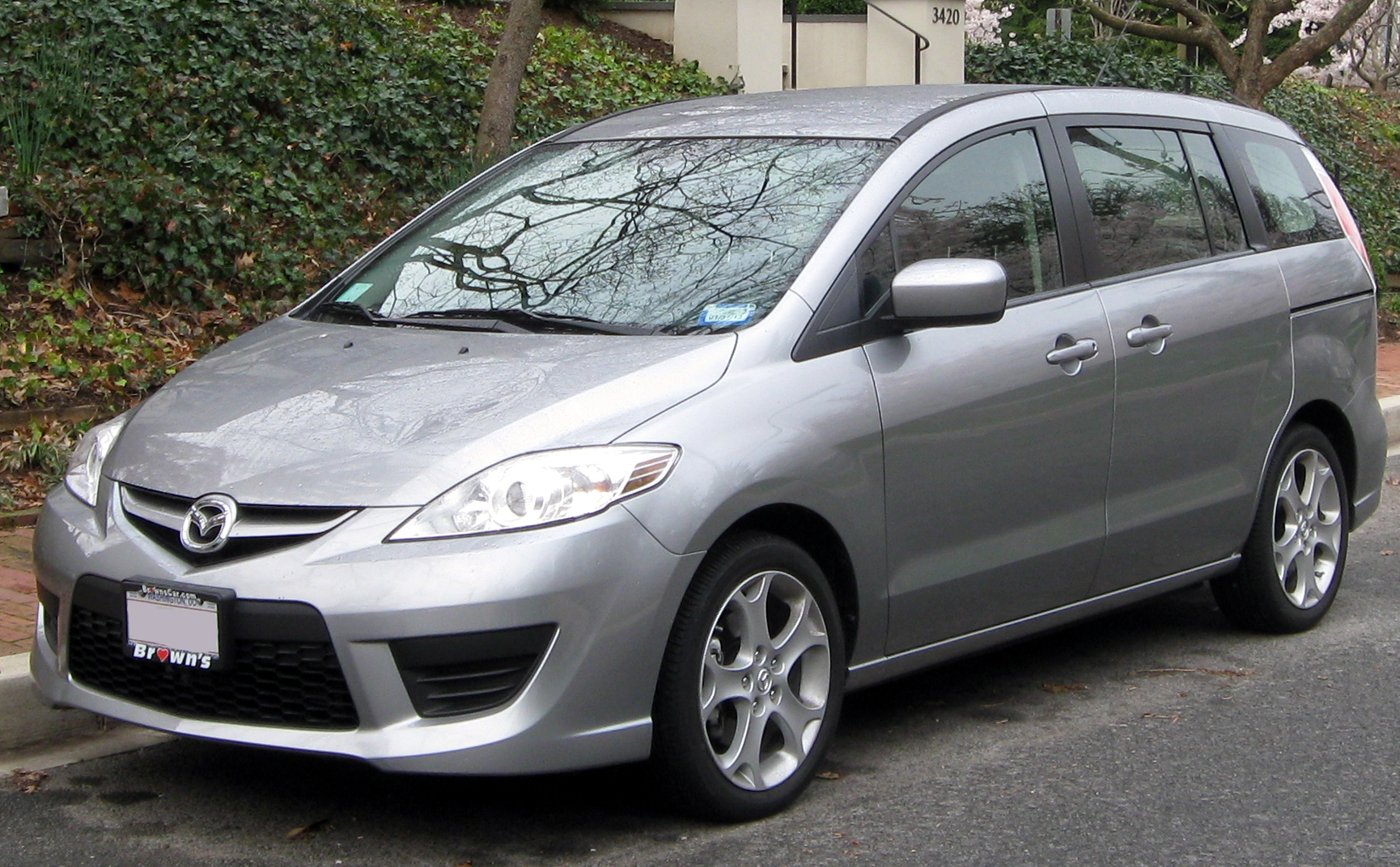
2008 facelift (North American version)

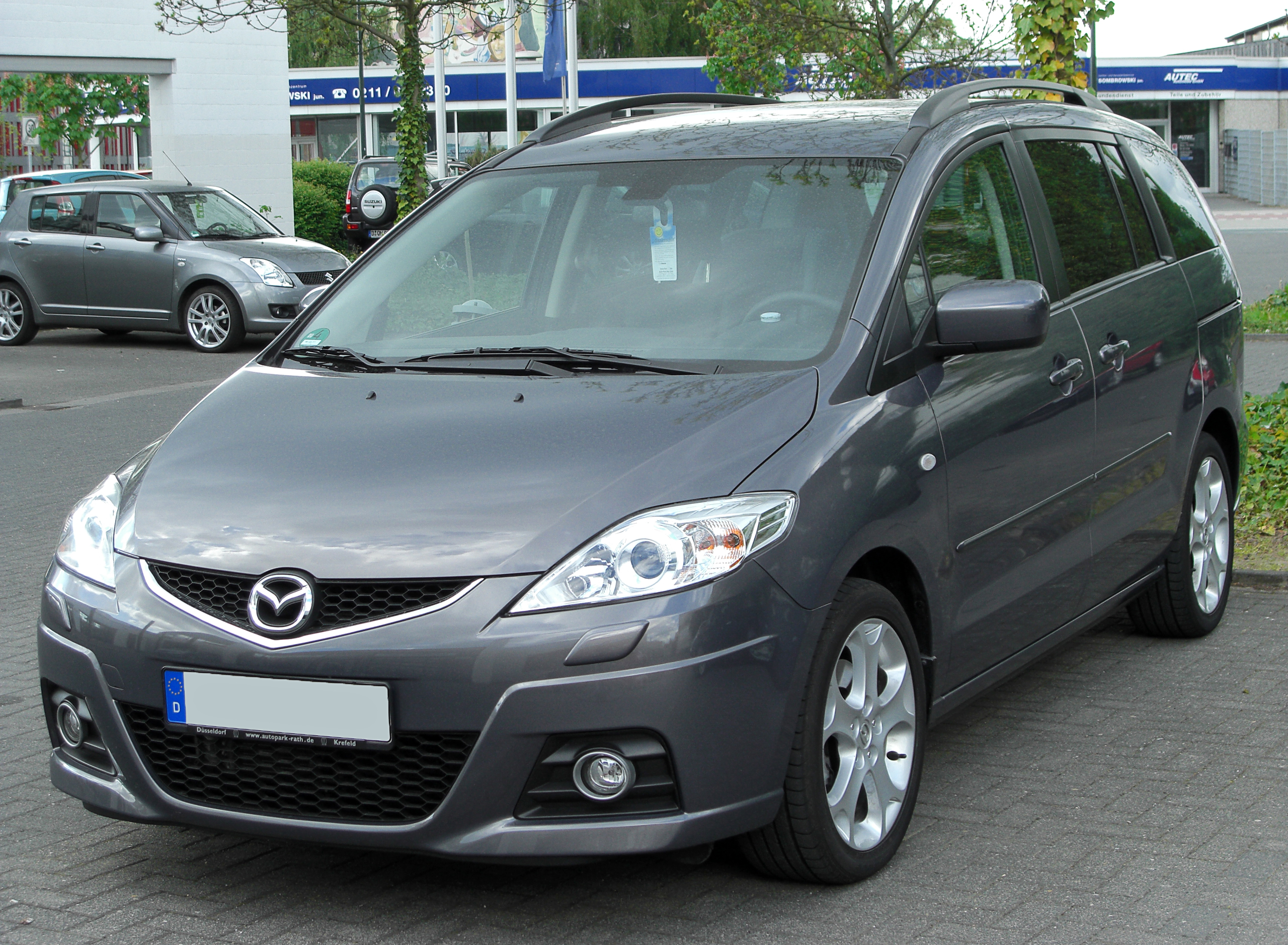
2008 facelift (European version)

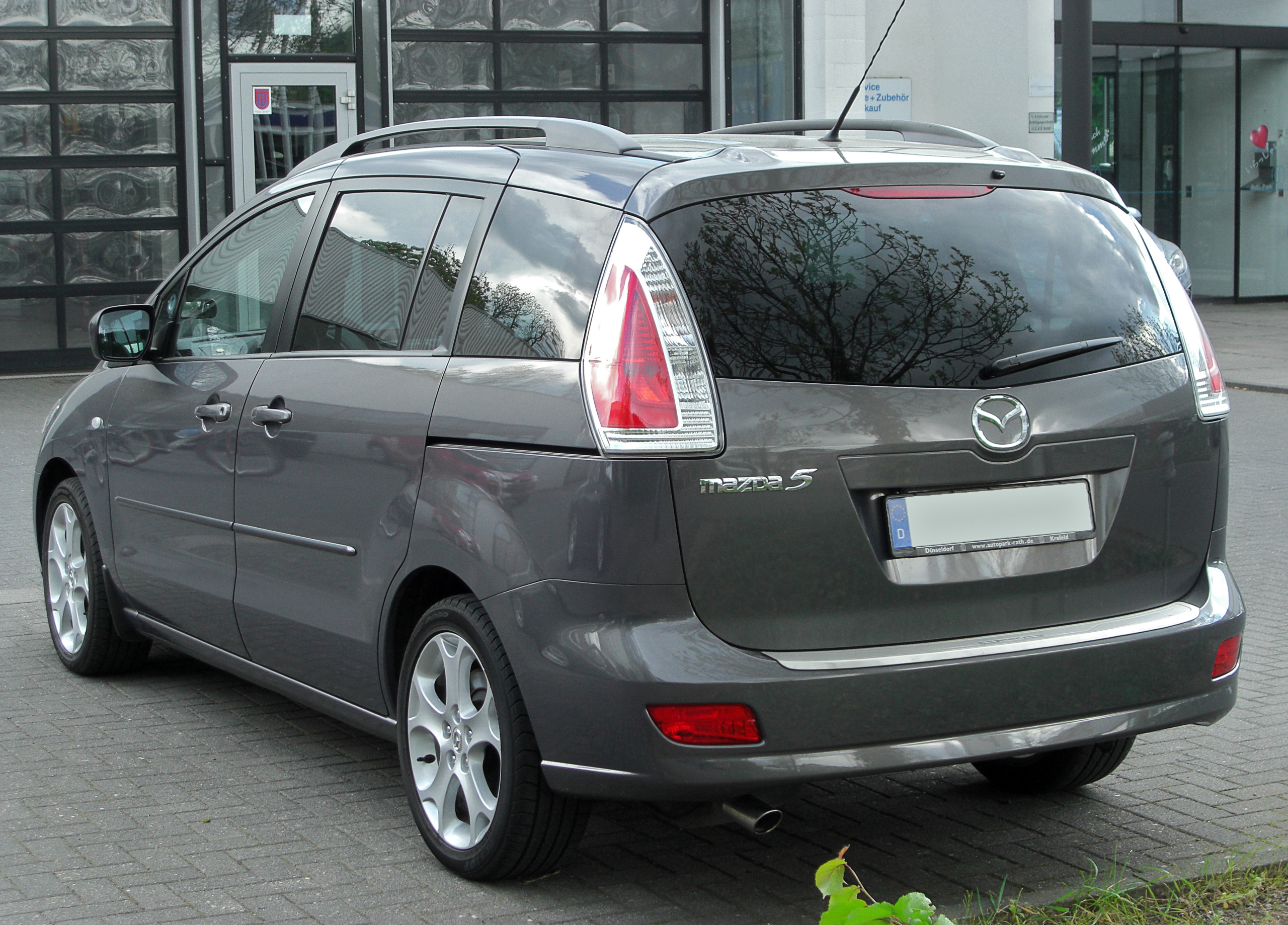
2008 facelift (European version)

=== 2010 update ===
For 2010, Mazda added electronic stability control and traction control to the Mazda5, safety features that were formerly cited as oversights on the vehicle.

=== Ford i-Max ===
The Ford i-Max was developed by Ford Lio Ho in Taiwan to replace the Ford Ixion MAV that had been discontinued in 2005. Ford Lio Ho applied Ford's "Kinetic design" design language with styling changes including a redesigned front end, horizontal tail lamps, and the addition of Ford S-MAX inspired side air-vents.

The Ford i-Max is powered by Duratec-HE 2.0 liter inline-4 gasoline engine producing 148 hp/6000rpm and 19.2kgm/4500rpm mated to a sequential sport shift 4-speed automatic gearbox. The i-Max debuted in July 2007. There are four trim levels including the 5-seater GLX, 7-seater Ghia, the 7-seater Ghia-X, and the 6-seater Ghia-Limited.

A facelift was introduced in 2010 featuring an additional rear fog lamp, smoked headlamps, and red tail lamp lens.

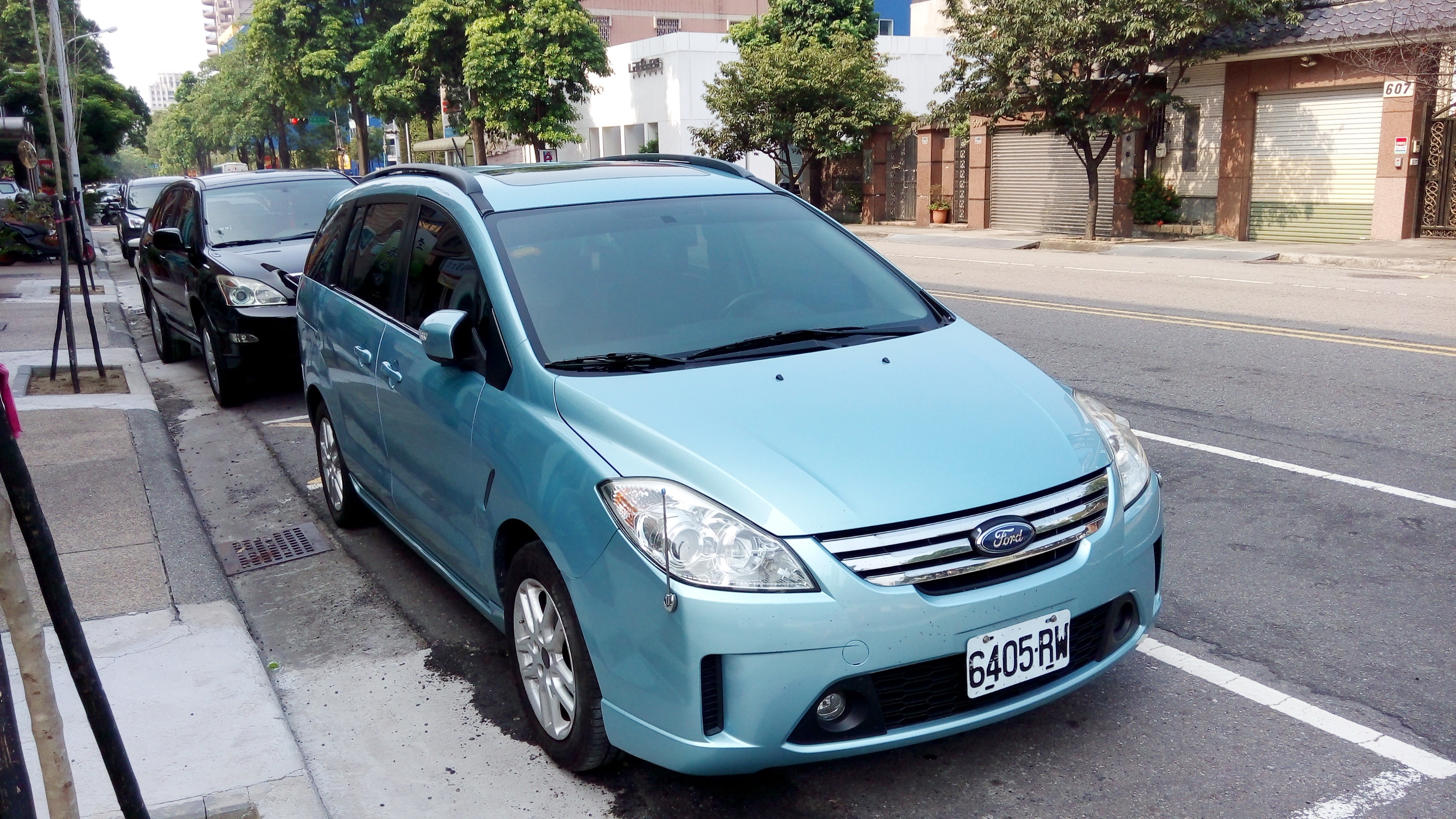
Ford i-Max front

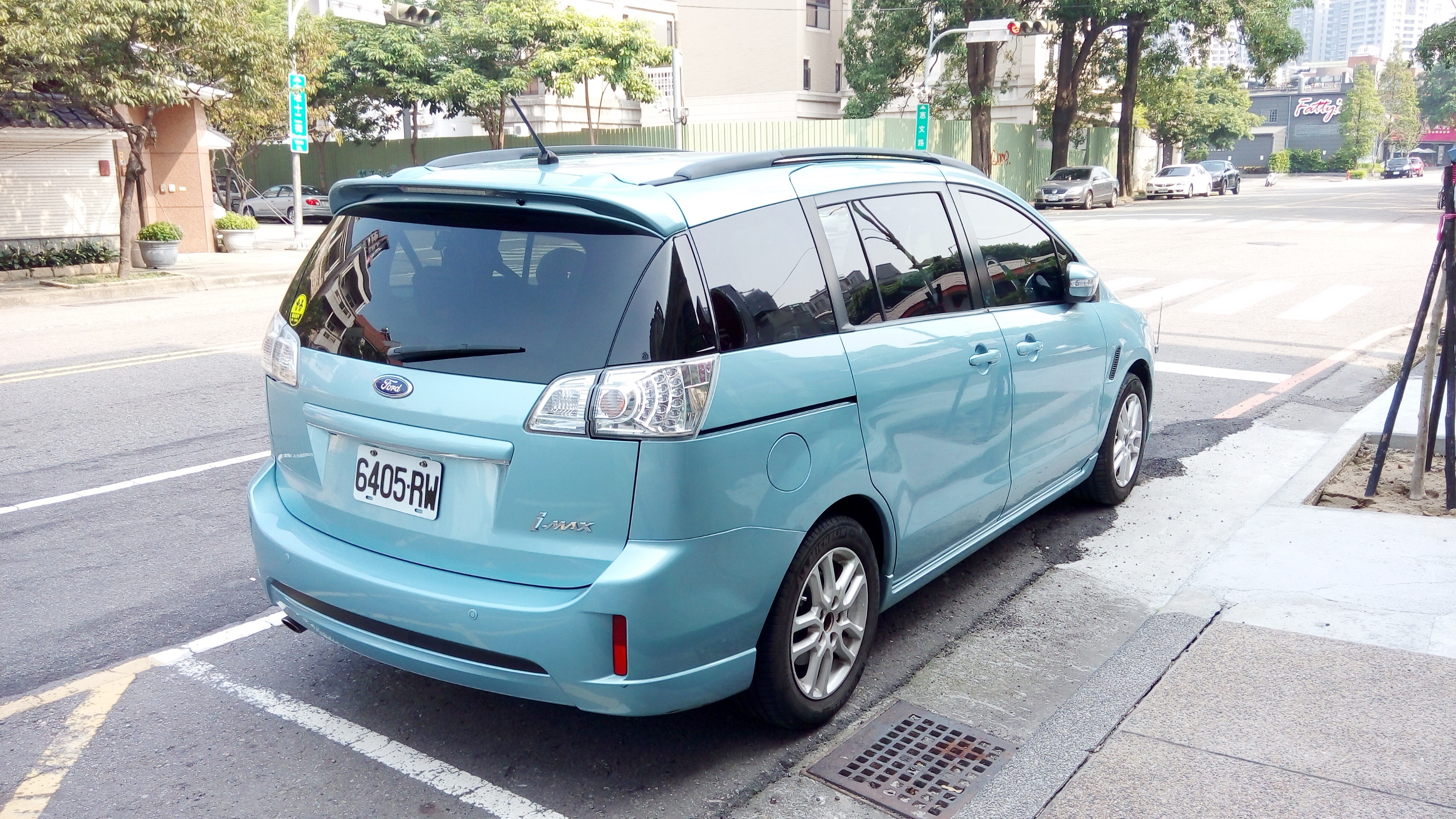
Ford i-Max rear

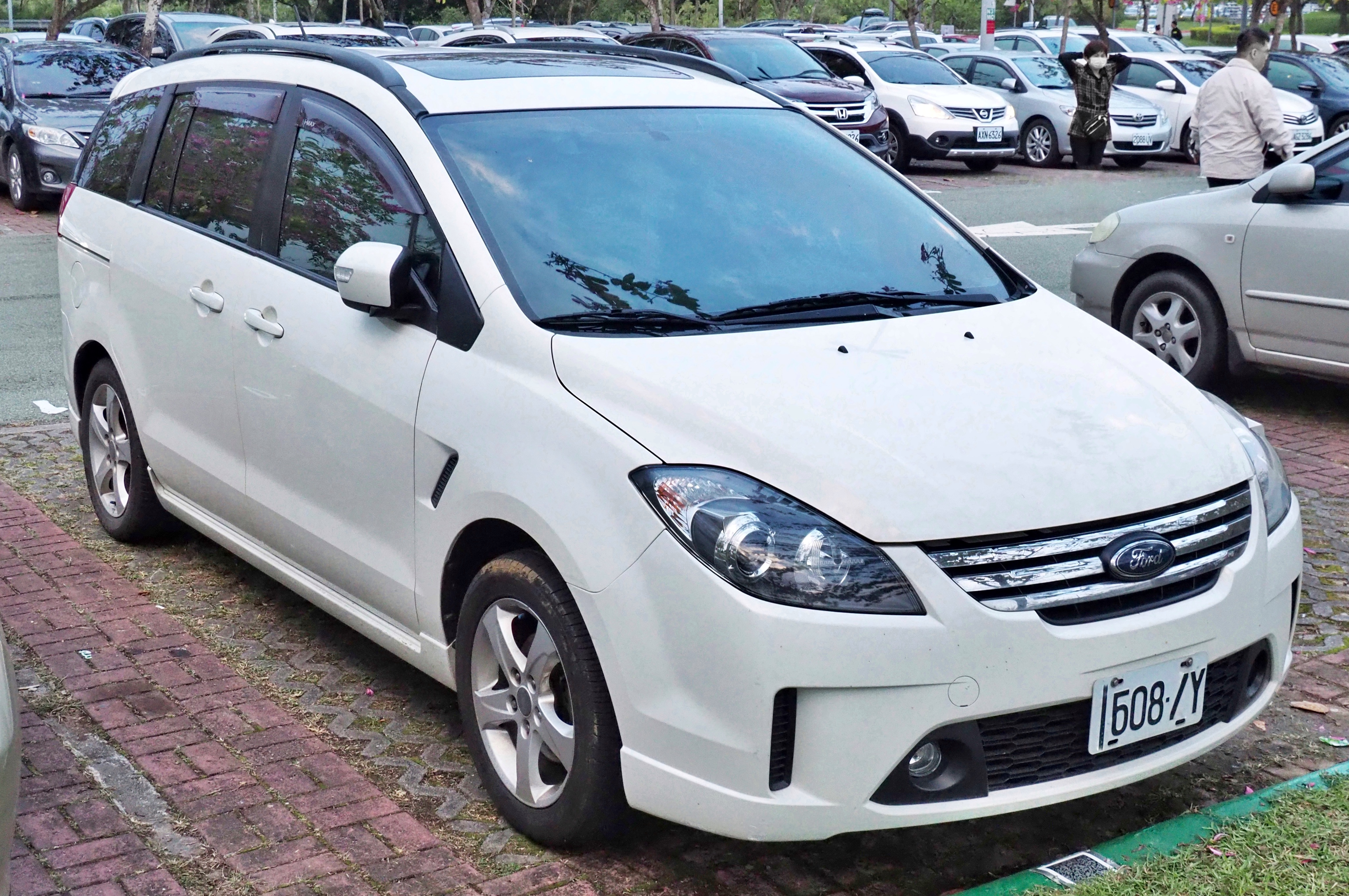
2007 Ford i-Max

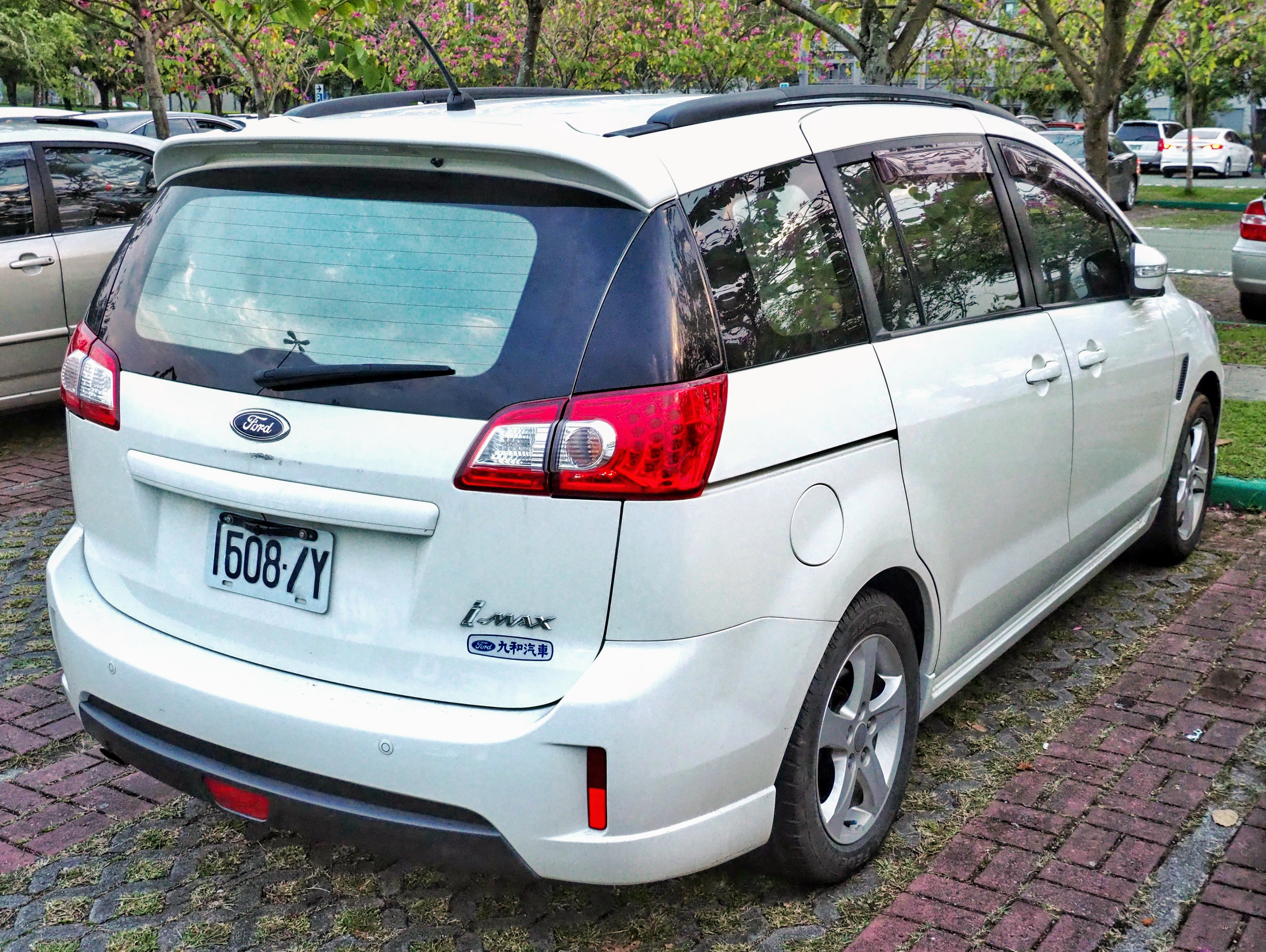
2007 Ford i-Max

== Third generation (CW; 2010) ==
Third generation
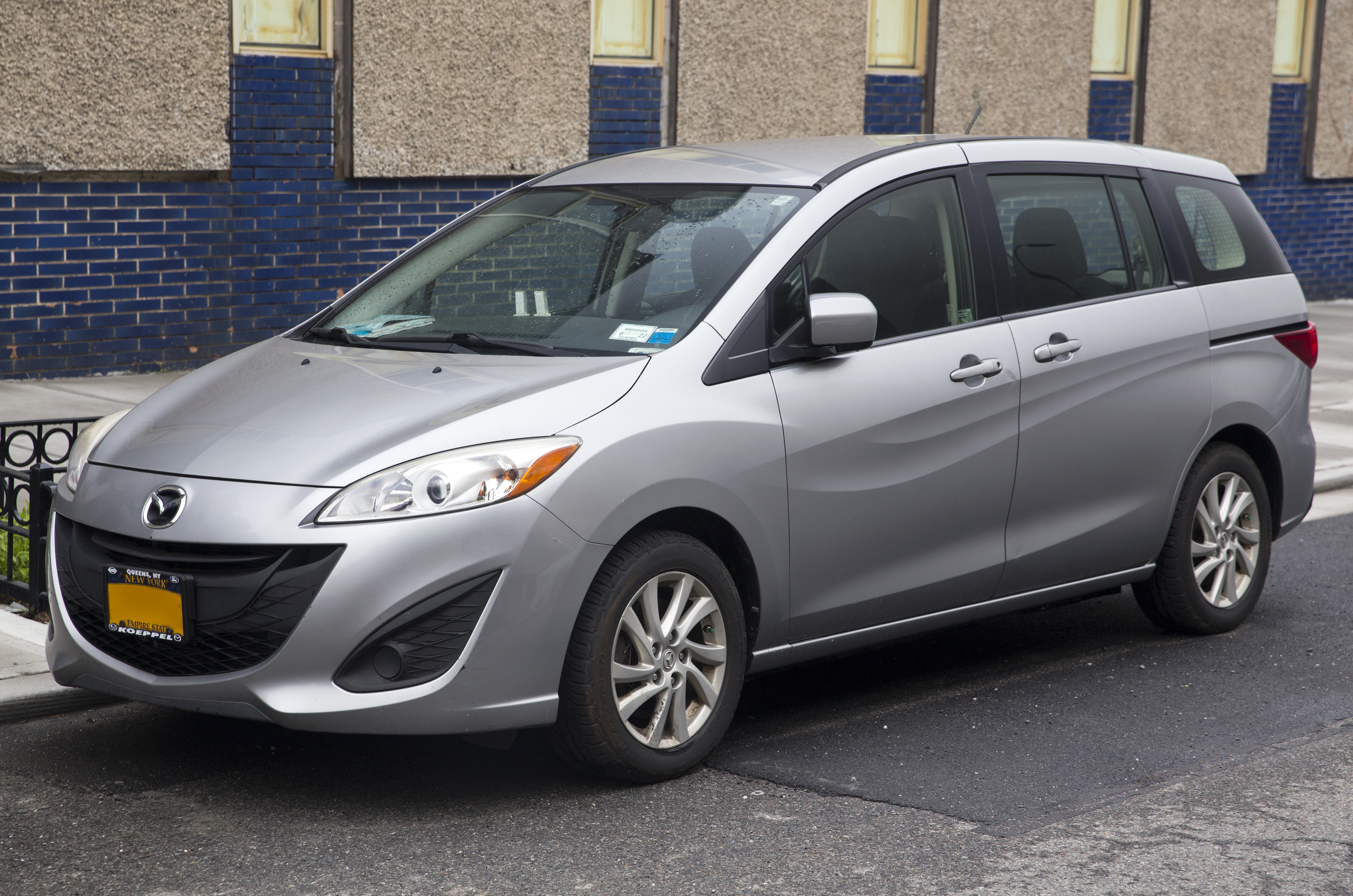
- 2012 Mazda5 Sport (pre-facelift)

Overview
- Model code: CW
- Also called: Mazda5; Nissan Lafesta Highway Star
- Production: July 2010 – March 2018
- Assembly: Japan: Hiroshima (Hiroshima Plant); Taiwan: Zhongli (Ford Lio Ho)

Body and chassis
- Body style: 5-door minivan
- Layout: Front-engine, front-wheel-drive; Front-engine, all-wheel-drive
- Related: Mazda3

Powertrain
- Engine: 1.8 L MZR L8-DE I4; 2.0 L MZR LF-VD I4; 2.0 L MZR LF-VDS I4; 2.0 L MZR LF-VE I4 (AWD); 2.0 L Skyactiv-G (PE-VPS) I4; 2.5 L MZR L5-VE I4; 1.6 L MZ-CD diesel I4
- Transmission: 6-speed manual; 4-speed automatic (AWD); 5-speed automatic; 6-speed Skyactiv-Drive automatic

Dimensions
- Wheelbase: 2,751 mm (108.3 in)
- Length: 4,585 mm (180.5 in)
- Width: 1,750 mm (68.9 in)
- Height: 1,615 mm (63.6 in)
- Curb weight: 1,470–1,568 kg (3,241–3,457 lb)

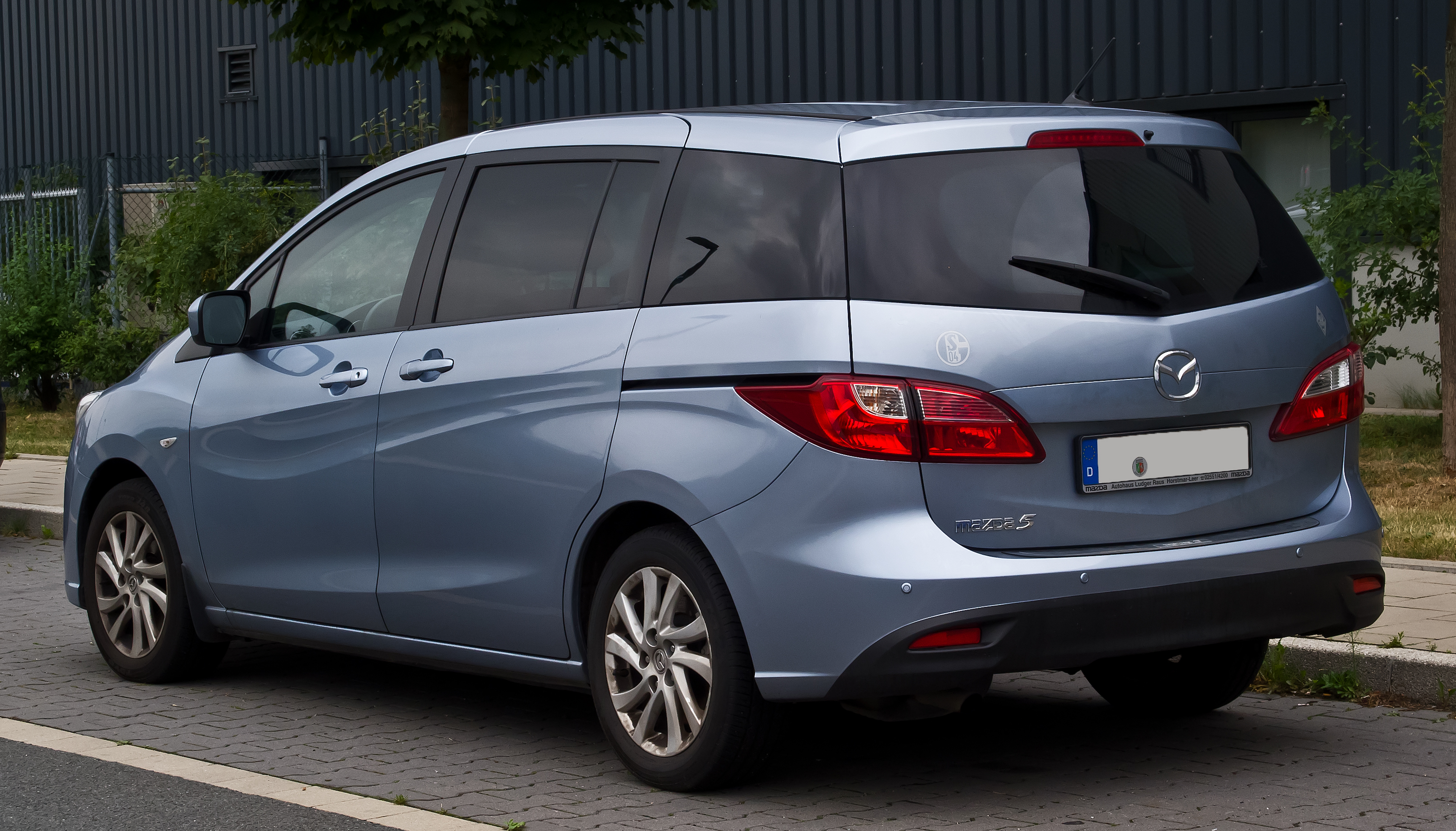
Mazda5 (rear view)

The third generation was the first car to use Mazda's new Nagare design language, with the curve of the front fender flowing past the wheel well and onto the car's flank. "Nagare" means flow and was first developed for the eponymous show car of 2006.

In Europe, the third generation Mazda5 was offered with a 1.6-liter turbo-diesel, a 1.8-liter four-cylinder or a 2.0-liter four-cylinder gasoline engine with direct-injection and Mazda's i-stop start/stop technology, which will reduce emissions by 15 percent. All engines include a six-speed manual transmission as standard, as well as new environmental friendly features.

For 2012, the US Mazda5 was offered with a 157 hp (117 kW) 2.5-liter four-cylinder engine. A six-speed manual transmission is standard in the base model, with a five-speed automatic optional while both the Touring and the Grand Touring come with a five-speed automatic with manual mode. The third generation began production on 13 May 2010 and began sales in Japan on 1 July 2010. The Mazda5 comes in three grades: 20CS, 20E and 20S. The base model CS does not include i-stop.

Taiwanese market models of Mazda5 were produced by Ford Lio Ho Motor Co., Ltd.

In the United States, 2015 was the last Mazda5 model year, as Mazda stopped importing the vehicle due to sluggish sales volumes. Mazda shifted its focus to crossover vehicles growing in popularity. The Mazda5 was also discontinued of European market in the same year. However, the Mazda5 continued to be sold in Canada for the 2016 and 2017 model years.

=== 2013 update ===
Changes to Mazda Premacy include the introduction of Skyactiv-G 2.0L engine and 6-speed Skyactiv-Drive automatic transmission. The Skyactiv variant of the Premacy has a fuel economy of 16.2 km/L (45.8 mpg_{‑imp}; 38.1 mpg_{‑US}) based on Japan's JC08 mode.

Japanese market models went on sale in January 2013. Early models include 20C-Skyactiv, 20S-Skyactiv, 20S-Skyactiv L-package, 20CS, 20C, 20S.

Mazda announced the discontinuation of the Mazda Premacy in 2018. There will be no direct successor to the Mazda Premacy/Mazda5 as the company pulled out of the minivan market entirely, to focus on SUVs and cars.

=== Nissan Lafesta Highway Star ===
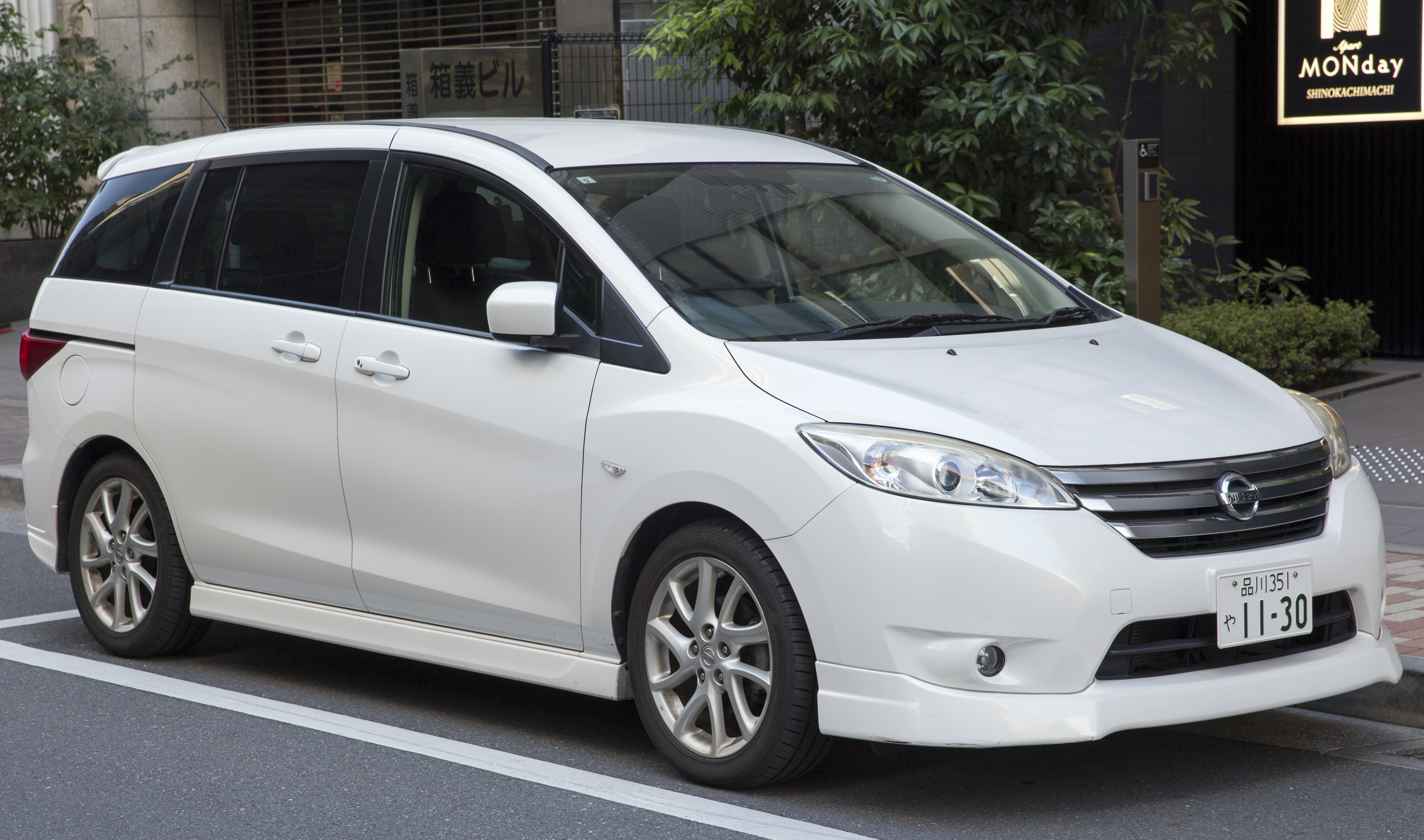
Nissan Lafesta Highway Star (Japan)

The Nissan Lafesta Highway Star is a rebranded version of the Premacy supplied to Nissan on an original equipment manufacturer (OEM) basis. It features a restyled front end. Unlike the Premacy, the new Nissan Lafesta Highway Star had flatter door panels.

Only sold in Japan, the Lafesta Highway Star went on sale on 15 June 2011.

== Discontinuation ==
Sales of the Premacy ended on 23 February 2018 in Japan alongside the Biante.
