= Five (ballet) =

Five is a ballet made by Jean-Pierre Bonnefoux for New York City Ballet's American Music Festival to eponymous music by Charles Wuorinen commissioned for the occasion. The premiere took place on 28 April 1988 at the New York State Theater, Lincoln Center.

== Original cast ==
- Maria Calegari
- Jock Soto
- Michael Byars
- Damian Woetzel

== Reviews ==
- "Dance; A Ballet by Bonnefoux With a Wuorinen Score", Anna Kisselgoff, April 30, 1988 NY Times

== Articles ==
- May 22, 1988 Anna Kisselgoff, NY Times
- January 3, 1996 Allan Kozinn, NY Times
