= Central Park Five (disambiguation) =

The Central Park Five are the defendants in the 1989 Central Park jogger case.

Central Park Five may also refer to:

- The Central Park Five (film), a 2012 film about the case
- The Central Park Five (opera), a 2019 opera about the case
- The Central Park Five (miniseries), a 2019 TV series about the case, retitled When They See Us
