= Five (magazine) =

Defunct German-language basketball magazine (2003–2021)

- Editor-in-chief: André Voigt
- Categories: Basketball magazine
- Frequency: Ten times a year
- Publisher: Park and Ride Sports GMBH
- Founder: André Voigt; Jan Hieronimi
- Founded: 2003
- First issue: August 2003
- Final issue: 2021
- Country: Germany
- Based in: Munich
- Language: German-language

Five was a German-language basketball magazine. Its subtitle was Basketball for Life!. It was in circulation between 2003 and 2021.

== History and profile ==
Five was first published in August 2003. The founders were André Voigt and Jan Hieronimi. As of 2008 André Voigt was also the editor-in-chief of Five. The magazine was published ten times a year by Park and Ride Sports GMBH in Munich. Its former headquarters was in Cologne. It reported news about NBA through its permanent staff in Portland. From 2007 the magazine published a supplement, Fünf, which featured articles about the German Basketball Bundesliga. Five ceased publication in September 2021.
