= Alexandre Gama (entrepreneur) =

Brazilian entrepreneur

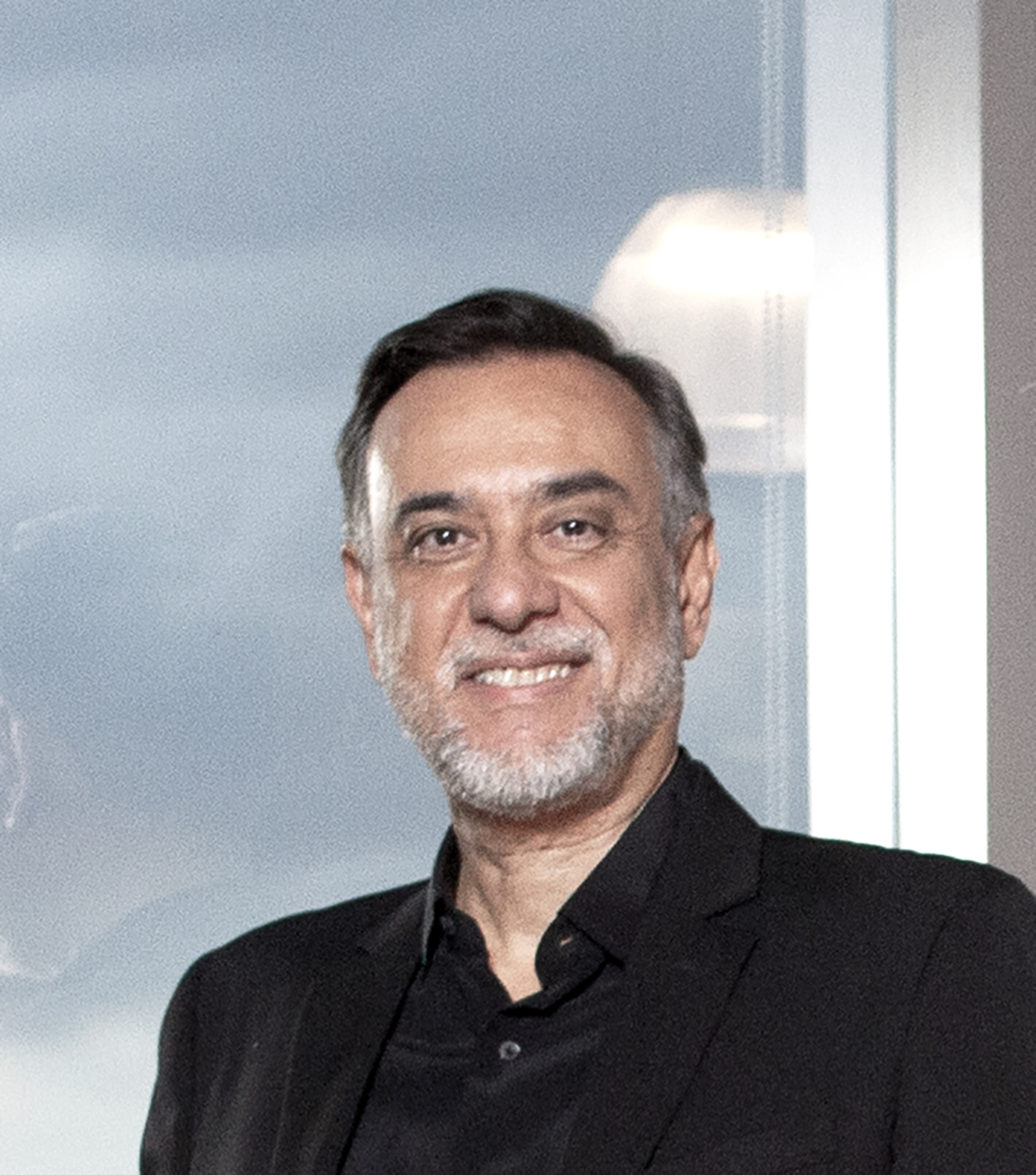
- Born: June 1, 1958 (age 68); Rio de Janeiro, Brazil
- Occupations: Entrepreneur, Founder, CEO of INOVNATION

Alexandre Gama (born June 1, 1958 in Rio de Janeiro) is a Brazilian entrepreneur with creative background operating in diverse fields such as communication, marketing, media, content, design, innovation, startups, music and automobile industry. He is the founder and CEO of INOVNATION, a hub of companies from different areas, all having innovation as their core value. He was the founder, CEO, and CCO of NEOGAMA, one of the most iconic communication agencies.

Gama was the first Brazilian to lead a global network of agencies as global chief creative officer (WCCO) of the British-based agency network, BBH. Gama leading BBH

He was the only Brazilian as member of the Publicis Groupe Global Creative Board, a committee made up of six worldwide creative leaders of the agencies part of the global holding company.

== Career ==
Gama received degree in Advertising and Communications from Armando Alvares Penteado Foundation (FAAP).

His advertising career began in 1982 at Standard Ogilvy & Mather, where he worked as a creative and copywriter.

In 1990, he moved on to DM9 as a Copywriter and Creative Director where he worked for 4 years – a period during which he was the most awarded creative copywriter of his generation in Brazil. Gama also worked at agencies such as Almap BBDO as a shareholder and Creative Executive VP, and Young & Rubicam as CEO (the youngest ever taking the position at that time), CCO and Member of the Global Board in 1996.

Gama left Young & Rubicam in 1999 to start his own agency, NEOGAMA.

In 2008, he was the first Latin American to present a Master Class at the Cannes Festival in France.

In 2012, he became a board member of ABAP – Brazilian Association of Advertising Agencies and was responsible for supporting and promoting the best practices of the Brazilian communications industry.

Abroad, Gama acted as Foreman for the International Film Jury of the British foundation D&AD in 2004, when he was the first Latin American to lead the global award judging for advertising professionals. He was also a Jury Member at the same festival in 2008 and a Foreman again in 2013.

In addition to his activities as a communications and advertising man, Gama is also involved with the music industry. In 2014, he officially founded and launched VIOLAB, a Brazilian acoustic guitar instrumental music project that includes a recording studio, a recording label, a radio program and a YouTube channel that promotes the music of the best acoustic guitar Brazilian players and musicians.

Gama was invited in 2014 to show his work at the Brazilian Art Museum (MAB), in an applied art exhibition called Ideia e Forma – Alexandre Gama, the first and only exhibit of this kind ever performed in Brazil so far. The exhibition was part of the official calendar of cultural events of São Paulo, remaining open for the general public for two months.

In 2014, he also became a shareholder and investor in the British car company Briggs Automotive Company (BAC). Situated in Liverpool, the company manufactures high-end sports cars.

By 2016, Gama had won 23 Lions from Cannes Festival and played the role of Jury Member in the Film and Press of the festival three times.

In 2016, Gama was invited to be a member of the Global Creative Board, a Publicis Groupe committee made up of the six worldwide agency leaders responsible for creative strategy and planning of innovation and new initiatives in the creative industry for the holding company. Gama is the only Brazilian in the group.

== NEOGAMA ==
NEOGAMA was founded in 1999 by Gama and was the fastest-growing agency in Brazil in its first three years of operation. NEOGAMA was also the first agency in Brazil to win a Lion in the Cannes Festival in its first year of existence.

In 2002, Gama associated NEOGAMA with BBH, the London-based agency, creating Neogama/BBH, keeping himself as the major shareholder in the partnership.

Also in 2002, NEOGAMA/BBH was named "Agency of the Year" by Meio e Mensagem newspaper, becoming the youngest agency to ever win the Caboré award.

In 2003, NEOGAMA was the first Brazilian agency to win two Golden Lions in the same year in Cannes two main categories: Press and Film.

In 2012, Publicis Groupe acquired both Neogama and BBH.

In 2016, after completing the earn-out period related to the agency deal, Gama and Neogama left the BBH network and Gama started a new phase focused on the agency in Brazil only, taking back the name Neogama and operating more independently.

== Awards ==
In 2006, Alexandre Gama was nominated as one of the 7 most important professionals in the history of Brazilian advertising by a group of 250 professionals in the national advertising market. The research was coordinated and published by About magazine.

Also in 2006, he was elected "Agency Leader of the Year" at the 10th Professional Contribution Award from the Propaganda Professionals Association (APP).

In 2007, Gama won the Caboré Award by being voted "Entrepreneur of the Year in the Communications Industry".

Also in 2007, he was voted by advertising professionals as one of the top 3 advertising men in Brazil – for his influence and relevance – in a research done by Grupo Consultores – a marketing consulting company based in Europe.

Gama was elected one of the 10 most important leaders of the communications industry by Meio & Mensagem newspaper, in 2009.

In 2013, Gama created the "Rock Giant" campaign about Brazil for Johnnie Walker. The campaign became nationally and internationally famous and won the "Company or the Year" award by Diageo.

In 2015, Gama's agency won a Golden Lion at Cannes for the campaign created for the Mix Brasil Festival for Cultural and Sexual Diversity.
