= Mazda Biante =

Minivan produced by Mazda (2008–2018)

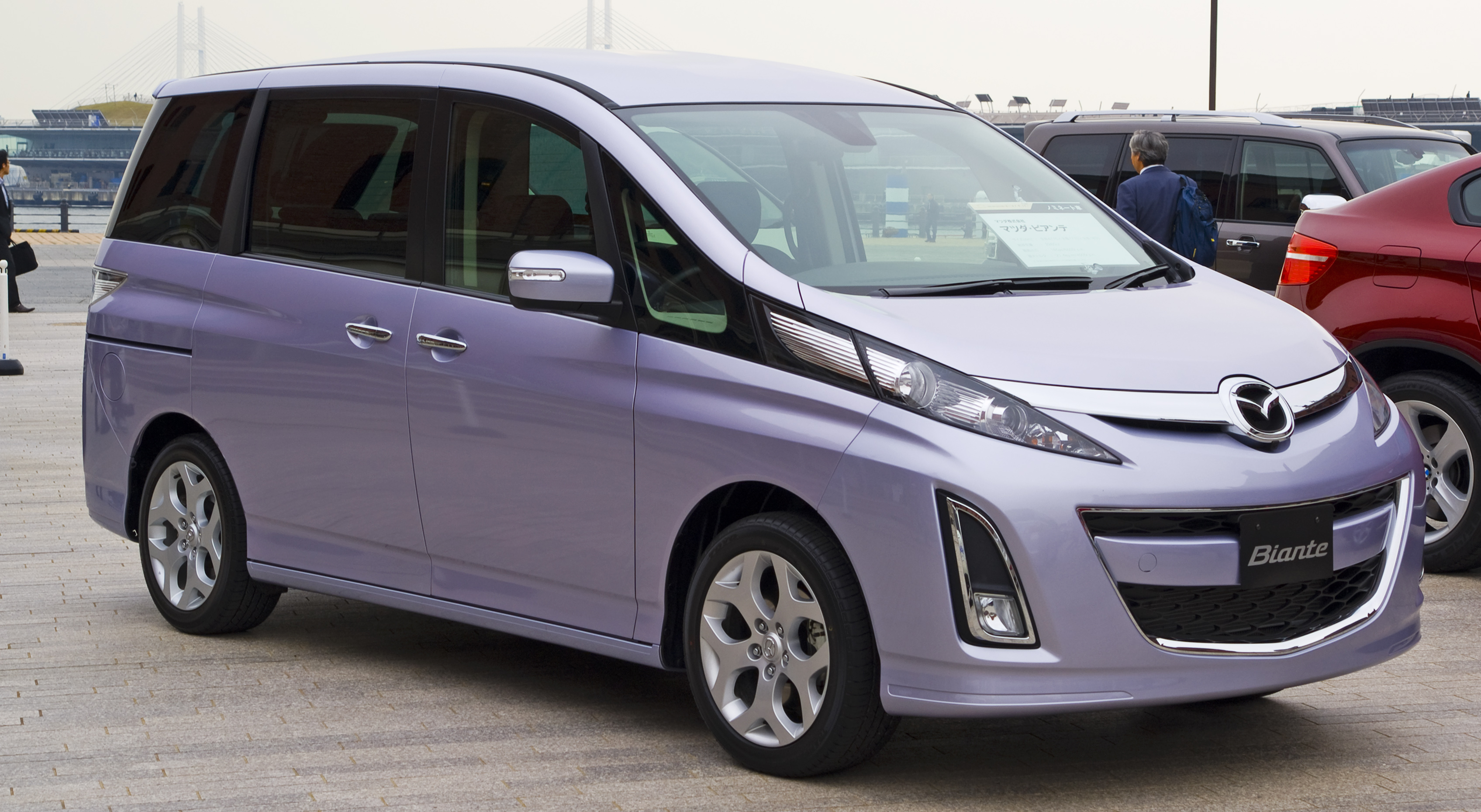

Overview
- Manufacturer: Mazda
- Model code: CC
- Production: 2008–2018
- Assembly: Japan: Hiroshima (Hiroshima Plant)

Body and chassis
- Class: Minivan
- Body style: 5-door van
- Layout: Front-engine, front-wheel-drive; Front-engine, four-wheel-drive
- Related: Mazda5 (CW)

Powertrain
- Engine: 2.0 L MZR LF-VD DOHC I4; 2.0 L Skyactiv-G (PE-VPS) DOHC I4; 2.3 L MZR L3-VE DOHC I4
- Transmission: 4-speed automatic; 5-speed automatic; 6-speed Skyactiv-Drive automatic

Dimensions
- Wheelbase: 2,850 mm (112.2 in)
- Length: 4,715 mm (185.6 in)
- Width: 1,770 mm (69.7 in)
- Height: 1,835–1,855 mm (72.2–73.0 in)
- Curb weight: 1,640–1,770 kg (3,616–3,902 lb)

Chronology
- Predecessor: Mazda Bongo Friendee

The Mazda Biante (Japanese: マツダ・ビアンテ, Hepburn: Matsuda Biante) is an 8-seater minivan introduced for the Japanese market in 2008 by Mazda, replacing the Bongo Friendee. The car fits between the Premacy and MPV in Mazda's range. The Biante is primarily aimed at younger families with small children.

The name ‘Biante’ was coined from the English word, ‘ambient,’ to create the impression of a unified interior space that contributes to a comfortable in-car experience.

== Japan ==
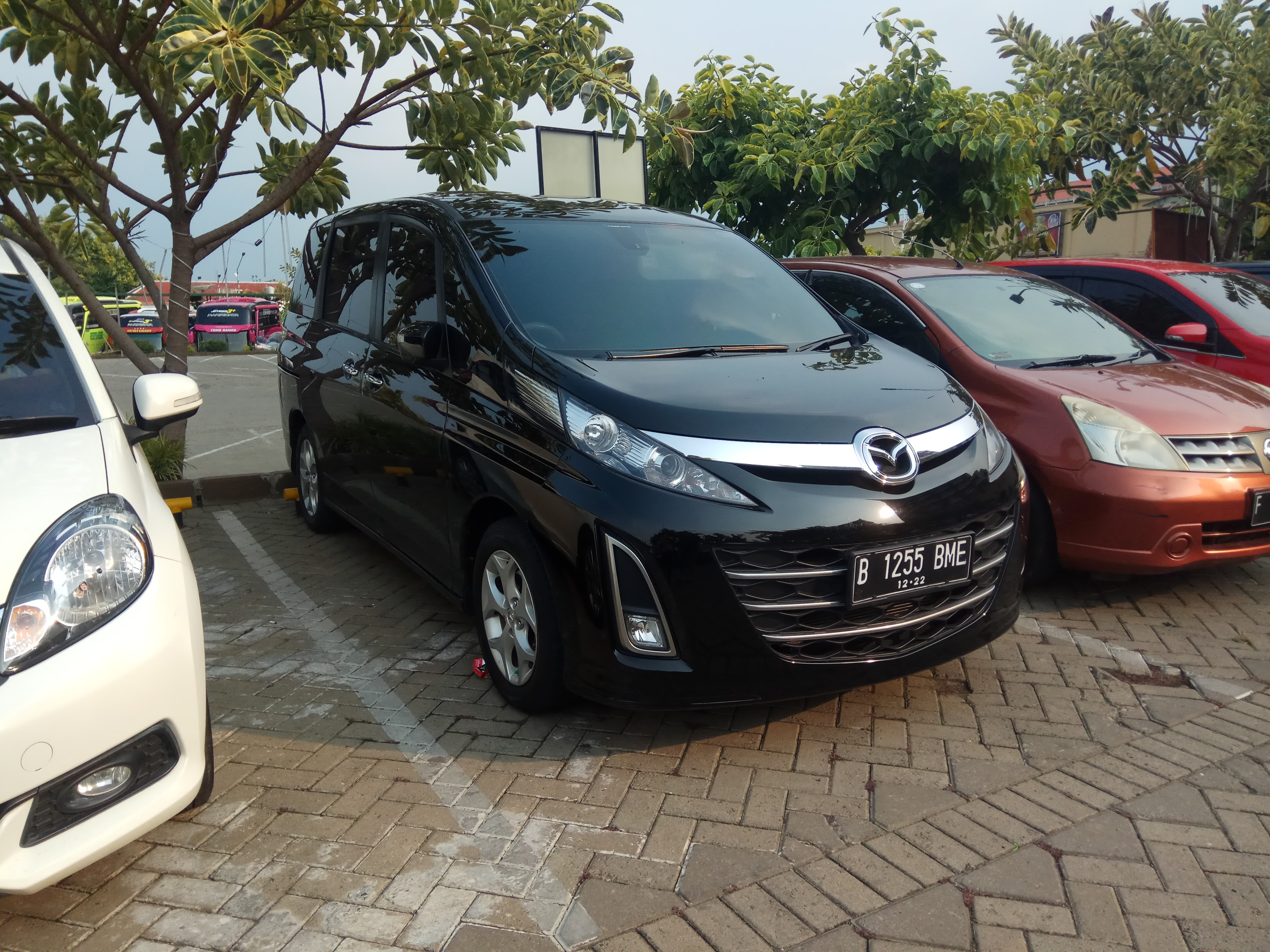
Mazda Biante (Indonesian spec, with the 20CS fascia)

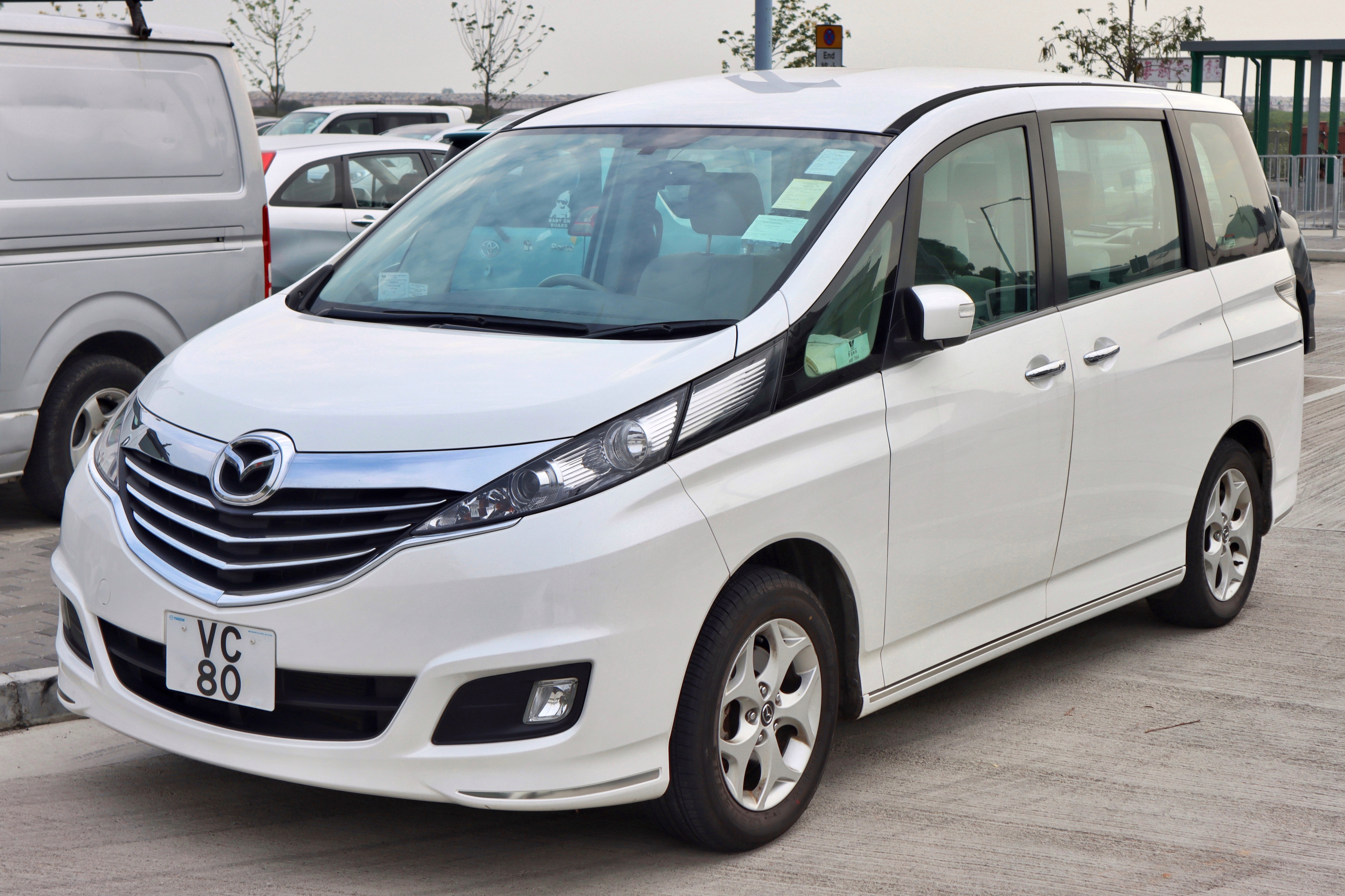
Mazda Biante Granz-Skyactiv (Hong Kong)

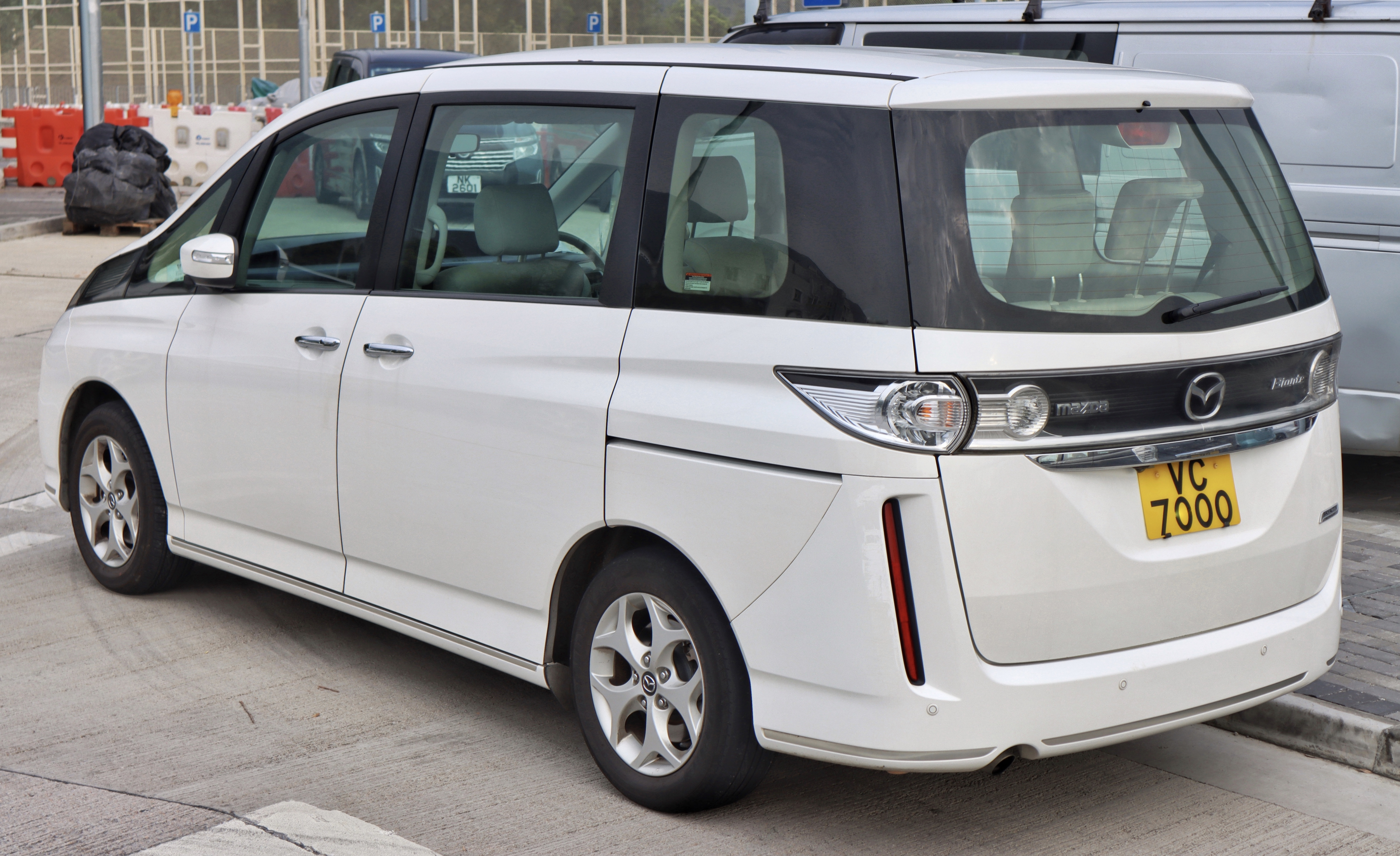
Rear view

The Biante had five grades; 20S, 20CS, 23S, 20C and Granz.

20CS was the cheapest grade, similar to 20C but no fog lamps and more rudimentary equipment. This grade has since been discontinued. This grade was the first to use Nanoe ion filter from Panasonic.

23S, along with 20S and 20CS, also shown in 2008, using the 2260 cc engine, and an exclusive color for its grade, Chili Orange Mica. Now, along with 20CS, this grade has also since been discontinued.

20S is the grade which appeared in its debut in 2008 and the i-Stop feature introduced in 2009. Until now it still running, now it is only available with Skyactiv, meanwhile the original are discontinued.

20C, the replacement of 20CS, appeared in 2010, with fog lamps, but in several years later, this grade had no fog lamps. It replaces the 20CS and for now and later, this grade is among the cheapest of Biante grades.

Later, at the 2011 Tokyo Motor Show, Granz grade was unveiled, with the LED back lamps, new chrome, new bumper, bigger grille, aluminum color, Alleru allergy buster from Panasonic again. Also, 'replacing' the 23S, for now this grade is among the most expensive of all Biante grades.

In May 2013, the Skyactiv G-2.0 Biante was unveiled. Three grades were available with this technology; 20C, 20S and Granz. The difference of original and Skyactiv Biantes are, the original Biantes were 5-speed automatic and AWD, while the Skyactiv versions are Skyactiv-Drive with 6-speed automatic and 2WD (FF).

== Export markets ==
The Biante was launched in Indonesia at the 2012 Indonesia International Motor Show. Indonesia was the first country outside Japan that has sold the Biante. Later at the 2013 Indonesia International Motor Show, Biante Skyactiv was unveiled in Indonesia based on the Japanese version Biante Granz. It was equipped with a 6-speed automatic transmission.

The Biante was also sold in Malaysia, Singapore, Hong Kong, and Brunei.

== Discontinuation ==
In February 2016, Mazda announced that production of all minivans would end within the year. Sales of the MPV/Mazda8 ended in March 2016, while the Premacy/Mazda5 and Biante ended on 23 February 2018, marking the brand's departure from the minivan market.
