= Mazda L engine =

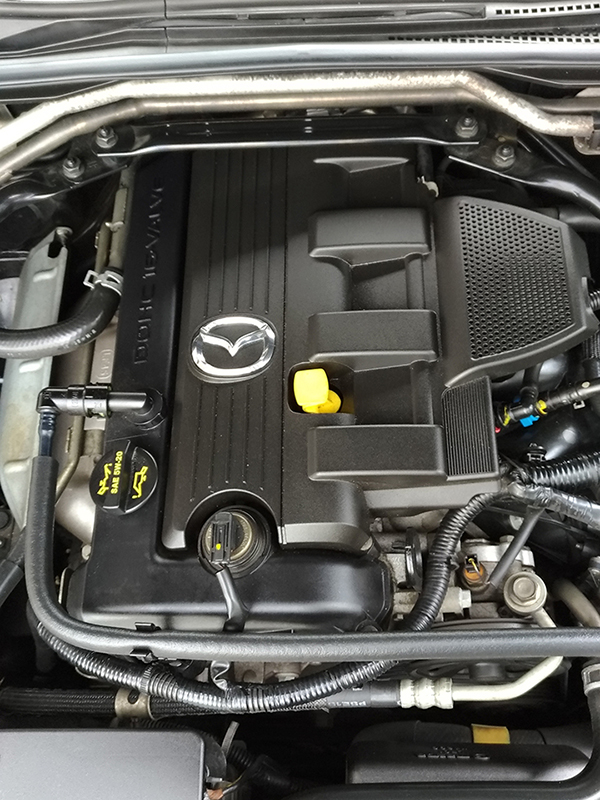
- 2.0 MZR LF-VE engine in a Mazda MX-5 (NC)

Overview
- Manufacturer: Mazda Ford Motor Company
- Also called: MZR; Duratec; EcoBoost
- Production: 2001–present

Layout
- Configuration: Inline-four
- Displacement: 1.8 L (1,798 cc; 109.7 cu in); 2.0 L (1,999 cc; 122.0 cu in); 2.3 L (2,261 cc; 138.0 cu in); 2.5 L (2,488 cc; 151.8 cu in)
- Cylinder bore: 83 mm (3.27 in); 87.5 mm (3.44 in); 89 mm (3.50 in)
- Piston stroke: 83.1 mm (3.27 in); 94 mm (3.70 in); 100 mm (3.94 in)
- Cylinder block material: Aluminum
- Cylinder head material: Aluminum
- Valvetrain: DOHC 4 valves x cyl. with VVT (some versions)
- Compression ratio: 9.7:1, 10.0:1, 10.8:1, 12.1:1

Combustion
- Turbocharger: On some versions since 2010
- Fuel system: Sequential multi-port fuel injection; Direct injection
- Fuel type: Gasoline
- Oil system: Wet sump
- Cooling system: Water-cooled

Output
- Power output: 92–209 kW (125–284 PS; 123–280 hp)
- Torque output: 122–280 lb⋅ft (165–380 N⋅m)

Chronology
- Predecessor: Mazda F engine
- Successor: Mazda Skyactiv-G engine

The Mazda L-series is a mid-sized inline 4-cylinder gasoline piston engine designed by Mazda as part of their MZR family, ranging in displacement from 1.8 to 2.5 liters. Introduced in 2001, it is the evolution of the cast-iron block F-engine. It was co-developed with Ford, who owned a controlling stake in Mazda at the time. Ford uses it as their 1.8 L to 2.5 L Duratec world engine and holds a license to develop engines based on the L-series in perpetuity.

The L-engine uses a chain-driven DOHC, 16-valve valvetrain with an all-aluminum block construction and cast-iron cylinder liners. Other features include fracture-split forged powder metal connecting rods and a one-piece cast crankshaft.

Other features are intake cam-phasing VVT, VTCS, VICS, a stainless steel 4:1 exhaust manifold and a lower main bearing cage for increased block rigidity. Direct-injection is available on the 2.0-liter LF-VD and the DISI turbocharged L3-VDT engine introduced in 2006 for the Mazdaspeed lineup of vehicles.

In 2010, Ford introduced a 2.0-liter GDI turbo variant of the Mazda LF engine design as the EcoBoost, using Ford's own manifold and engine control systems. Ford plans to use the L-engine well into the future for their EcoBoost and Duratec four-cylinder generations. In 2011, Mazda ceased further developments of the L-engine and replaced it with the SkyActiv-G engine—an extensive evolution of the Mazda L-engine. At this time, Ford will be the only manufacturer still using the Mazda L-engine design.

The cylinder head design utilizes directly-actuated bucket lifters operating without hydraulic lash adjusters, necessitating mechanical valve clearance adjustments at regular maintenance intervals. To enhance thermal efficiency and structurally rigid lightweight characteristics, the engine utilizes a structural oil pan made of die-cast aluminum alloy that bolts directly to both the cylinder block and the transmission bellhousing, reinforcing overall powertrain rigidity and mitigating NVH (noise, vibration, and harshness).

== 1.8 L (L8-DE, L8-VE) ==
The 1.8-litre (1,798 cc; 109.7 cu in) version has a nearly-square 83 mm (3.27 in) bore and a 83.1 mm (3.3 in) stroke. Output is 125 hp (92 kW) at 6000 rpm with 122 lb⋅ft (165 N⋅m) of torque at 4250 rpm.

In 2001, Ford introduced its first European Ford engine to use gasoline direct injection technology, badged SCi (Smart Charge injection) for Direct Injection Spark Ignition (DISI). The range will include some turbocharged derivatives, including the 1.1-litre, three-cylinder turbocharged unit showcased at the 2002 Geneva Show. The 1.8 L was the first European Ford engine to use direct injection technology, badged SCi for Smart Charge Injection. This appeared in the Mondeo in 2003 and is today available on the 2.0 L engine as well.

The SCi engines were designed at Ford's Cologne facility and assembled in Valencia, Spain. The SCi engine is paired with a specially designed six-speed manual transmission. The 1.8 SCi engine fitted to the Ford Mondeo from 2003-2007 is the only engine in the range not to be E10 compatible.

European 1.8 L and 2.0 L Duratec HE engines are built at the Valencia Engine Plant in Spain. Duratec FFV is a flex fuel version of the 1.8 L Duratec-HE modified to run on E85 fuel. 1.8L Focus C-Max and Focus Mk II versions use a drive-by-wire throttle to improve responsiveness.

Ford's versions are rated at 92 kW (123 hp; 125 PS) at 6000 rpm and 165 N⋅m (122 lb⋅ft) of torque at 4500 rpm, with a 10.8:1 compression ratio.

Applications:
- 2002-2012 Mazda6 for Europe
- 2003-2010 Ford C-Max
- 2004-2018 Mazda Premacy/Mazda5
- 2005-2015 Mazda MX-5 for Europe
- 2006-2009 Volvo C30
- 2005-2010 Volvo S40
- 2005-2010 Volvo V50
- 2000-2007 Ford Mondeo
- 2005-2010 Ford Focus
- 2006-2009 Morgan 4/4 1800

== 2.0 L (LF-DE, LF-VE, LF-VD) ==
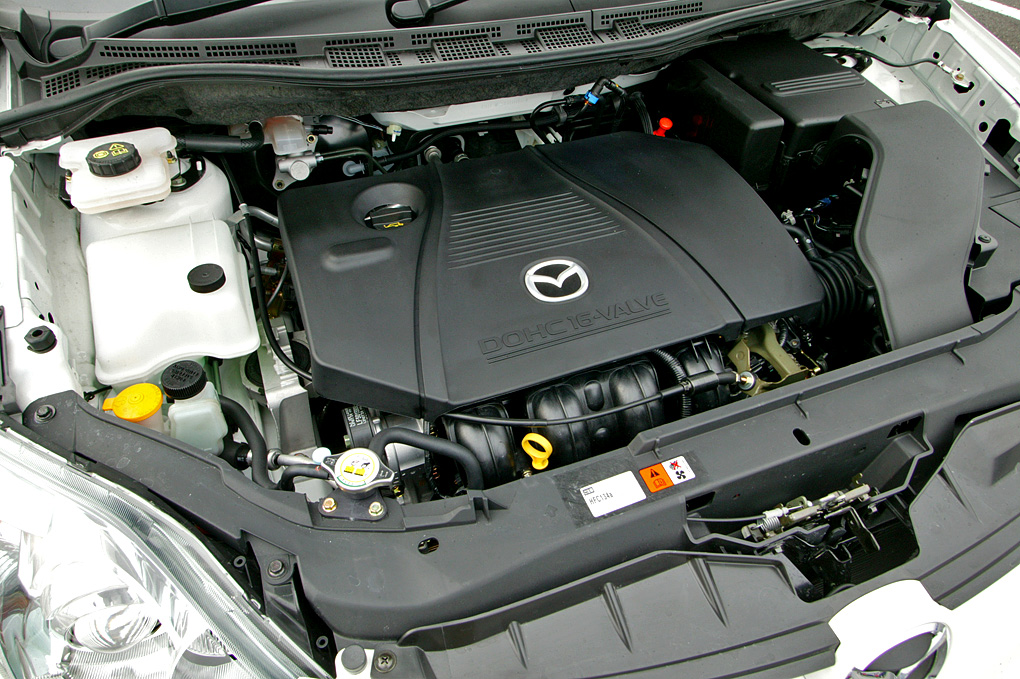
Mazda LF-DE

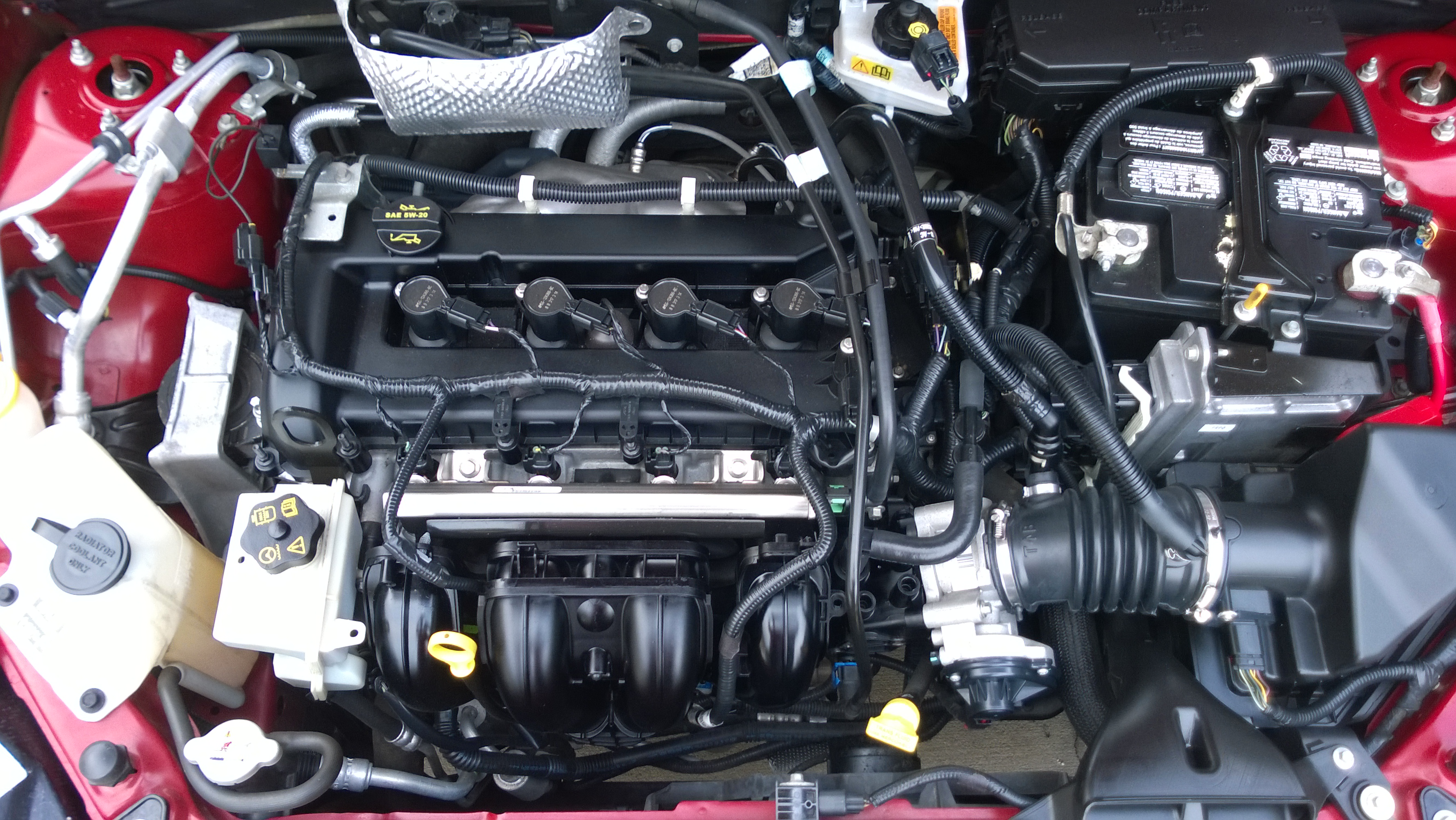
Duratec 20 under the hood of a 2009 Focus

The 2.0-litre (1,999 cc; 122.0 cu in) version has 10:1 compression ratio, an 87.5 mm (3.44 in) bore and it shares the 83.1 mm (3.27 in) stroke of the 1.8 L. The LF-DE and LF-VE use sequential multi-port fuel injection; a direct-injection variant, the LF-VD, was added in 2009 (see below). Changes to the engine include switching from a cast aluminum to a reinforced plastic intake manifold.

Ford's version is rated at 107 kW (143 hp; 145 PS) of power at 6000 rpm and 185 N⋅m (136 lb⋅ft) of torque at 4500 rpm with a 10.8:1 compression ratio. This engine is also used by Volvo, called B4204S3 (or B4204S4 as Flexfuel engine capable of running on E85).

On the 2008 Focus, output is 101 kW (135 hp; 137 PS) at 6000 rpm with 184 N⋅m (136 lb⋅ft) of torque at 4250 rpm. The 2007 Focus with the PZEV emissions package produces 97 kW (130 hp; 132 PS) at 6000 rpm with 175 N⋅m (129 lb⋅ft) of torque at 4000 rpm. California Partial Zero-Emissions Vehicle (PZEV) cars utilized an advanced air injection system into the inlet manifold to not only lower emissions, but raise engine efficiency. On the 2008 Focus, output is 104 kW (139 hp; 141 PS) at 6000 rpm with 184 N⋅m (136 lb⋅ft) of torque at 4250 rpm. The 2009 Focus had 107 kW (143 hp; 145 PS) when equipped with manual transmission due to a higher flowing exhaust system. The 2008 Focus with the PZEV emissions package produces 98 kW (131 hp; 133 PS) at 6000 rpm and 180 N⋅m (130 lb⋅ft) of torque at 4250 rpm.

Mazda's LF-VD version, marketed as the MZR 2.0 DISI, is equipped with Direct Injection Spark Ignition (DISI) and a higher compression ratio for improved efficiency, and was sold in the Japanese and European markets alongside the port-injected versions. It debuted in the second-generation Mazda3 (Axela) at the 2009 Geneva Motor Show, paired with Mazda's i-stop start-stop system, which relies on direct injection to restart the engine. It produces 110 kW (148 hp; 150 PS) at 6500 rpm and 187 N⋅m (138 lb⋅ft) of torque at 4000 rpm; the European-specification Mazda3 2.0 DISI i-stop was rated at 111 kW (151 PS; 149 hp) at 6200 rpm and 191 N⋅m (141 lb⋅ft) at 4500 rpm.

For the 2012 model year, Ford introduced a 2.0-litre engine with direct injection, Ti-VCT and E85 flex-fuel capability in the third-generation Ford Focus for North America. With a 12.0:1 compression ratio, it produces 119 kW (160 hp; 162 PS) at 6500 rpm and 198 N⋅m (146 lb⋅ft) of torque at 4450 rpm. This version is referred to as the "Duratec 20."

The Ford Duratec 20 engines are built in Dearborn, Michigan, United States, and Chihuahua, Mexico, with some being built by Mazda in Hiroshima, Japan.

A turbocharged, direct-injected 2.0-litre Ford EcoBoost engine was introduced in 2010, first appearing in the European Ford S-Max and Galaxy. It is reported to be derived from the L-series engine.

Applications:
- 2003–2013 Mazda Axela/Mazda3 (LF-VD direct-injection version from 2009, Japanese and European markets)
- 2002–2008 Mazda6 for Europe
- 2006–2007 Mazda Premacy/Mazda5
- 2006–2015 Mazda MX-5/Roadster
- 2008–2018 Mazda Biante
- 2007–2010 Ford C-Max
- 2004–2022 Ford EcoSport
- 2004–2018 Ford Focus Mk 3
- 2000–2007 Ford Mondeo Mk 3
- 2007–2010 Ford Mondeo Mk 4
- 2010–2012 Ford Transit Connect
- 2006–2010 Volvo C30
- 2007–2010 Volvo S40
- 2007–2010 Volvo V50
- 2008–2010 Volvo V70
- 2007–2010 Volvo S80
- 2006–2012 Besturn B70
- 2015–2016 Zenos E10
- 2006–2012 Caterham 7 Superlight R300/400/500
- 2008–2014 Caterham 7 Roadsport 175/200
- 2009–2015 Caterham 7 CSR 175
- 2012–present Caterham 7 420/620R/S (supercharged)
- 2014–present Caterham 7 335/360/420/480/485
- 2012–2016 Caterham 7 Supersport R
- 2011–present Caterham-Lola SP/300.R (supercharged)
- 2005–2020 Morgan +4
- 2008–2018 Mitsuoka Himiko
- 2015–present Tatuus-Cosworth MSV F4-016 (developed by Cosworth)
- 2010–2016 Ginetta G40R
- 2000s–present Dare Ginetta G12

== 2.3L (L3-VE, L3-NS, L3-DE) ==
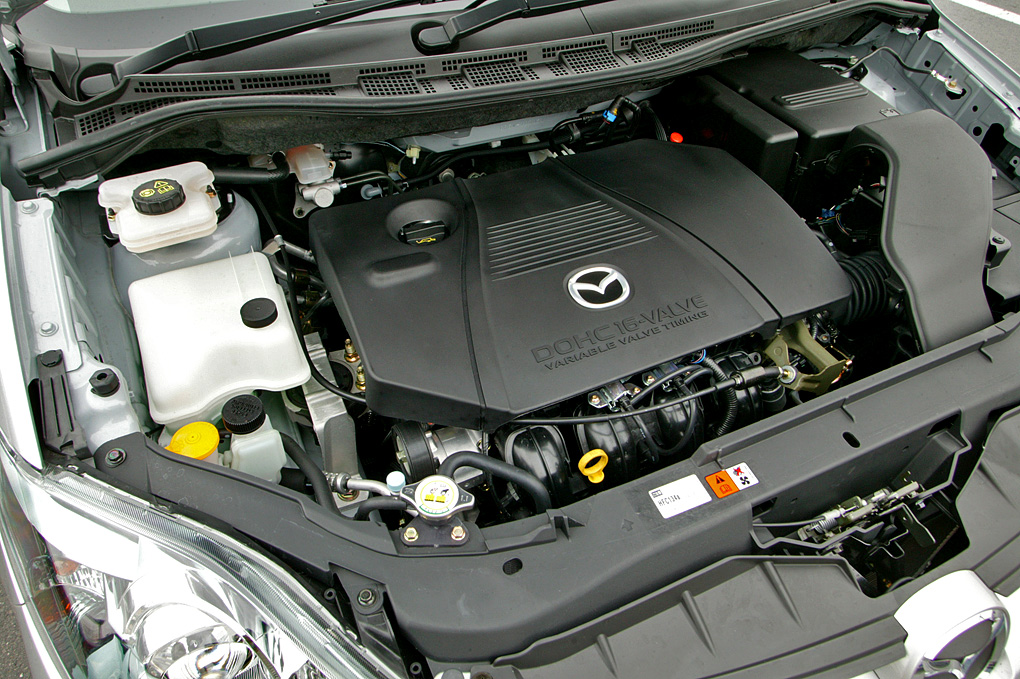
Mazda L3-VE

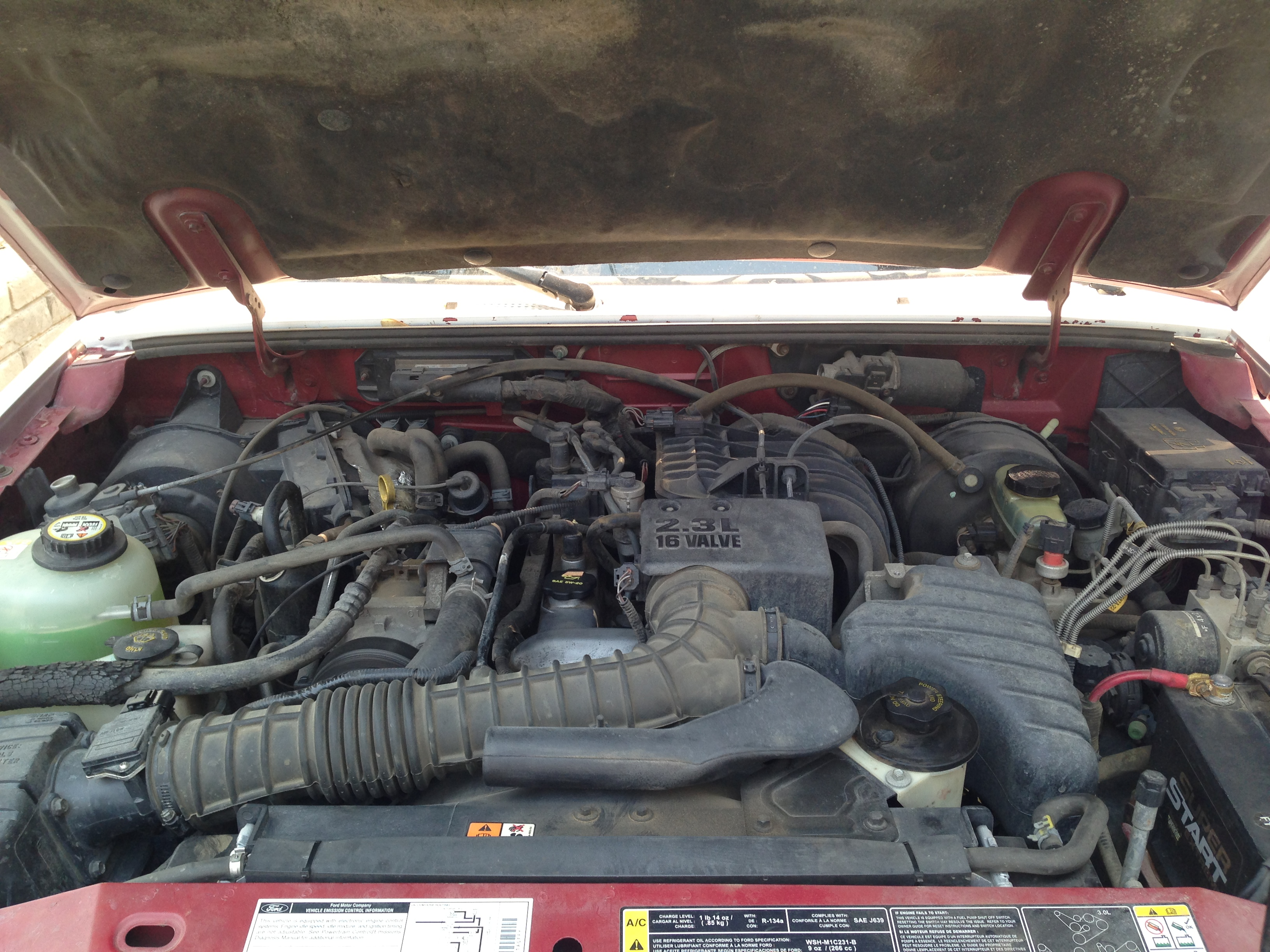
Duratec 23NS in a 2002 Ranger

The 2.3 L; 138.0 cu in (2,261 cc) version uses the same 87.5 mm (3.44 in) bore as the 2.0 L but with a long 94 mm (3.70 in) stroke. It produces around 122 kW (164 hp; 166 PS) at 6000 rpm and 195 N⋅m (144 lb⋅ft) between 4000 and 4500 rpm.

The 23EW was built in Chihuahua, Mexico for transverse installation in several front-drive Ford/Mercury/Mazda vehicles through the 2009 model year. "EW" in the Ford designation code denotes east–west configuration, or transverse mounting. Three versions of the 23EW have been produced. A standard DOHC 16V version was used in the North American Focus producing 113 kW (151 hp; 153 PS) at 5750 rpm with 154 lb⋅ft (209 N⋅m) of torque at 4250 rpm. An iVCT (intake variable cam timing)-equipped DOHC 16V version was used in the 2006–2009 Ford Fusion/Mercury Milan, and several generations of CD2-based crossovers.

The 23NS was built in Dearborn, Michigan, for the Ford Ranger and North American market Mazda B-Series from the 2001 model year to the 2011 model year. "NS" denotes north–south configuration, or longitudinal mounting. These engines are tuned for torque-bias making them suitable for light-truck use and are not equipped with iVCT or VICS. There are two versions of the 23NS with slight differences:

2001-2003 Ranger 2.3L Duratec	2004+ Ranger 2.3L Duratec
101 kW (135 hp; 137 PS) at 5050 rpm	107 kW (143 hp; 145 PS) at 5250 rpm
153 lb⋅ft (207 N⋅m) at 3750 rpm	154 lb⋅ft (209 N⋅m) at 3750 rpm
intake manifold runner control/swirl control	no IMRC / swirl control
MAF housing a separate piece from the air box lid (with older style MAF sensor)	MAF housing integrated into the air box lid (with newer style MAF sensor)
electrically heated thermostat	regular thermostat
J1850PWM OBD-II protocol	CAN OBD-II protocol (2007–2011)
rated 24 city, 28 hwy (old EPA calcs) for MT	rated 24 city, 29 hwy (old EPA calcs) for MT

The Duratec 23E is a version of the Duratec 23 which meets California PZEV emissions standards.

In some Eastern and Middle Eastern models, the Mazda6 had a tuned version of this 2.3-liter engine producing 178 hp (133 kW; 180 PS) at 6500 rpm and 159 lb⋅ft (215 N⋅m) at 4000 rpm.

A high-efficiency Atkinson cycle version was used in the Ford Escape, Mercury Mariner, and Mazda Tribute Hybrids.

A Cosworth tuned version of this engine is found in the BAC Mono producing 209 kW (280 hp; 284 PS) and 207 lb⋅ft (280 N⋅m) of torque, making it the most powerful version of this engine.

Applications:
- 2001–2010 Mazda B-Series
- 2002–2005 Mazda MPV
- 2003–2008 Mazda Atenza/Mazda6
- 2004–2007 Mazda Axela/Mazda3
- 2004–2008 Mazda Tribute
- 2006–2010 Mazda Premacy/Mazda5
- 2008–2018 Mazda Biante
- 2001–2011 Ford Ranger
- 2003–2007 Ford Focus
- 2005–2008 Ford Escape/Mercury Mariner
- 2006–2009 Ford Fusion/Mercury Milan
- 2010–BAC Mono (developed by Cosworth)
- 2006–2012 Besturn B70
- 2004–? Caterham 7 CSR 200/260 (developed by Cosworth)
- 2000s–present Dare Ginetta G12

== 2.3L DISI Turbo (L3-VDT) ==
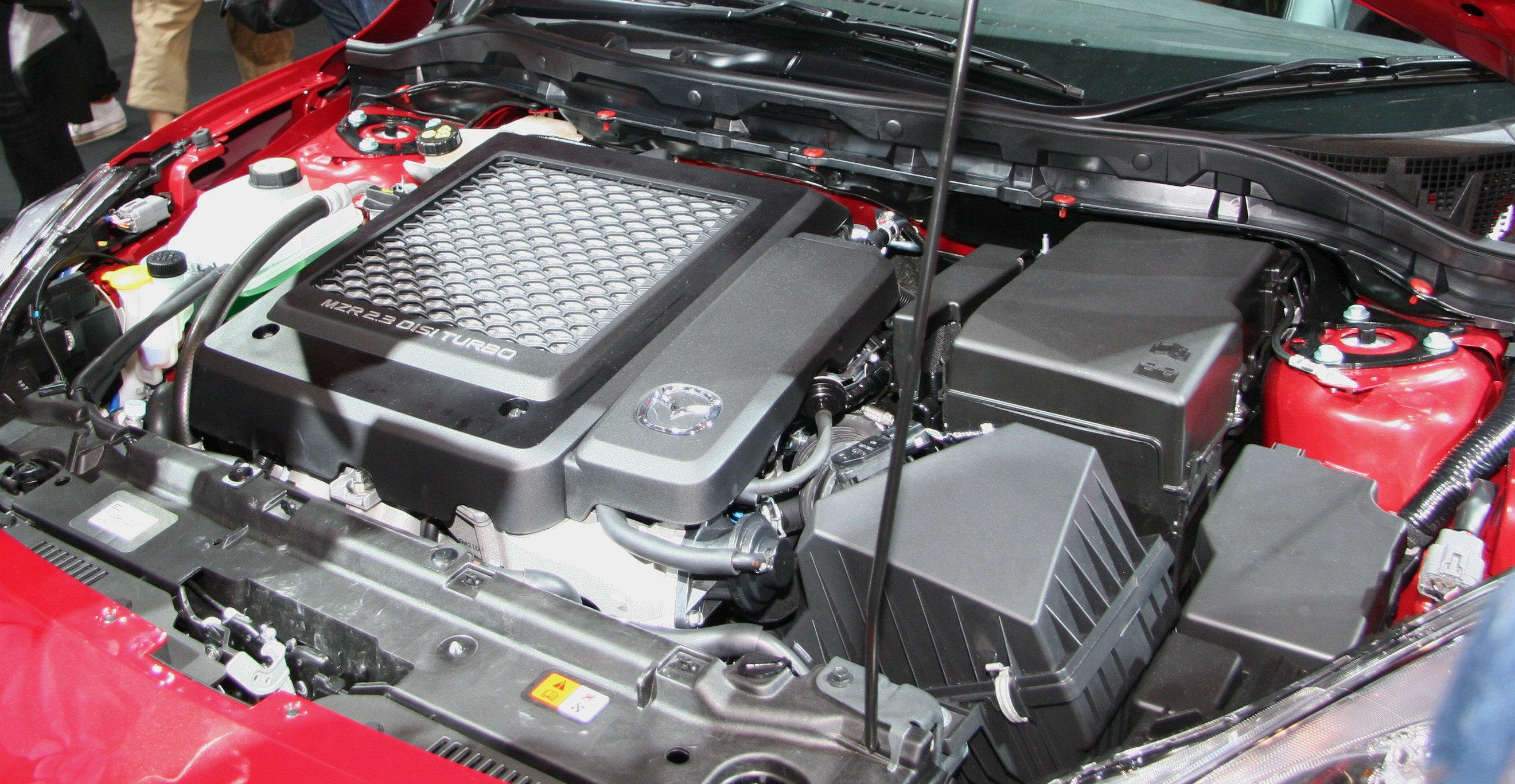
Mazda L3-VDT direct injected turbo

Introduced in 2005 with the Mazdaspeed6, the L3-VDT is a turbocharged version of the 2.3 L with Direct Injection Spark Ignition (DISI). It develops 263 hp (196 kW; 267 PS) at 5,500 rpm and 280 lb⋅ft (380 N⋅m) at 3,000 rpm and is capable of propelling the Mazdaspeed3 from 0–60 mph (97 km/h) in 5.6 seconds.

The L3-VDT features a bore of 87.5 mm and a stroke of 94.0 mm, identical to the naturally aspirated L3-VE. The 16V setup is controlled by a chain driven DOHC.

L3s produced prior to 2010 are notorious for losing tension in the chain. The loose timing chain causes the timing of the engine and the VVT in particular to be improperly timed, often resulting in pistons colliding with the valves.

In 2010 the L3-VDT was revised to fix some of the common failures: the shape of the cylinder head was reworked, possibly to concentrate fuel near the sparkplug, the ECU was made faster and featured more air/fuel cells to reduce the chance of the engine leaning out. Another change was a fix for the timing chain tension issues. The turbo seals were also updated.

While the 2.0 L Ford EcoBoost engine and its later 2.3 L variant share a cylinder block with the L3-VDT and are derived from the Mazda L architecture, little else is shared between the EcoBoost and L3-VDT and they should not be confused with one another. The EcoBoost engines have different turbochargers, Ford-designed heads, different direct injection systems along with featuring Ford's Ti-VCT variable valve timing system instead of Mazda's S-VT.

Applications:
- 2005–2007 Mazda Atenza MPS/Mazda6 MPS/Mazdaspeed6
- 2006–2010 Mazda MPV (JDM only)
- 2006–2012 Mazda CX-7
- 2006–2012 Mazda Axela MPS/Mazdaspeed3

== 2.5 L (L5-VE) ==
Introduced in non-North American markets for the MY2008 and North American markets for MY2009, the 2.5 L L5-VE is an updated, bored and stroked version of the L3-VE 2.3 L. The 2.5 L; 151.8 cu in (2,488 cc) L5 four-cylinder engine has an 89 mm (3.50 in) bore and a 100 mm (3.94 in) stroke, with a compression ratio of 9.7:1. The standard crankshaft is cast iron with eight counterweights. To increase durability of the bore, Mazda uses cast iron for the cylinder liners. This offers enhanced high-heat tolerance as well as reduced friction. The increased stroke of 100 mm (3.94 in), up from 94 mm (3.70 in) of the L3, allows a taller (numerically lower) final-drive ratio resulting in lower-rpm while cruising to increase fuel economy. It also uses iVCT. It produces 170 bhp (127 kW; 172 PS) at its 6000 rpm redline (168 hp (125 kW; 170 PS) in PZEV trim) and 167 lb⋅ft (226 N⋅m) of torque at 4000 rpm (166 lb⋅ft (225 N⋅m) in PZEV trim). Certain versions are rated at 175 hp (130 kW; 177 PS) at 6000 rpm with 172 lb⋅ft (233 N⋅m) of torque at 4500 rpm.

Ford has developed an Atkinson cycle variant of the Mazda L5 engine for use in the Ford Fusion Hybrid, Ford Escape Hybrid and Ford Maverick Hybrid vehicles. They also used this variant under the Duratec engine family name in the 2010-2019 Ford Fusion. This engine was named one of Ward's 10 Best Engines for 2010. Fuel saving features include adaptive knock control and aggressive deceleration fuel cutoff. This and the 2.3 L competed with Toyota's 2.4 L 2AZ-FE engine, sharing similar technology.

Applications:
- 2008–2012 Mazda Atenza/Mazda6 (non-North America)
- 2009–2013 Mazda6 (North America)
- 2009-2012 Mazda CX-7 (North America & Australia)
- 2009–2011 Mazda Tribute
- 2010–2013 Mazda Axela/Mazda3
- 2009–2019 Ford Escape
- 2010–2020 Ford Fusion
- 2011–2014 Ford Ranger (Australia)
- 2014–2018 Ford Transit Connect
- 2022–present Ford Maverick Hybrid
- 2010–2011 Mercury Milan
- 2012 Lincoln MKZ Hybrid
- 2000s–present Dare Ginetta G12

== MZR-R ==
In late 2006, Mazda announced an agreement with Advanced Engine Research (AER) to develop the MZR-R motor for sports car racing. It is a 2.0 L turbocharged I4 based on the production MZR block. The engine will initially be used by the Mazda factory team in the American Le Mans Series as a replacement for their R20B rotary, then later sold to customer teams.

== Data table ==
Code	Displacement	Bore	Stroke	Compression ratio	Max. power	Max torque	Aspiration	Fuel injection	S-VT	Sources
L8-DE	1,798 cc (109.7 cu in)	83.0 mm (3.27 in)	83.1 mm (3.27 in)	10.8:1	93 kW (126 PS; 125 hp)	167 N⋅m (123 lb⋅ft)	natural	port	no	
LF-DE	1,998 cc (121.9 cu in)	87.5 mm (3.44 in)	83.1 mm (3.27 in)	10.0:1	110 kW (150 PS; 148 hp)	182 N⋅m (134 lb⋅ft)	natural	port	no	
LF-VE	1,998 cc (121.9 cu in)	87.5 mm (3.44 in)	83.1 mm (3.27 in)	10.8:1	118 kW (160 PS; 158 hp)	188 N⋅m (139 lb⋅ft)	natural	port	yes	
LF-VD	1,999 cc (122.0 cu in)	87.5 mm (3.44 in)	83.1 mm (3.27 in)	11.2:1	111 kW (151 PS; 149 hp)	191 N⋅m (141 lb⋅ft)	natural	direct	yes	
L3-DE	2,260 cc (138 cu in)	87.5 mm (3.44 in)	94 mm (3.7 in)	9.7:1	120 kW (163 PS; 161 hp)	208 N⋅m (153 lb⋅ft)	natural	port	no	
L3-VE	2,260 cc (138 cu in)	87.5 mm (3.44 in)	94 mm (3.7 in)	10.6:1	133 kW (181 PS; 178 hp)	215 N⋅m (159 lb⋅ft)	natural	port	yes	
L3-VDT	2,260 cc (138 cu in)	87.5 mm (3.44 in)	94 mm (3.7 in)	9.5:1	196 kW (266 PS; 263 hp)	380 N⋅m (280 lb⋅ft)	turbocharged	direct	yes	
L5-VE	2,488 cc (151.8 cu in)	89 mm (3.5 in)	100 mm (3.9 in)	9.7:1	125 kW (170 PS; 168 hp)	226 N⋅m (167 lb⋅ft)	natural	port	yes	

== See also ==
- Mazda MZR engine
- Mazda F engine
- List of Mazda engines
- Ford Duratec engine
