= Bestune B70 =

Mid-size sedan

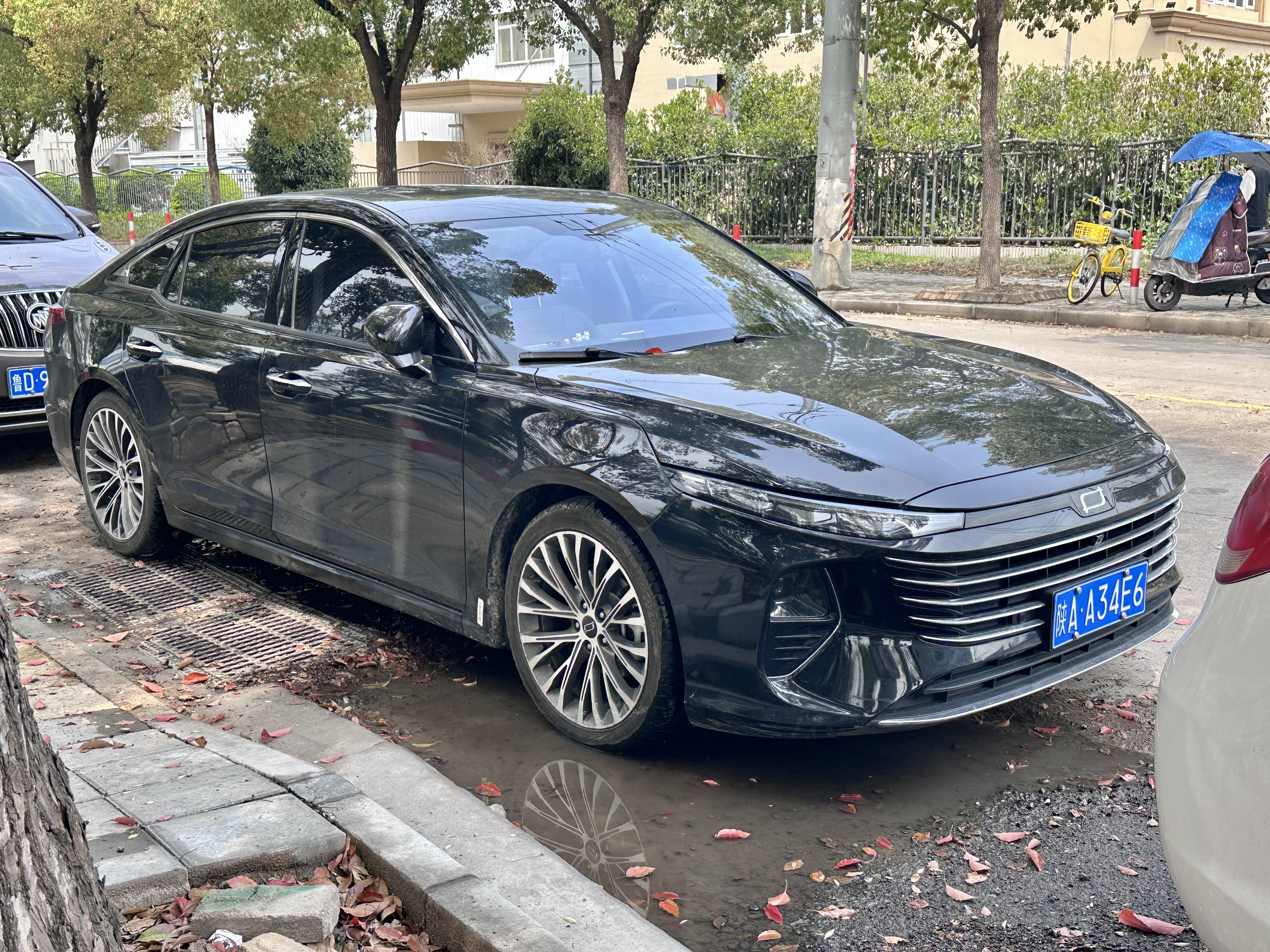

Overview
- Manufacturer: Bestune (FAW Group)
- Production: 2006–2026 (China); 2022–present (export)

Body and chassis
- Class: Mid-size car (D)
- Body style: 4-door sedan

The Bestune B70 is a mid-size sedan produced by the FAW Group under the brand name Bestune.

The first generation B70 was developed with the Ford CD3 platform shared with the Mazda6, and was produced from 2006 to 2014 with a mid-cycle facelift in 2012.

The second generation B70 was produced from 2014 to 2019 and was also built on the same platform as the Mazda6 with an additional RS performance variant available with a Volkswagen-sourced turbo engine.

The third generation B70 was produced from 2020, the first car to be bult on FAW's FMA architecture.

The B70 was removed from the Bestune China website in June 2026, however production will continue for export markets.

== First generation (2006) ==
First generation
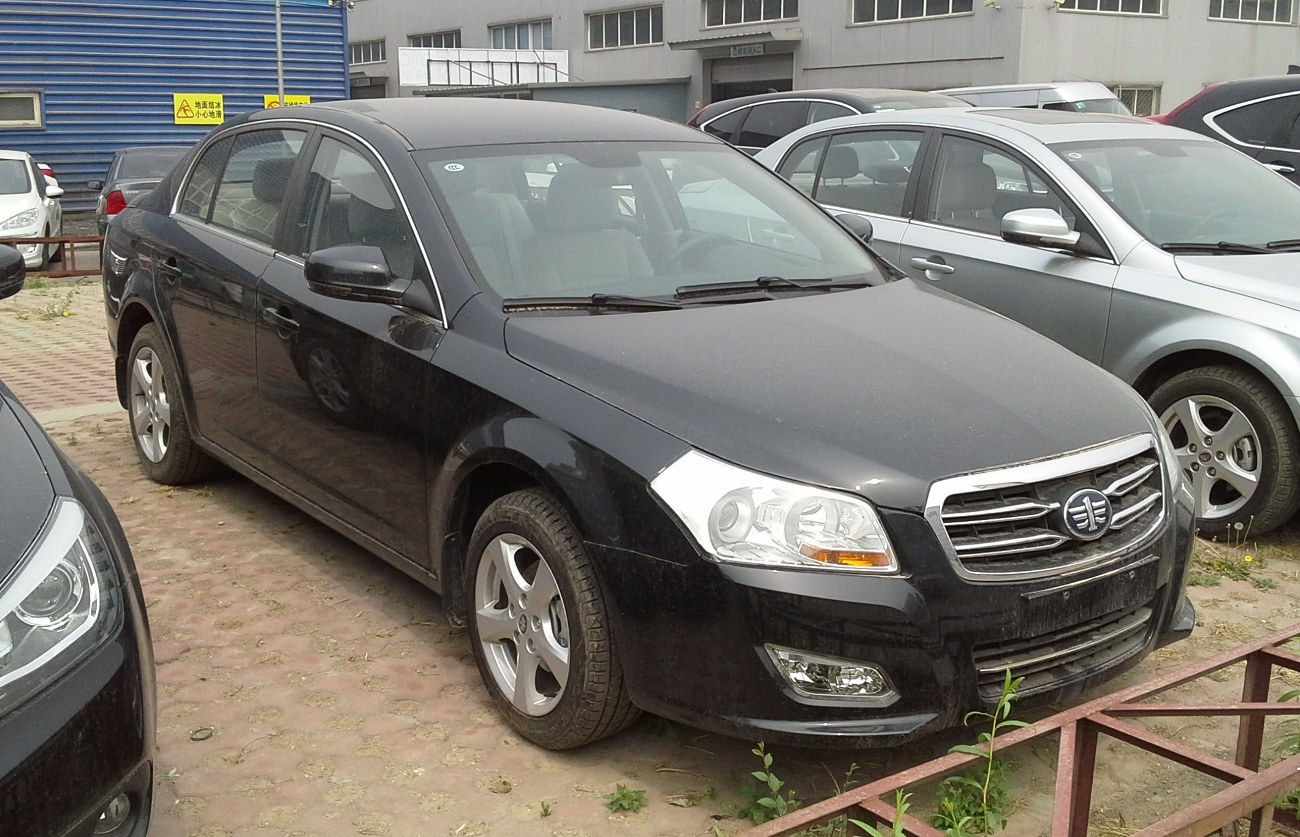

Overview
- Production: 2006–2014
- Assembly: China: Changchun

Body and chassis
- Layout: Front engine, front-wheel drive

Powertrain
- Engine: Petrol: 1.8 L CA4GD5 I4; 2.0 L LF I4; 2.3 L L3 I4
- Transmission: 6-speed manual; 5-speed automatic; 6-speed automatic

Dimensions
- Wheelbase: 2,675 mm (105.3 in)
- Length: 4,705–4,729 mm (185.2–186.2 in)
- Width: 1,782 mm (70.2 in)
- Height: 1,465 mm (57.7 in)

The first generation B70 is technically based on the first generation of the Mazda6. The car was introduced in 2006 and the engine of this car was made by Mazda. It was revised in 2012.

The car is optionally powered by a 2.0 litre engine with 108 kW (145 hp; 147 PS) or a 2.3 litre engine with 120 kW (161 hp; 163 PS) and both engines are sourced from Mazda. For the 2.0 L version, a six-speed manual transmission and a five-speed automatic are available, while the 2.3 L version is automatic only. The facelifted B70 ran on a 1.8 litre engine from FAW.

The security equipment is correspondingly much higher than the price of Chinese cars. Airbags for driver and front passenger are as standard as tire-pressure monitoring system, ABS and a traction control. For a surcharge there are numerous other airbags. Other equipment includes air conditioning as standard; for an extra charge, there are things like DVD player and navigation system.

An FCV variant was unveiled as a concept car on 15 April 2010.

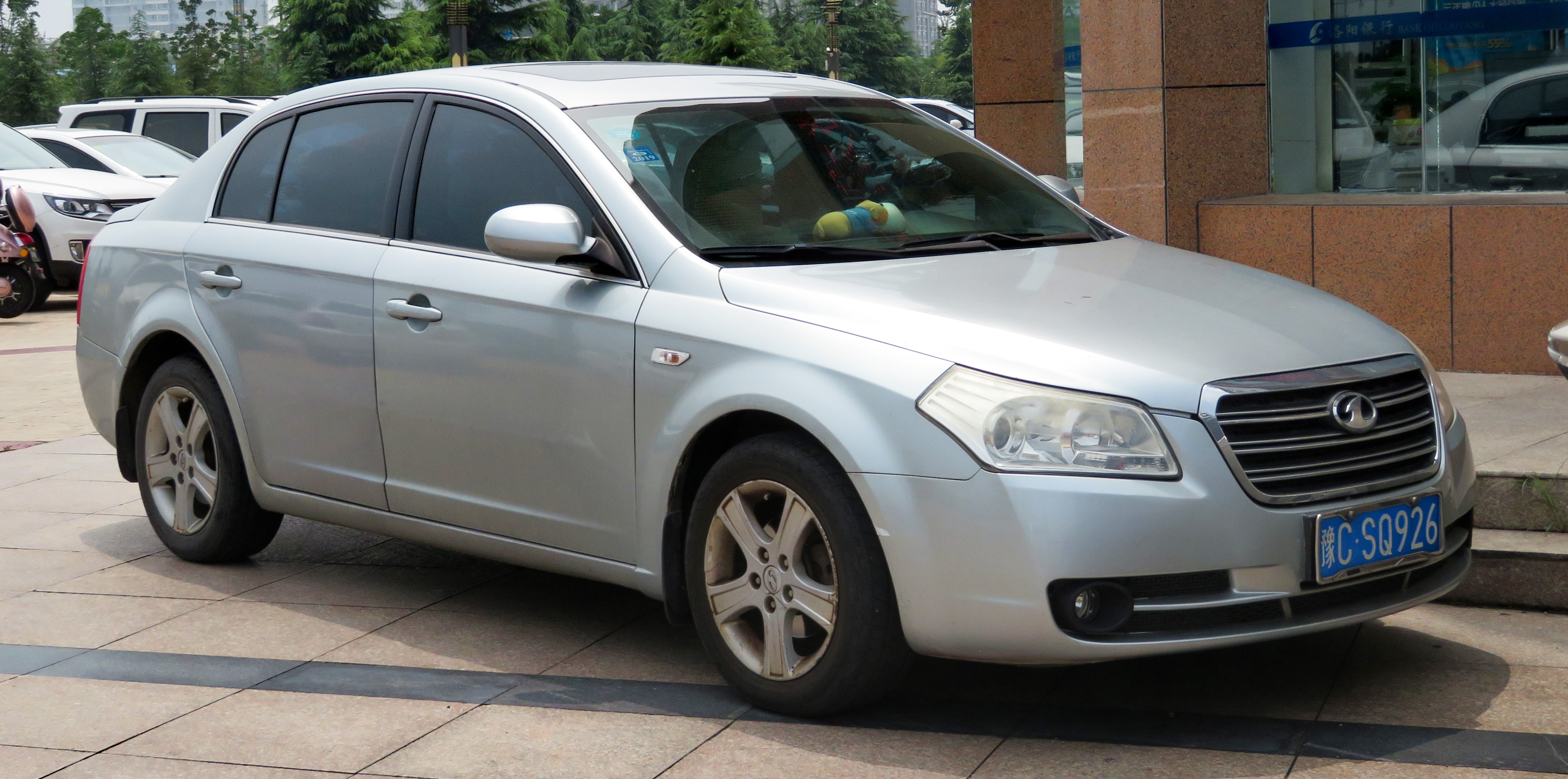
Besturn B70 I (pre-facelift)

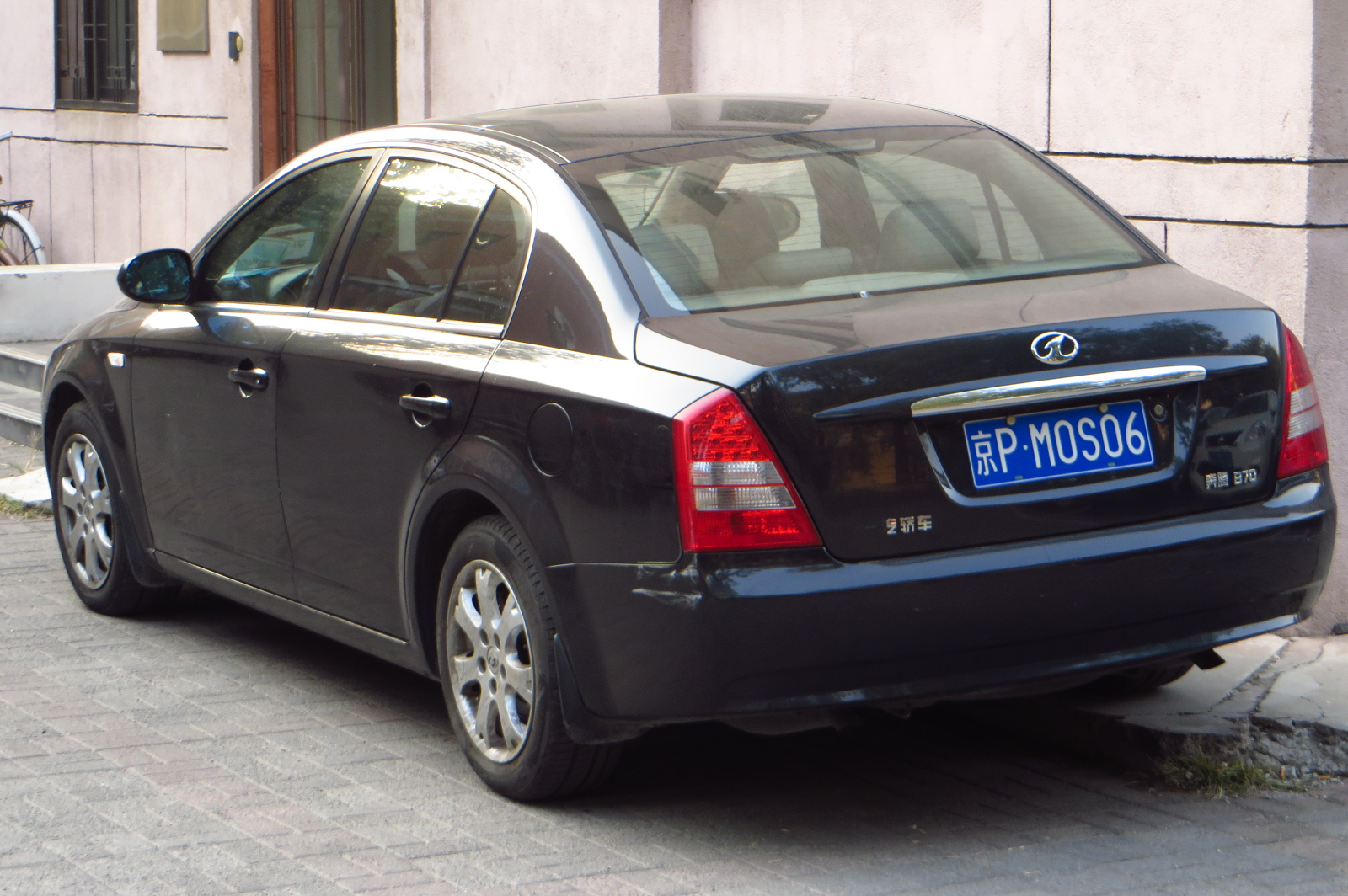
Rear view

=== 2012 (facelift) ===
The first generation B70 received a facelift in 2012 significantly changing the design of the front grilles and rear end. An additional 1.8-litre engine with 102 kW was added to the lineup, while the 2.0-litre engine producing 108 kW (145 hp; 147 PS) continues to be available. The 2.0-litre engine is 27 kilograms (60 lb) heavier than the 1.8-litre engine, and the top speed is claimed to be 200 kilometres per hour (120 mph) for both variants. The facelifted B70 debuted at the 2011 Shanghai Auto Show in April 2011 alongside the facelifted B50 sedan.

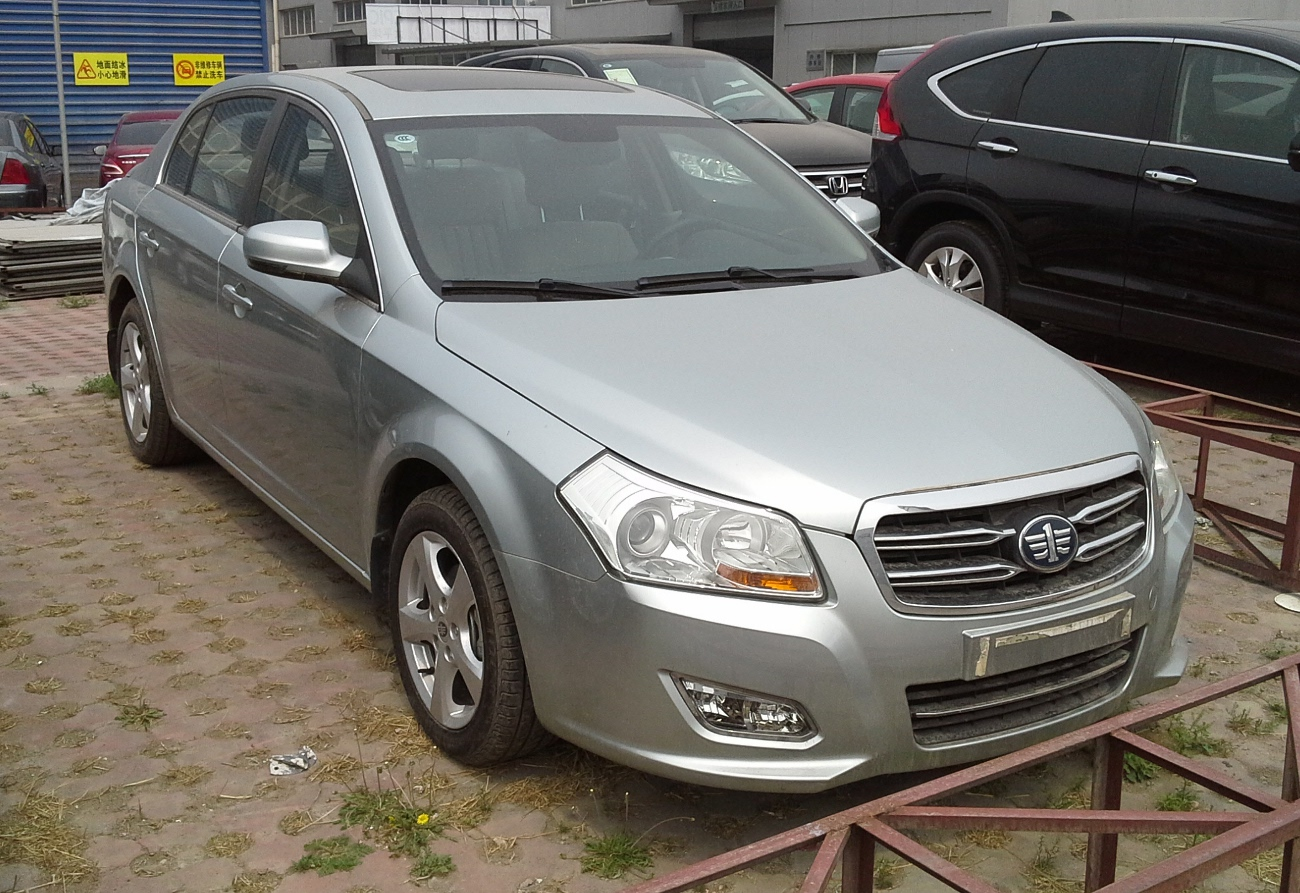
Besturn B70 I 2012 (facelift)

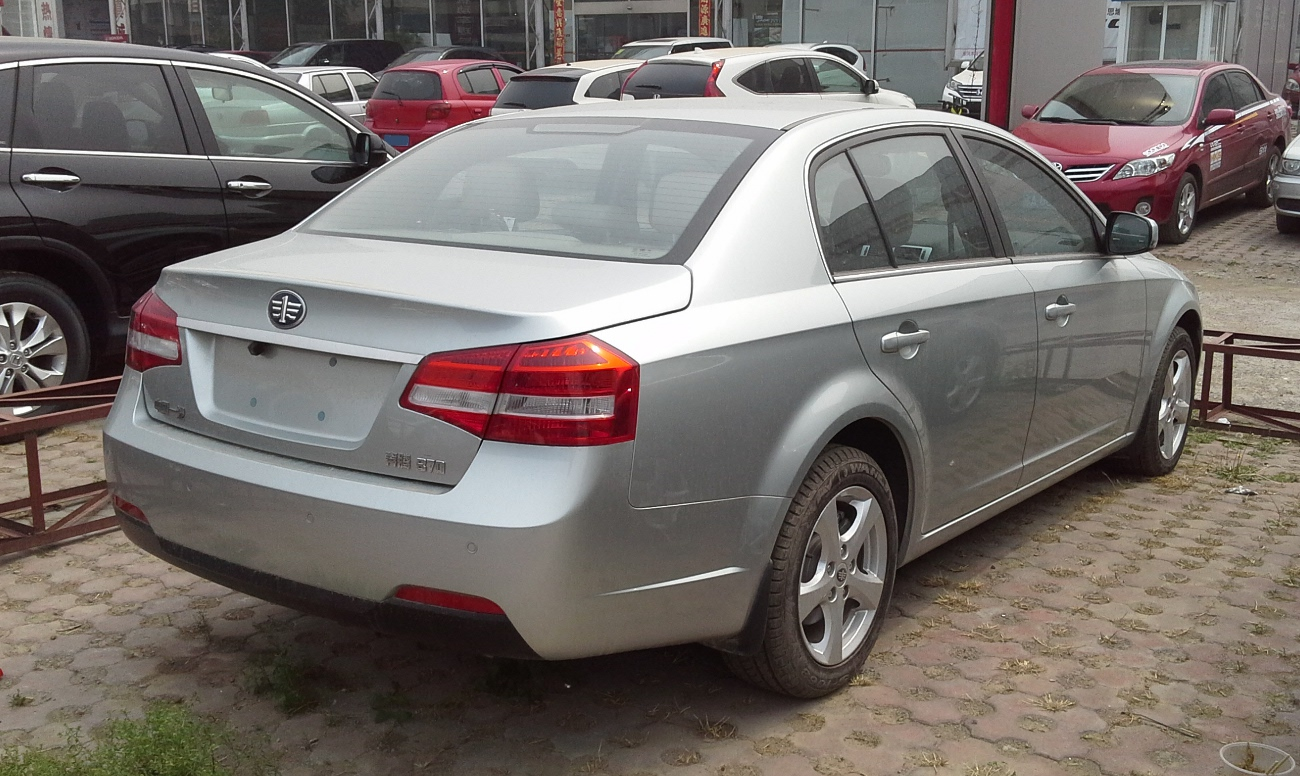
Rear view

== Second generation (2014) ==
Second generation
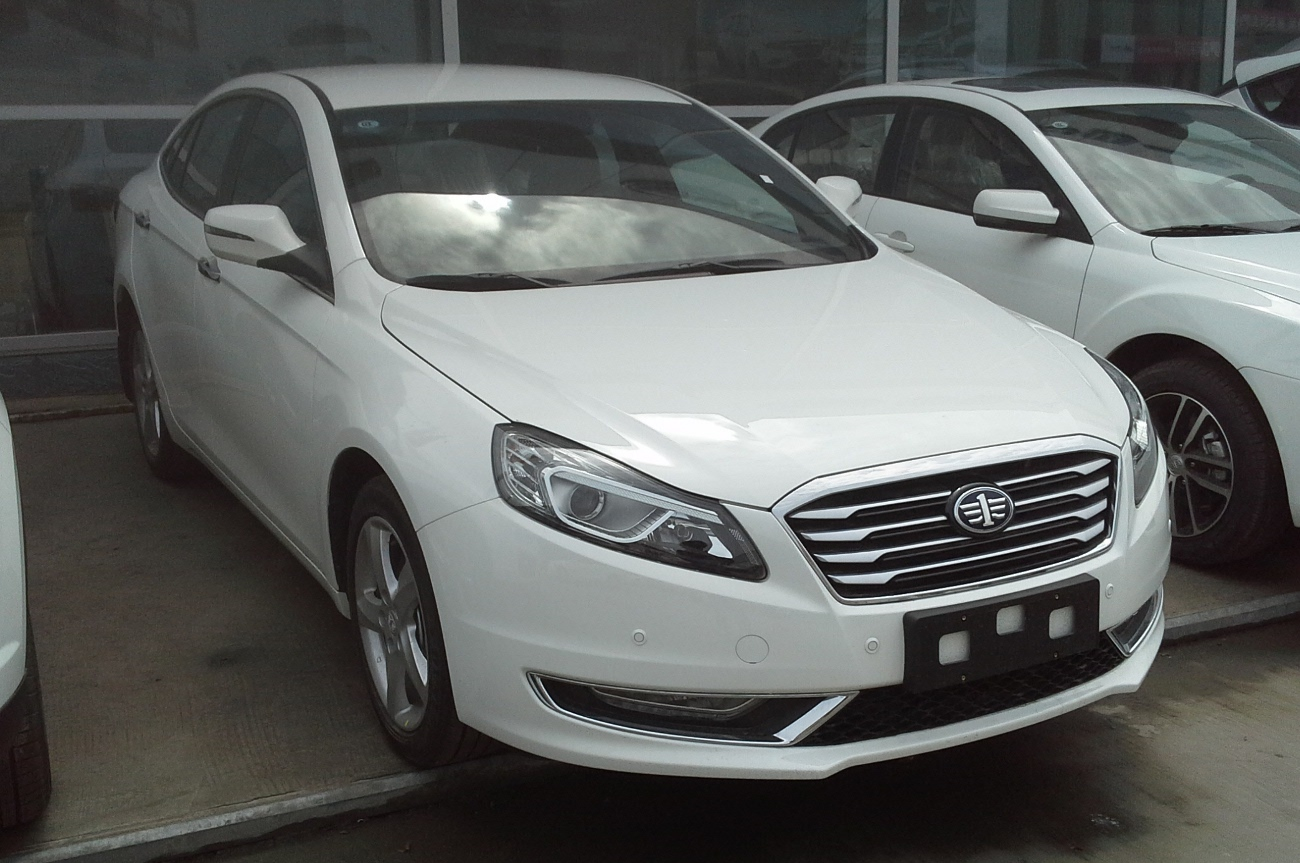

Overview
- Also called: Pyeonghwa Zunma 1811 (North Korea)
- Production: 2014–2019
- Assembly: China: Changchun

Body and chassis
- Layout: Front engine, front-wheel drive

Powertrain
- Engine: Petrol: 1.8 L CA4GC18T turbo I4; 2.0 L CA4GD1 I4
- Transmission: 6-speed manual; 6-speed automatic

Dimensions
- Wheelbase: 2,725 mm (107.3 in)
- Length: 4,800 mm (189.0 in)
- Width: 1,820 mm (71.7 in)
- Height: 1,472 mm (58.0 in)

The second generation B70 was launched onto the market in May 2014. It is based on the same platform as the second generation Mazda6. The engines of the second generation B70 includes a 108 kW 2.0 litre (LF) engine and a 120 kW 2.3 litre (L3) engine. The engine options were dropped in 2012 and replaced by an 1.8 litre (ET3) engine shared with the B50 developed by FAW.

The design of the second generation B70 was also done by Giorgetto Giugiaro.

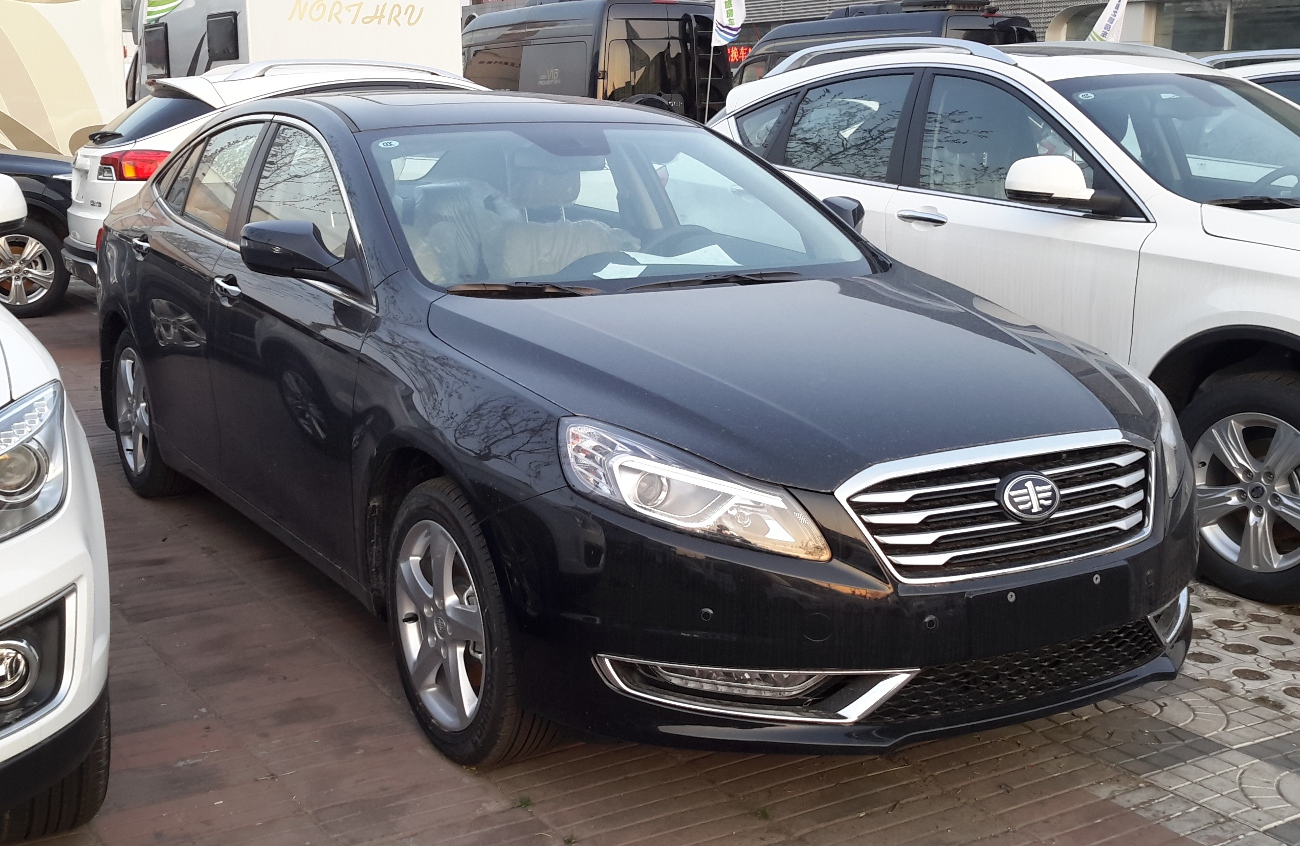
Bestune B70 II

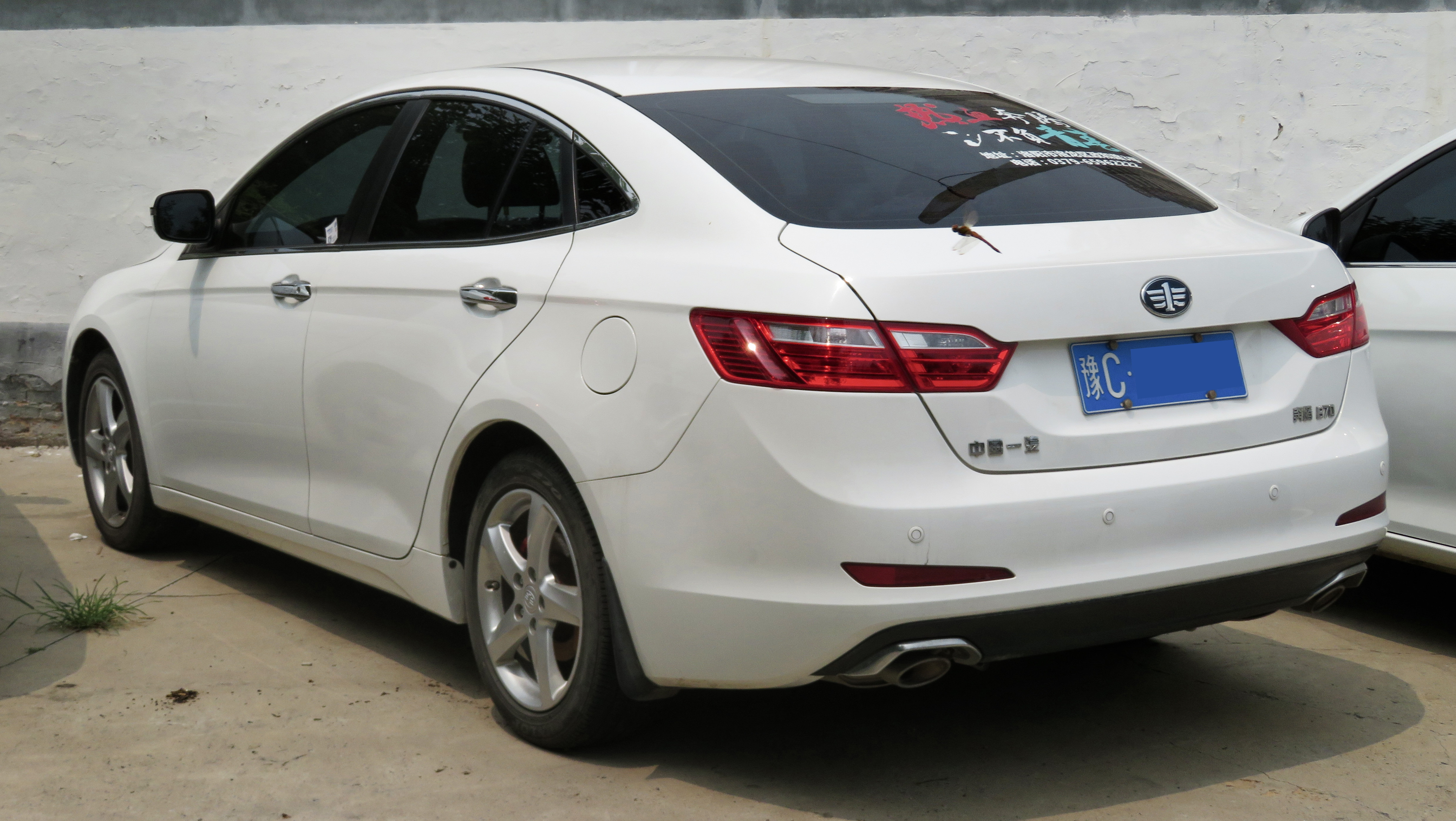
Rear view

=== Bestune B70 RS ===
A RS variant of the second generation B70 was also available with the engine being a Volkswagen-sourced 1.8-litre turbo engine with 139 kW (186 hp; 189 PS) and 235 N⋅m (173 lb⋅ft; 24 kg⋅m) via the FAW-Volkswagen joint venture.

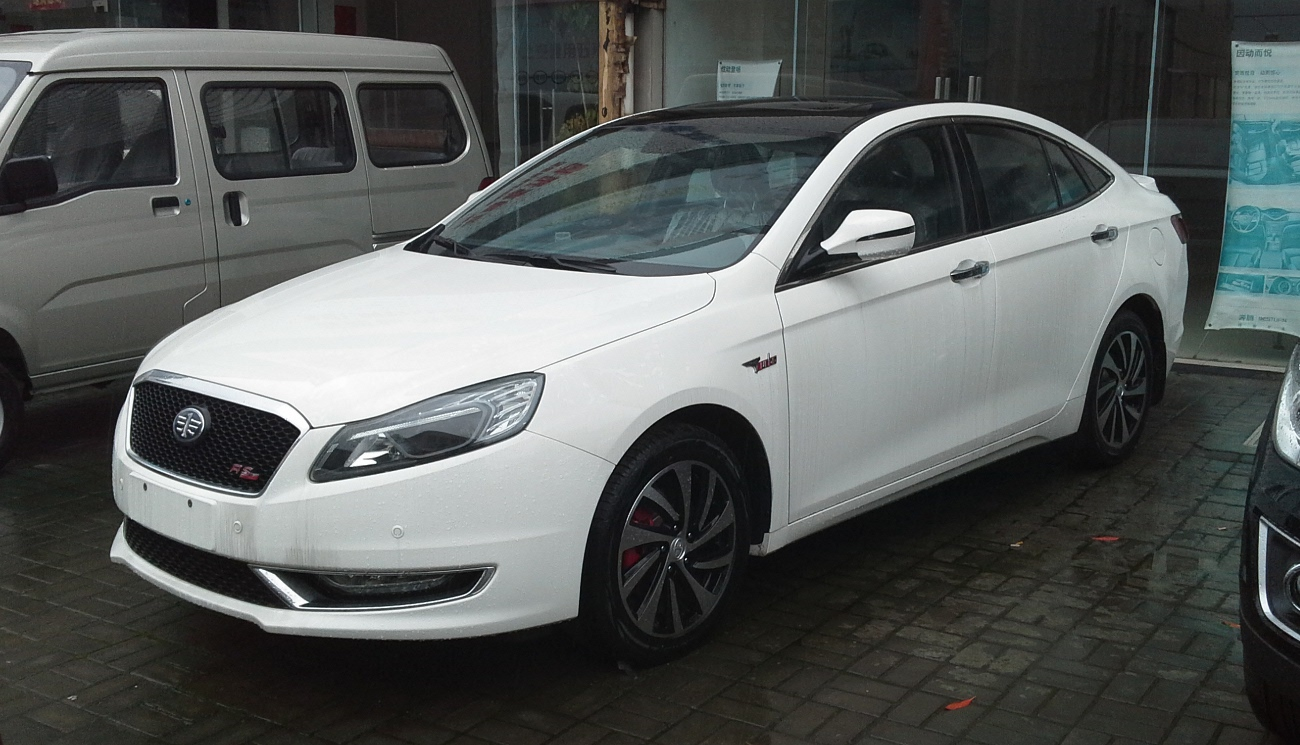
Bestune B70 RS II

== Third generation (2020) ==
Third generation
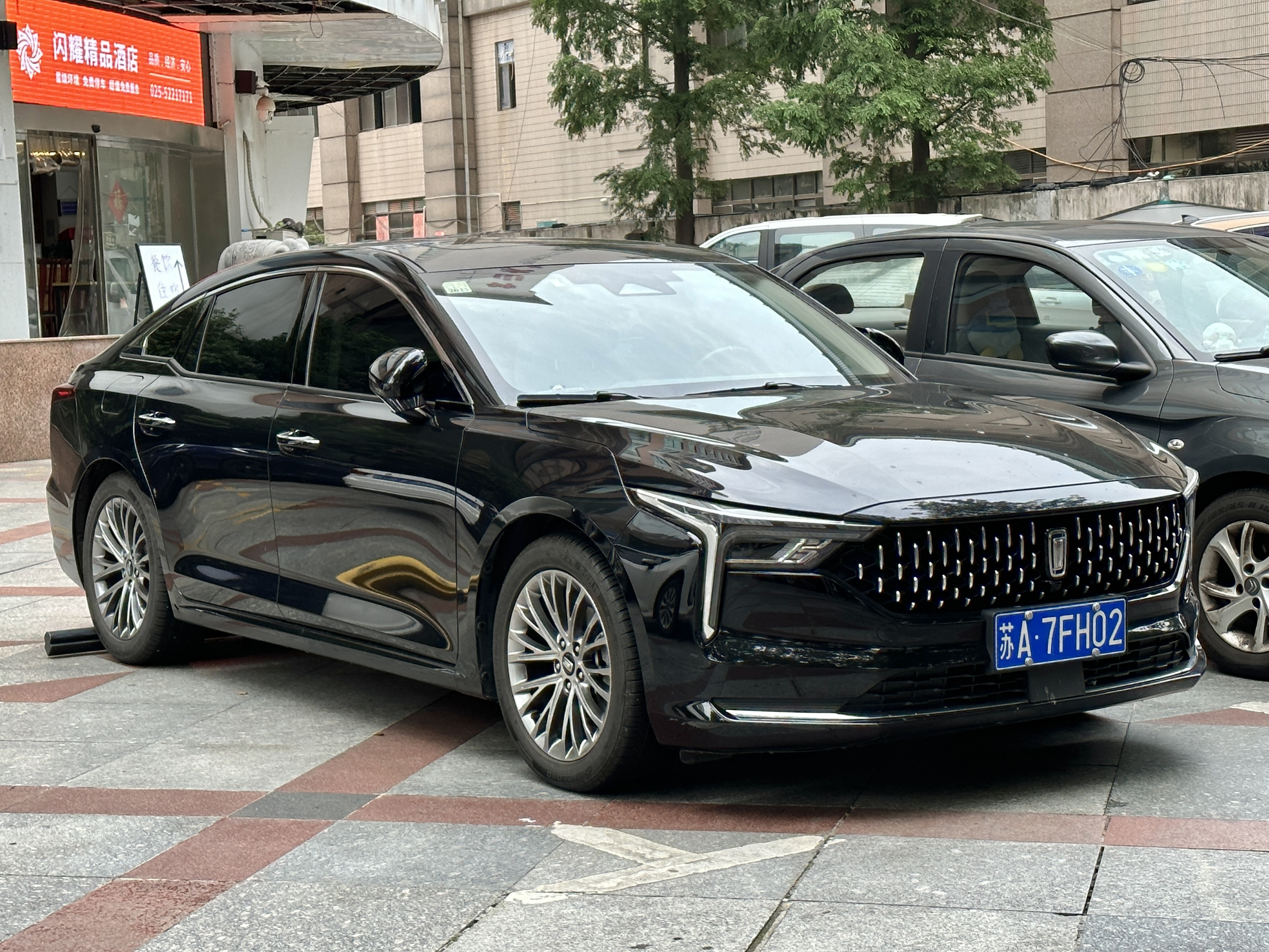
- Bestune B70 III (pre-facelift)

Overview
- Model code: D357
- Production: 2020–2026 (China); 2022–present (export)
- Assembly: China: Changchun

Body and chassis
- Layout: Front engine, front-wheel drive

Powertrain
- Engine: Petrol: 1.5 L CA4GB15TD-30 turbo I4; 2.0 L CA4GB20TD-36 turbo I4
- Transmission: 6-speed manual; 7-speed DCT

Dimensions
- Wheelbase: 2,800 mm (110.2 in)
- Length: 4,810 mm (189.4 in) (pre-facelift); 4,855 mm (191.1 in) (facelift)
- Width: 1,840 mm (72.4 in)
- Height: 1,455 mm (57.3 in)
- Curb weight: 1,440–1,545 kg (3,175–3,406 lb) (pre-facelift); 1,440–1,540 kg (3,175–3,395 lb) (facelift)

Chronology
- Predecessor: Bestune B90

The third generation B70 is a 5-door liftback sedan that debuted during the 2020 Beijing Auto Show. The third generation B70 is the first car to be built on FAW's FMA architecture. According to FAW, FMA stands for FAW Modular Architecture, while "F" also stands for both "Forward" and "Future".

The third generation B70 sedan is equipped with a 126 kW (169 hp; 171 PS) 1.5-litre turbo engine, and the engine pairs with either a six-speed automatic transmission or a six-speed manual transmission.

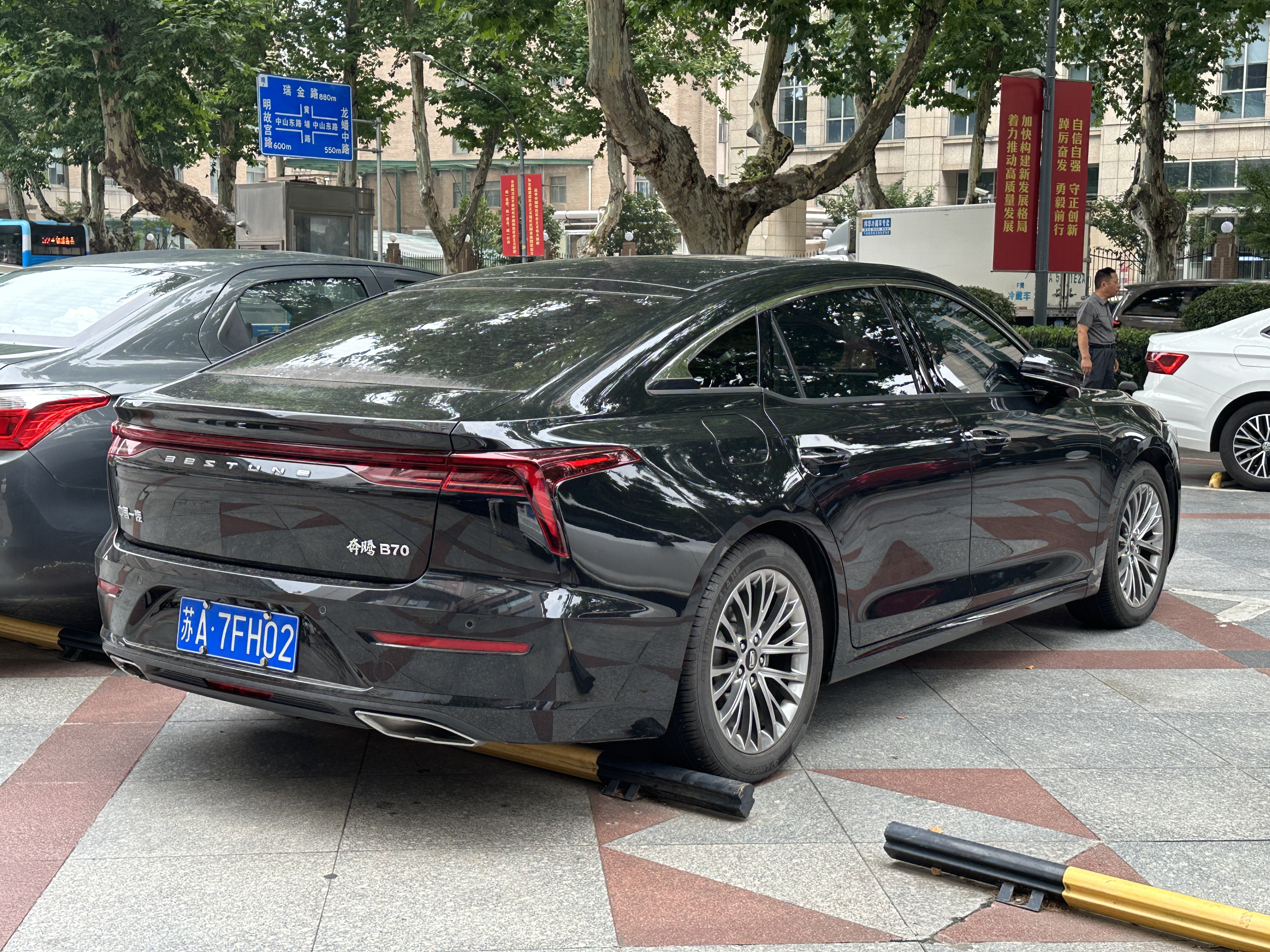
Rear view

=== 2023 (facelift) ===
In November 2023, the Bestune was launched the facelift of third generation B70. The new model has discontinued the previous 1.5-liter turbocharged engine paired with a 7-speed dual-clutch transmission powertrain. The entire lineup comes equipped with a 2.0-liter turbocharged engine and an Aisin 6-speed automatic transmission.

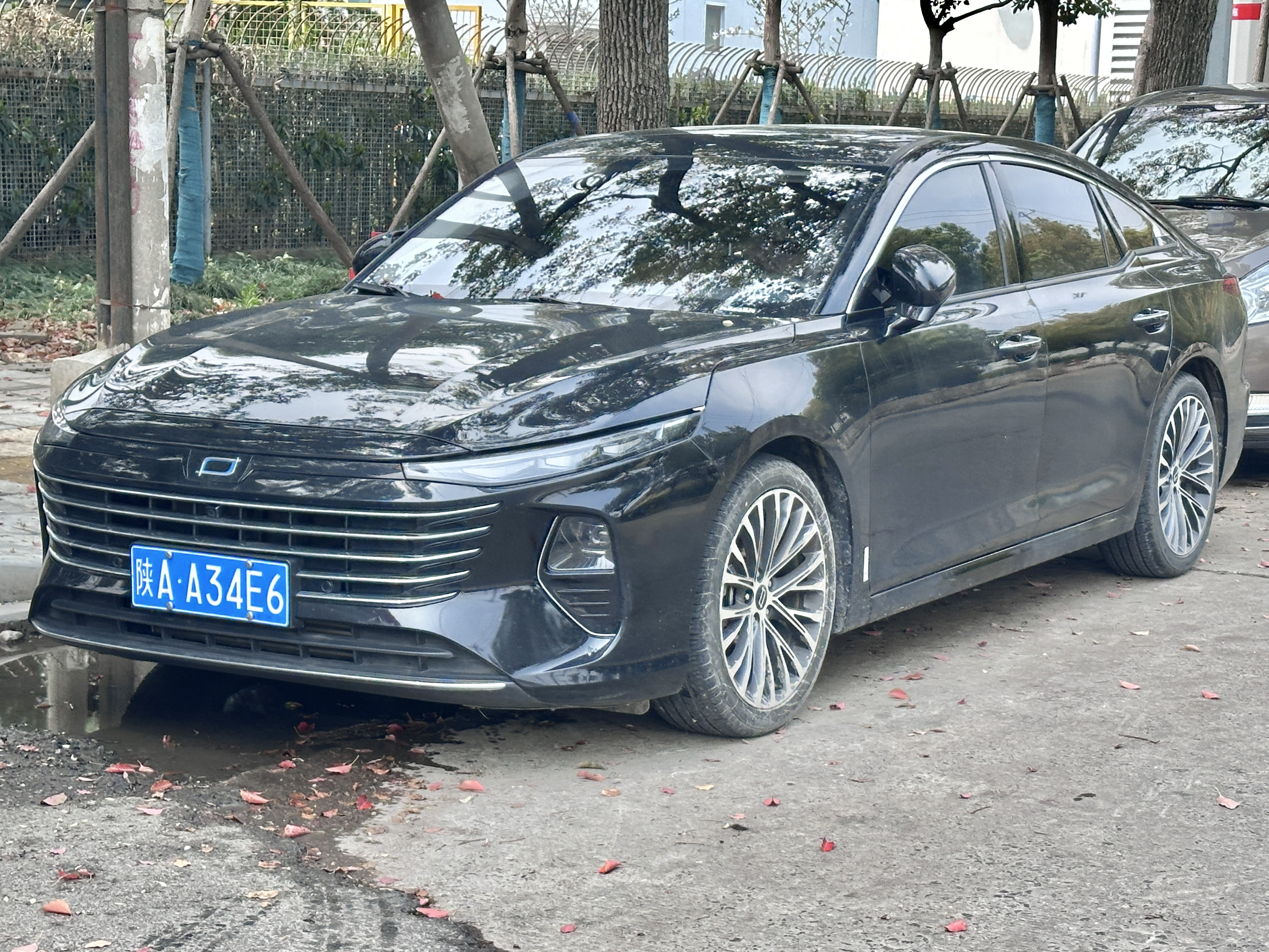
Bestune B70 III 2023 (facelift)

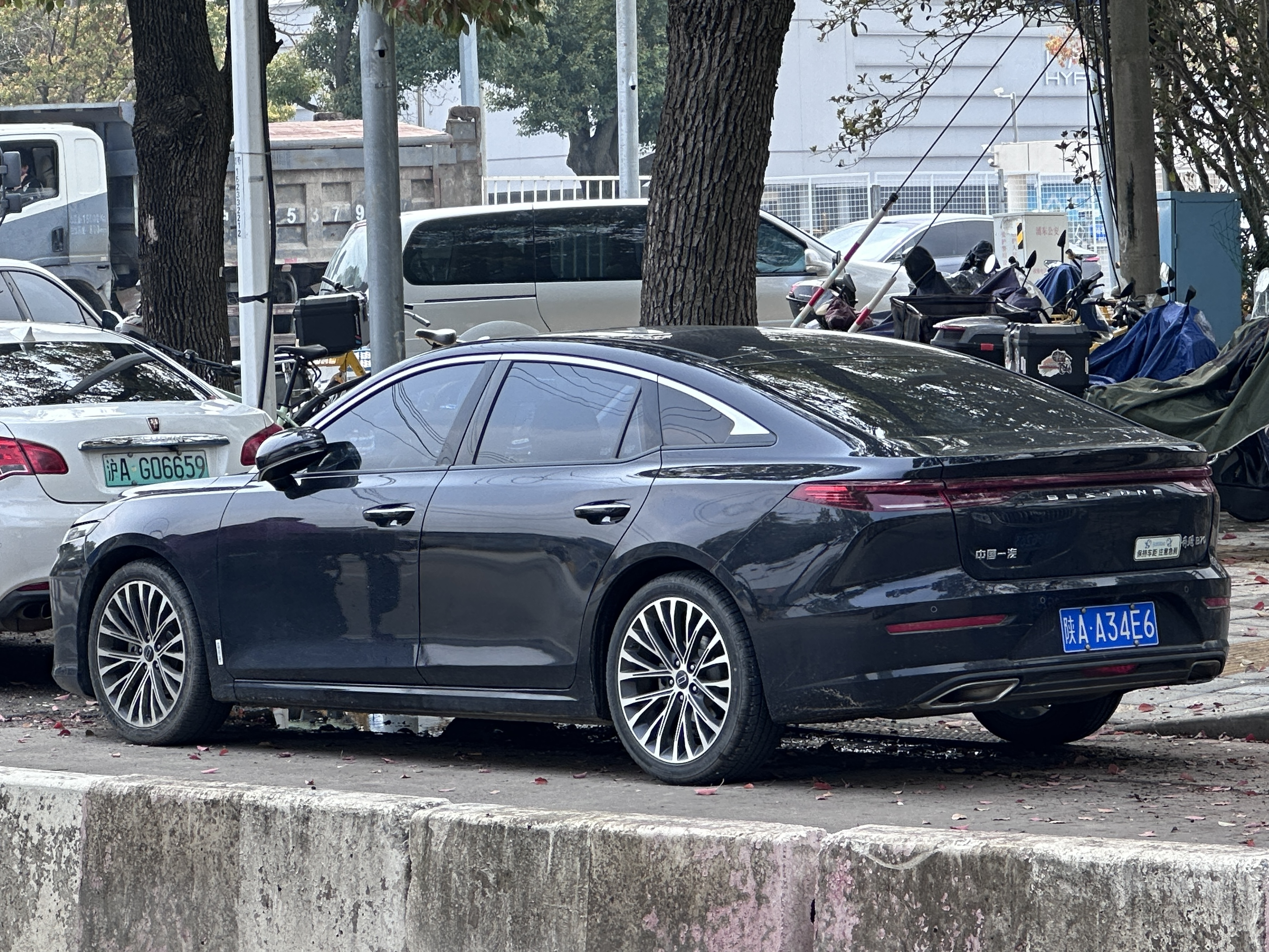
Rear view

== Sales ==
Year	China
2023	40,506
2024	41,699
2025	15,441
