= Briggs Automotive Company =

British automobile manufacturing company

Briggs Automotive Company (BAC) Limited
- Type: Private
- Industry: Automotive
- Founded: 4 March 2009; 17 years ago
- Founders: Neill Briggs; Ian Briggs
- Headquarters: Liverpool, United Kingdom
- Key people: Mike Flewitt (Chairman)
- Products: BAC Mono; BAC Mono R
- Number of employees: 30 (2021)
- Website: bac-mono.com

Briggs Automotive Company (BAC) Limited is a British car manufacturer that created Mono, a road-legal sports car with only one seat. BAC is based in the city of Liverpool, United Kingdom, Mono cars are exported to 47 countries.

== Background ==
Briggs Automotive Company (BAC) was founded by brothers Neill (Director of Product Development) and Ian Briggs (design director) in 2009. The Briggs brothers consulted for car brands including Mercedes, Porsche, Bentley and Ford on design and engineering projects, until they decided to expand their creative potential with a product from scratch.

The result was the BAC Mono, a lightweight, single-seater, open-top, road-legal sports car.

The first BAC Mono was produced in 2011 and made its inaugural public appearance at the Retro Classics show in Stuttgart, Germany.

== BAC Mono ==
BAC Mono
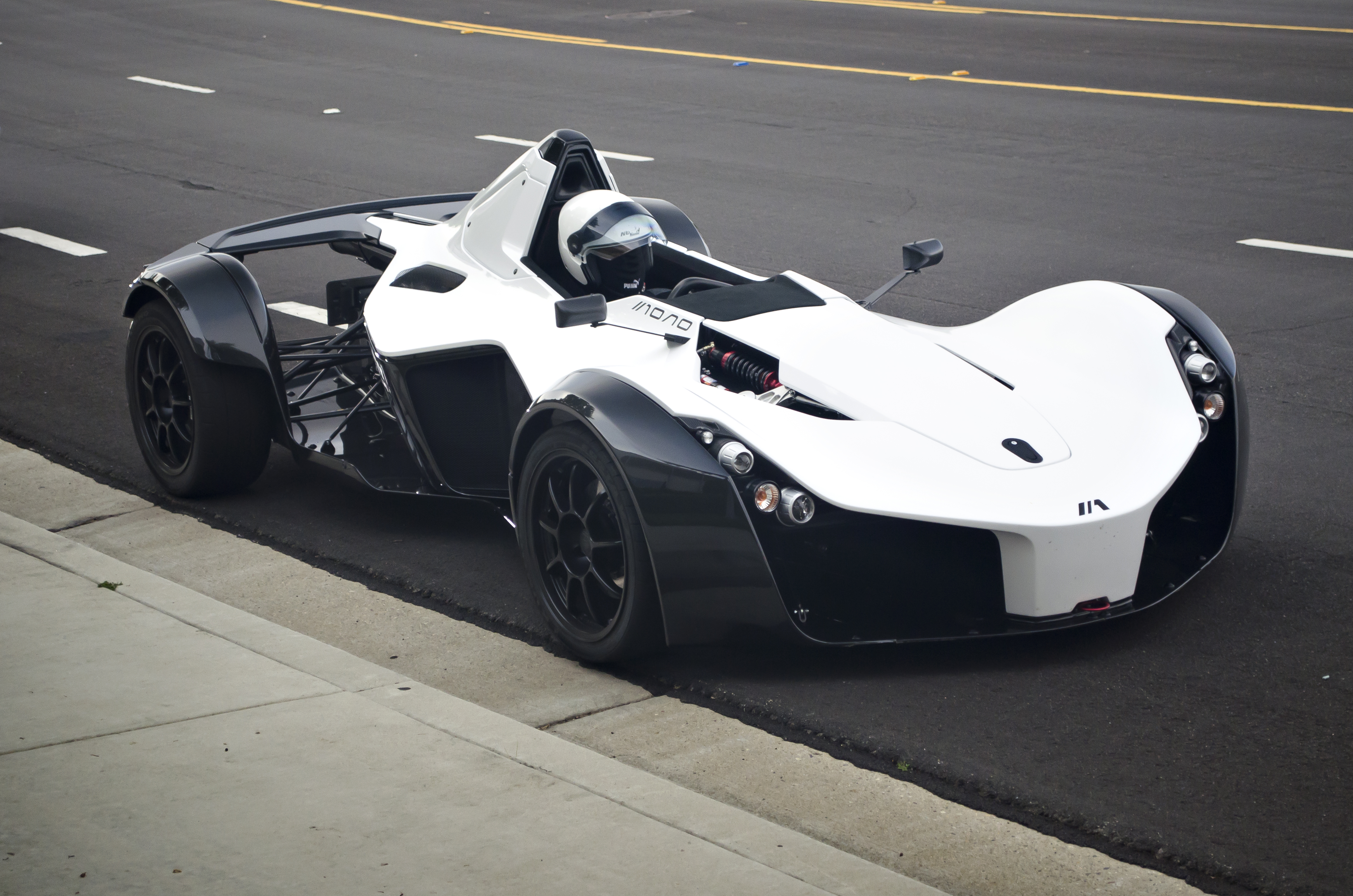

Overview
- Manufacturer: Briggs Automotive Company
- Production: 2011–present

Body and chassis
- Layout: RMR

Powertrain
- Engine: 2.3 L (2261 cc) Cosworth Duratec Straight-four engine (2011–2015); 2.5-litre Mountune Racing Duratec I4 (2015–present)
- Electric motor: Fuel-cell powered (Mono FCEV)
- Transmission: 6-speed sequential transmission

Dimensions
- Wheelbase: 2,565 mm (101.0 in)
- Length: 3,952 mm (155.6 in)
- Width: 1,800 mm (70.9 in)
- Height: 1,110 mm (43.7 in)
- Kerb weight: 540 kg (1,190 lb) (2011–2015); 580 kg (1,279 lb) (2015–present)

The first iteration of the BAC Mono was originally powered by a Ford Duratec 2.3-litre four-cylinder naturally aspirated petrol engine, heavily modified by Cosworth, to produce 280 bhp (209 kW) at 7,700 rpm. It is mounted longitudinally and mated to an electronically controlled, paddle-shift, six-speed sequential Hewland transmission with a limited-slip differential.

The Mono weighs 540 kg (1,190 lb), resulting in a power-to-weight ratio of 518 bhp per tonne. It delivered performance figures of 0–62 mph (0–100 km/h) in 2.8 seconds and a top speed of 170 mph (274 km/h). BAC aimed for an equal weight distribution, 48/52 front/rear, and as low of a centre of gravity as possible when designing the Mono.

The car was constructed in carbon fibre with a tubular steel driver safety cell, complete with an FIA-compliant rollover protection system - similar in concept to a DTM race car. The rose-jointed, aero-profiled pushrod suspension featured adjustable dampers that can be altered based on driving on either the road or track.

The Mono's design is said to be inspired by a science fiction aesthetic and also the robot in Bjork's music video for the song "All Is Full of Love".

In 2015, the Cosworth engine was replaced by a 2.5-litre Mountune Racing unit developing 305 bhp (227 kW) at 8,000 rpm. There were a number of further improvements under the skin to optimise performance, while wider chassis allowed for more room for the driver in the cockpit. The 2015 model year BAC Mono weighed 580 kg, resulting in a power-to-weight ratio of 525 bhp per tonne.

=== Performance achievements ===
- Second-fastest Top Gear Power Lap of all time (fastest overall on road-legal tyres): 1 minute, 14.3 seconds (July 2013)
- Production car lap record of 1:54.00 at the Hungaroring
- Autocar's Fastest rear-wheel-drive car in the world accelerating from 0-60mph in 2018: 2.7 seconds
- Production car lap record of 36.5 seconds at the Roskilde Ring (Denmark)
- Production car lap record at the Anglesey Circuit by evo magazine: 1:07.70 (2016, fastest car ever tested by the magazine)
- Production car lap record at Circuit Zolder, Belgium (October 2017, 1:37.10)
- Goodwood Festival of Speed 2018 Supercar Shootout Champions (July 2018, 49.13 seconds – fastest ever Supercar Shootout time)
- Production car lap record at Sepang International Circuit, Malaysia (December 2018, 2:14.617)
- Production car lap record at Autodromo Querétaro, Mexico (June 2019)
- Production car lap record at Aerautodromo di Modena, Italy (September 2019)
- Production car lap record at the 3.7 km Anneau du Rhin circuit, France (August 2020)
- Production car lap record for Mono R at Red Bull Ring, Austria (October 2021)
- Mono R: The fastest car on the evo Leaderboard at Anglesey Circuit, Wales (October 2022)

=== Awards ===
- GQ Track Day Car of the Year 2012
- Top Gear Stig's Car of the Year 2011
- Steve Sutcliffe's "Car of the Year"
- Xcar Best Drive 2012–2013" Editor's Choice
- Northern Automotive Alliance Innovation Company of the Year 2012
- Merseyside Innovation Award Overall Winner 2014
- Sunday Times Fast Track 100 Ones to Watch 2015
- Northern Automotive Alliance (NAA) Awards 2016: International Trade and Logistics Excellence
- Department for International Trade Export Champions – North West 2017, 2018
- TopGear Magazine Best in the World for Selfish Sundays (2017)
- TopGear Magazine Top 50 Cars of All Time (300th edition, 2017)
- Northern Automotive Alliance (NAA) Awards 2017 – People & Skills Excellence
- Northern Automotive Alliance (NAA) Awards 2018 – Marketing Excellence
- Autocar Magazine review for BAC Mono : '4.5 Stars' – December 2018
- CAR Magazine review: '5 Stars' for BAC Mono– February 2019
- Northern Automotive Alliance (NAA) Awards 2019
- GQ Track Car Of The Year Award for BAC Mono R – February 2021
- Top Gear review: 9/10 for BAC Mono R- July 2022
- Northern Automotive Alliance (NAA) Awards 2022 – International Trade Award
- evo (magazine) BAC Mono R 2022 review: '5 Stars' - October 2022
- Northern Automotive Alliance (NAA) Awards 2023 – Company of the year Award & International Trade Award

== BAC Mono R ==
BAC Mono R
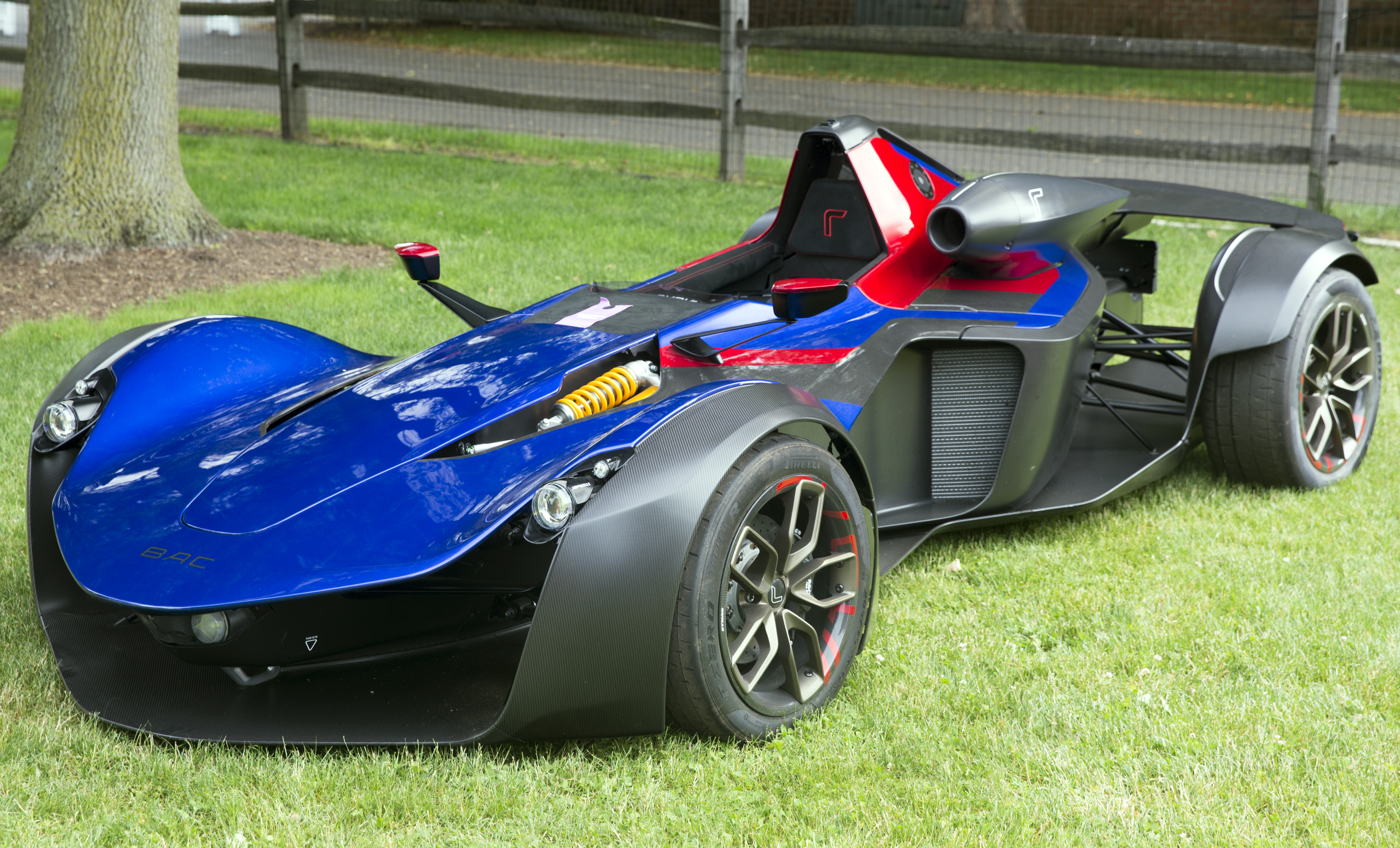

Overview
- Manufacturer: Briggs Automotive Company
- Production: 2019-present

Powertrain
- Engine: 2.5 L Mountune Duratec I4
- Power output: 256 kW (343 bhp)
- Transmission: 6-speed sequential transmission

Dimensions
- Curb weight: 555 kg (1,224 lb)

On 4 July 2019, BAC launched the limited-edition BAC Mono R at the Goodwood Festival of Speed. Mono R is a higher-performance, lighter and more advanced new generation of the original BAC Mono. The Mono R is 38 bhp (28 kW) more powerful and 25 kg lighter than the standard Mono, at 256 kW (343 bhp) and 555 kg which equates to a power-to-weight ratio of 461 W/kg (618 bhp/t).

=== Design ===
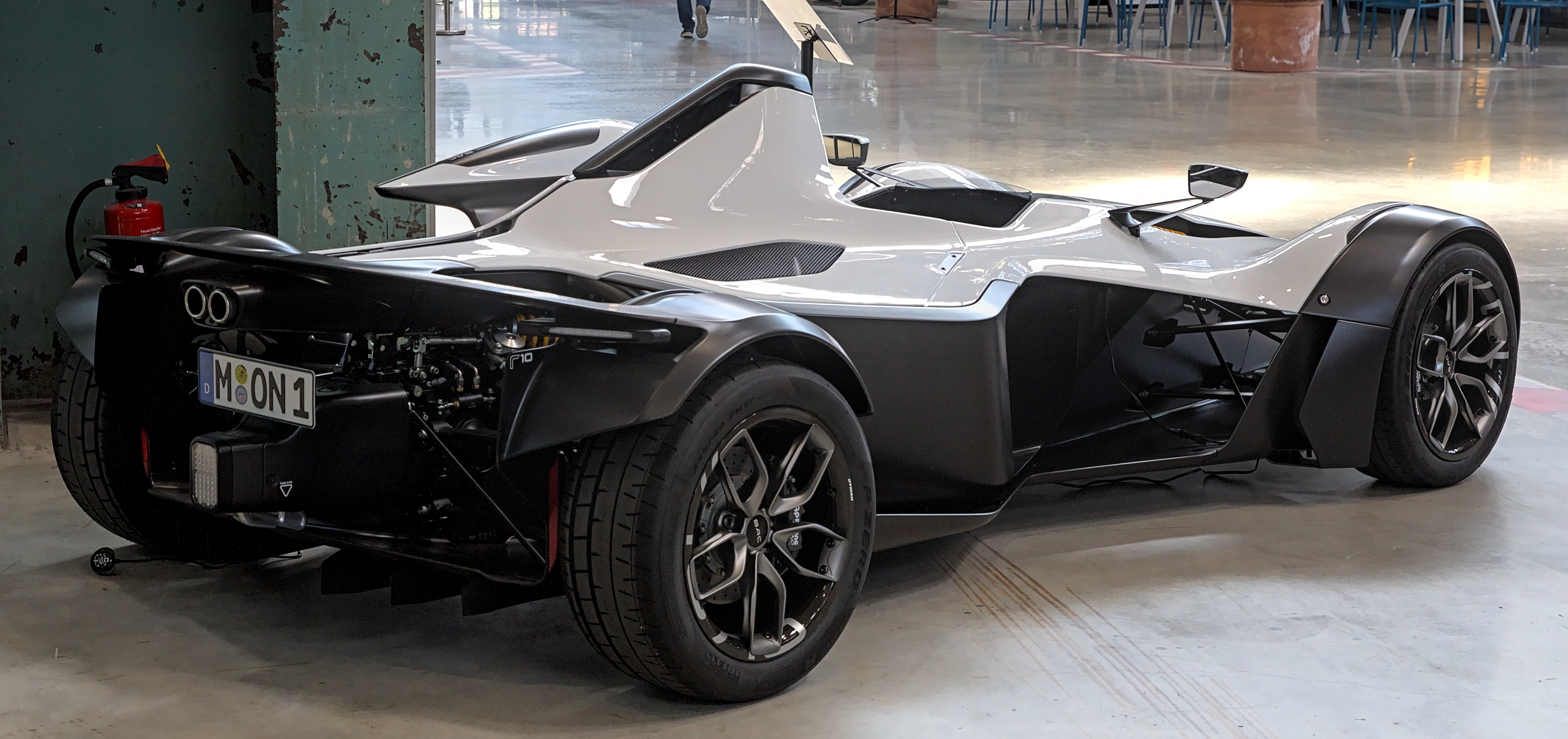
Rear view

The Mono R has main beam LED headlights centrally mounted on the nose. The vehicle has a 20 mm reduction in overall height and a 25 mm increase in length over the standard Mono.

=== Power ===
The Mono R's 2.5-litre, four-cylinder engine, co-developed with long-standing engine partner Mountune, has power increased by 38 bhp over the Mono to deliver 256 kW (343 bhp). Starting with the Ford Duratec engine, BAC and Mountune increased the cylinder bore size and reduced the new billet crankshaft stroke to optimize power and torque delivery and increased the redline from 7,800 rpm to 8,800 rpm.

The new Formula-inspired ram-air inlet system provides pressurized air into an all-new throttle body and cylinder head system to further increase power, plus a higher-spec, drive-by-wire motor allows for quicker throttle response. As a result, the bespoke Mountune engine now offers a specific output of 102 kW/L (137 bhp/L).

=== Innovation ===
The Mono R is the first production car fully incorporating the use of graphene-enhanced carbon fibre in every body panel. Using the material enhances the structural properties of the fibre to make panels stronger and lighter, increasing toughness and improving thermal properties. This came as a result of an APC-funded Research & Development project into the production-readiness of graphene.

In 2022, the company announced a feasibility study into the use of hydrogen in powering the Mono, alongside clean tech company Viritech. The e-Mono study integrated a fuel cell powertrain into an existing Mono chassis, whilst minimising added weight. This resulted in the e-Mono completing a simulated lap of Silverstone Circuit two seconds faster than the combustion-engined Mono R.

== Lightweight technology ==
BAC conducts research and development into lightweight automotive technology, especially for the use of graphene in the car body.

Combining graphene within carbon fibre enhances the structural properties of carbon to result in fewer sheets being needed to meet functional performance targets. With BAC Mono and Mono R panels, the addition of graphene ensured panels required two sheets of carbon fibre, rather than three.

A panel set that weighed 41 kg before the use of graphene weighed 32 kg after use of graphene.

In 2020, BAC was awarded UK Government funding to undertake its latest nano element R&D project, exploring the use of niobium in the structure of BAC Mono. The project is sponsored by CBMM, a manufacturer of niobium products.

== Mono Owners' Club ==
BAC founded the Mono Owners' Club in 2018.

== See also ==
- List of car manufacturers of the United Kingdom
