= Mazda CX-7 =

Mid-size crossover SUV

Mazda CX-7 (ER)
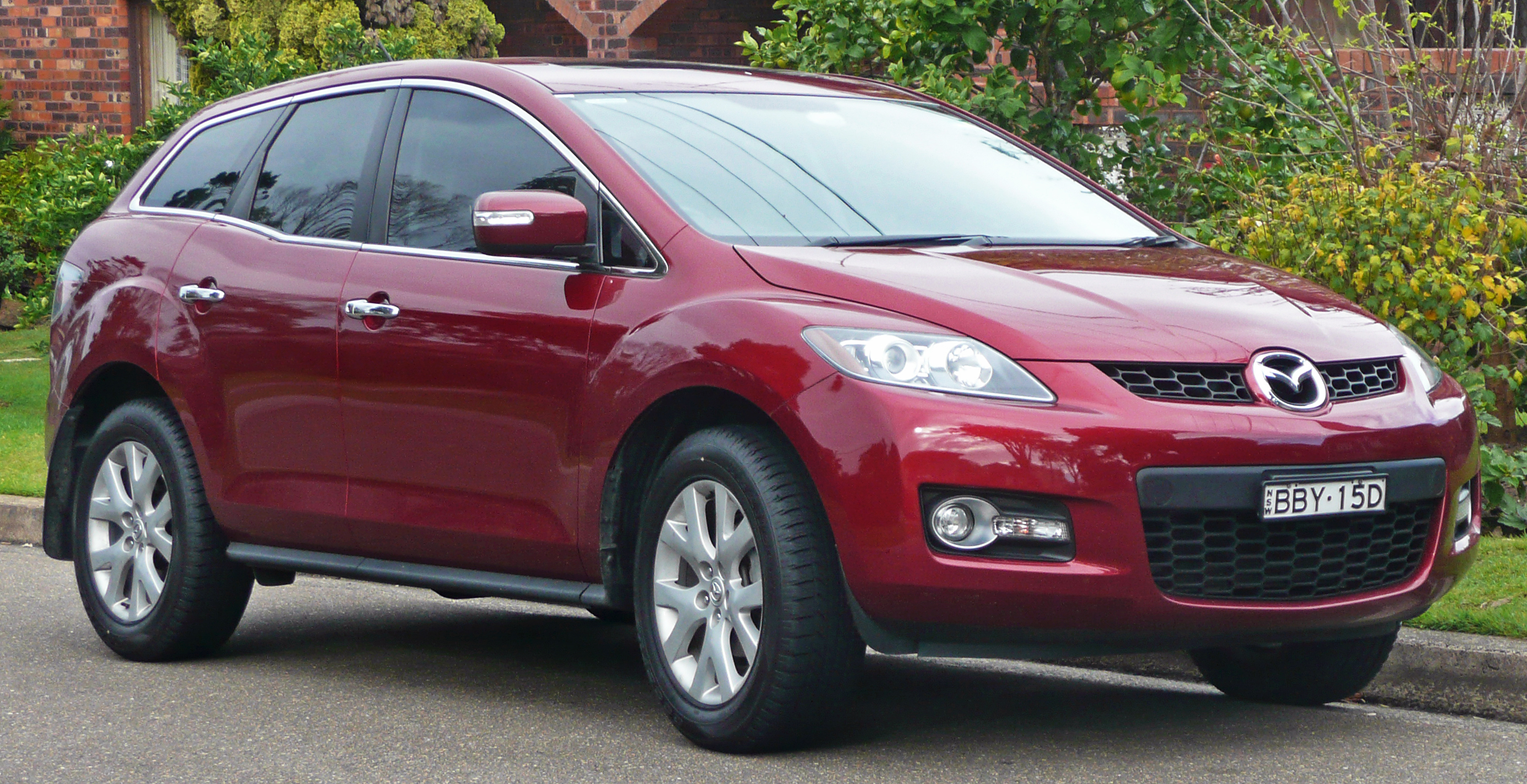

Overview
- Manufacturer: Mazda
- Model code: ER
- Production: February 2006 – August 2012
- Assembly: Japan: Hiroshima (Hiroshima Plant); China: Changchun (FAW Mazda)
- Designer: Moray Callum; Koizumi Iwao (2003)

Body and chassis
- Class: Mid-size crossover SUV (D)
- Body style: 5-door SUV
- Layout: Front-engine, front-wheel-drive; Front-engine, all-wheel-drive
- Platform: Ford C1 platform

Powertrain
- Engine: 2.3 L MZR L3-VDT DISI turbo I4 (gasoline); 2.5 L MZR L5-VE I4 (gasoline); 2.2 L MZR-CD I4 (diesel)
- Transmission: 6-speed F21 automatic; 5-speed automatic 6-speed manual

Dimensions
- Wheelbase: 2,750 mm (108.3 in)
- Length: 4,676–4,681 mm (184.1–184.3 in)
- Width: 1,872 mm (73.7 in)
- Height: 1,646 mm (64.8 in)
- Curb weight: 1,782 kg (3,929 lb)

Chronology
- Predecessor: Mazda Tribute
- Successor: Mazda CX-5

The Mazda CX-7 is a mid-size crossover SUV from Mazda, and is the production version of the MX-Crossport concept car. It was shown publicly for the first time at the 2006 LA Auto Show in January. Production officially began on February 20, 2006 in Mazda's Ujina #2 factory in Hiroshima, and went on sale in April 2006 as a 2007 model. The CX-7 was Mazda's first mid-size SUV since the Navajo was discontinued in 1994, although the CX-7 is considered more of a 'Soft Roader'.

The mid-size CX-7 was positioned below the larger three-row Mazda CX-9; the vehicles did not share platforms. Instead, it used the Ford C1 platform that underpinned the Ford Focus and Mazda3. The CX-7 was discontinued in August 2012 in favor of the new Mazda CX-5; as the compact CX-5 has similar interior space to the mid-size CX-7.

== Specifications ==
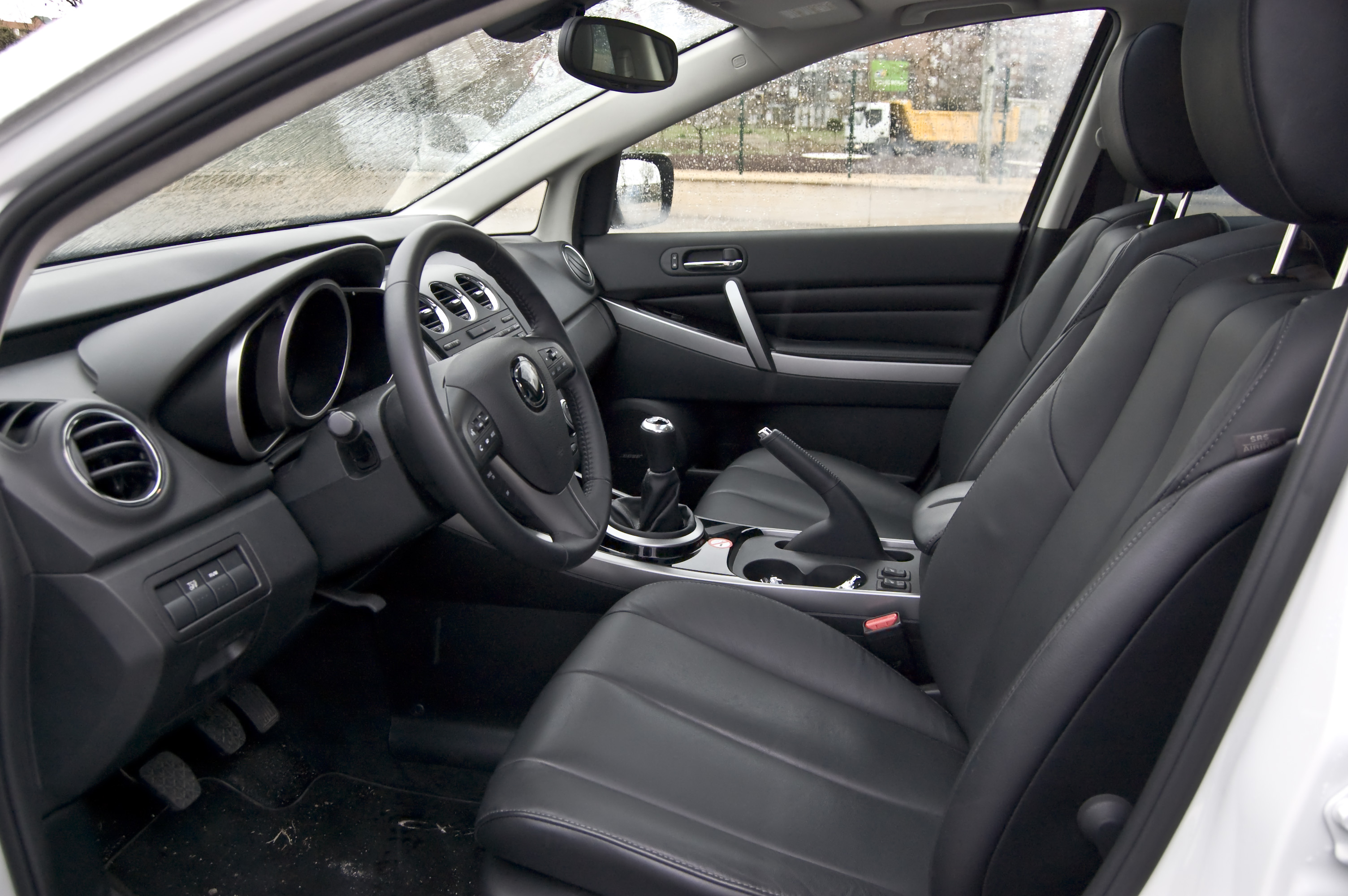
Interior (facelift)

=== Engine and transmission ===
Power comes from the same 2.3 L inline-4 MZR L3-VDT DISI engine used in the Mazdaspeed3 and Mazdaspeed6 coupled with a six-speed Aisin F21 automatic transmission, and tuned to produce 244 hp or 182 kW (Australian model 175 kW) at 5000 rpm and 258 lb·ft (350 N·m) of torque at a low 2500 rpm, 99% of the maximum torque is available to 5000 rpm.

The MZR 2.3L DISI turbo engine was retuned in the North American specification CX-7 to deliver torque at a lower rpm for less turbo lag off the line, at the cost of power. This was achieved thanks to a redesigned, smaller K04 turbocharger. United Kingdom specification CX-7s featured the same, larger K04 turbocharger and transmission found in the Mazdaspeed line.

=== Suspension ===
The CX-7 shares the front suspension of the Mazda MPV minivan, and the rear suspension from the Mazda5.

=== Interior ===
The pre-facelift CX-7's steering wheel is shared with the third generation Mazda MX-5 and the Biante.

=== Model range, prices and features ===
The CX-7 features fully independent suspension, four wheel ventilated disc brakes with standard anti-lock brakes, electronic stability control, and traction control, and a choice of either front-wheel drive, or Mazda's Active Torque Split all-wheel drive system. With the Active Torque Split system, two computer controlled magnetic clutches feed up to 50% of the torque to the rear wheels on a slippery surface, to ensure a consistency of grip.

The Australian combined cycle official fuel economy is 11.5 L/100 km (25 mpg_{‑imp}; 20.5 mpg_{‑US}), similar to the Holden Captiva. But real world fuel economy is nearer to 18.0 L/100 km (15.7 mpg_{‑imp}; 13.1 mpg_{‑US}), as much or more than the Ford Territory.

As of the model of 2010, there are four trim levels (model), iSV, iSport, sTouring, and sGrand Touring in ascending equipment levels. Touring and Grand Touring models are available with all wheel drive and are offered with the 2.3L turbocharged engines. SV and Sport trims come with a 2.5 L MZR L5-VE naturally aspirated DOHC inline four engine.

Canadian models included GS Front Wheel Drive, GS All Wheel Drive, GT Front Wheel Drive, GT All Wheel Drive. Australian models (AWD only) included "CX-7 Classic" Base trim and "CX-7 Luxury" upper trim. Models for the United Kingdom (AWD only) were not offered at the same time and included 2.3T and 2.2D 'Sport Tech'.

== Update ==
The front and rear exterior fascias were revised with the front adopting the larger five point grille design similar in appearance to the contemporary RX-8, MX-5 and Mazda3/Axela.

The interior gauges were revised, with blackout meters that featured three dimensional dials, a 3.5 inch super twisted nematic (STN) monochrome and 4.1 inch thin film transistor (TFT) colour Multi Information Display (MID), (positioned at the top of the instrument panel), Bluetooth compatibility, and a Blind Spot Monitoring System.

The car was unveiled at the February 2009 Canadian International AutoShow. The diesel version included a manual transmission, and was sold in Europe from 2009 to 2012.

Pre-facelift styling

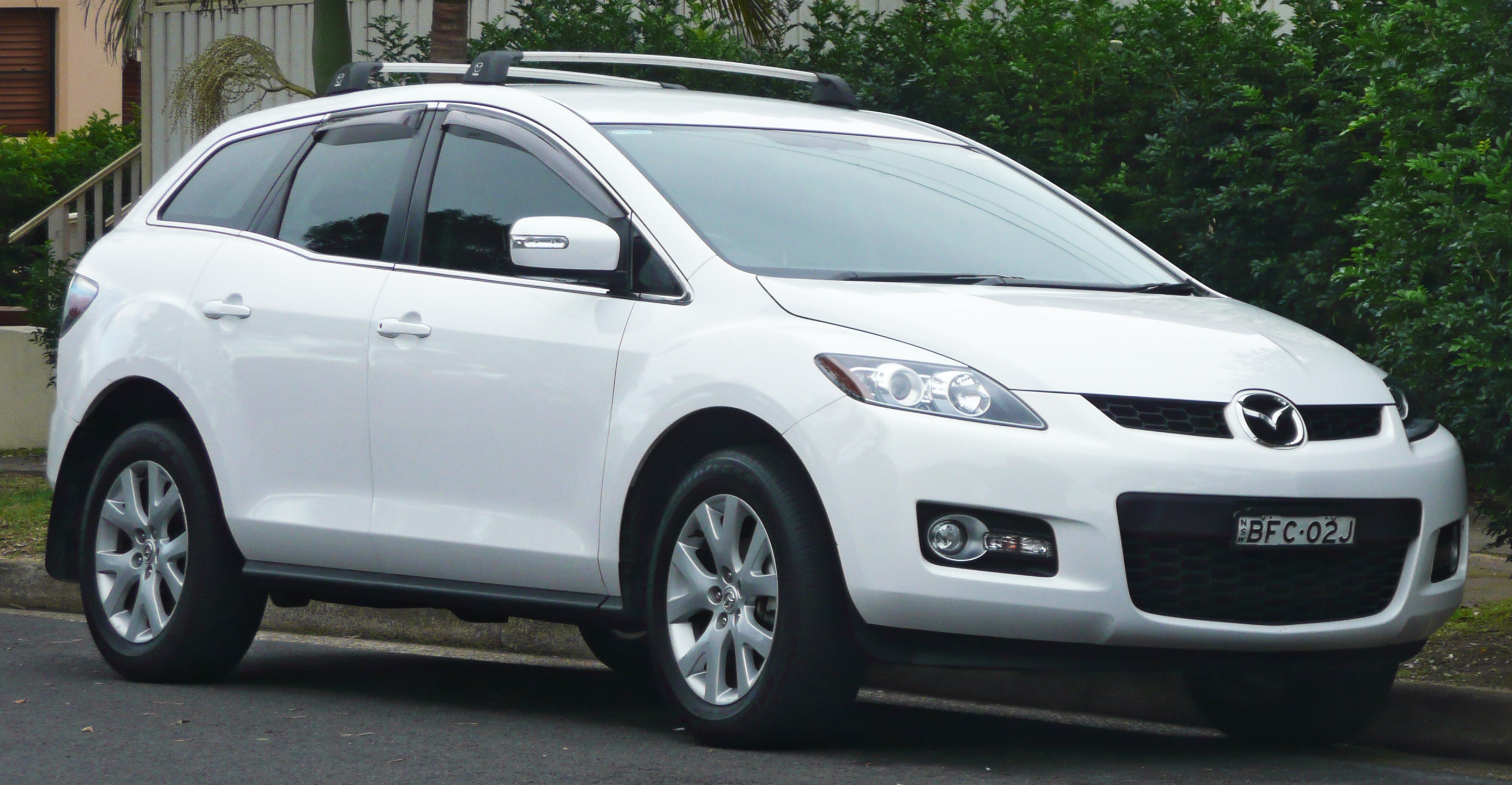
Front (Classic)

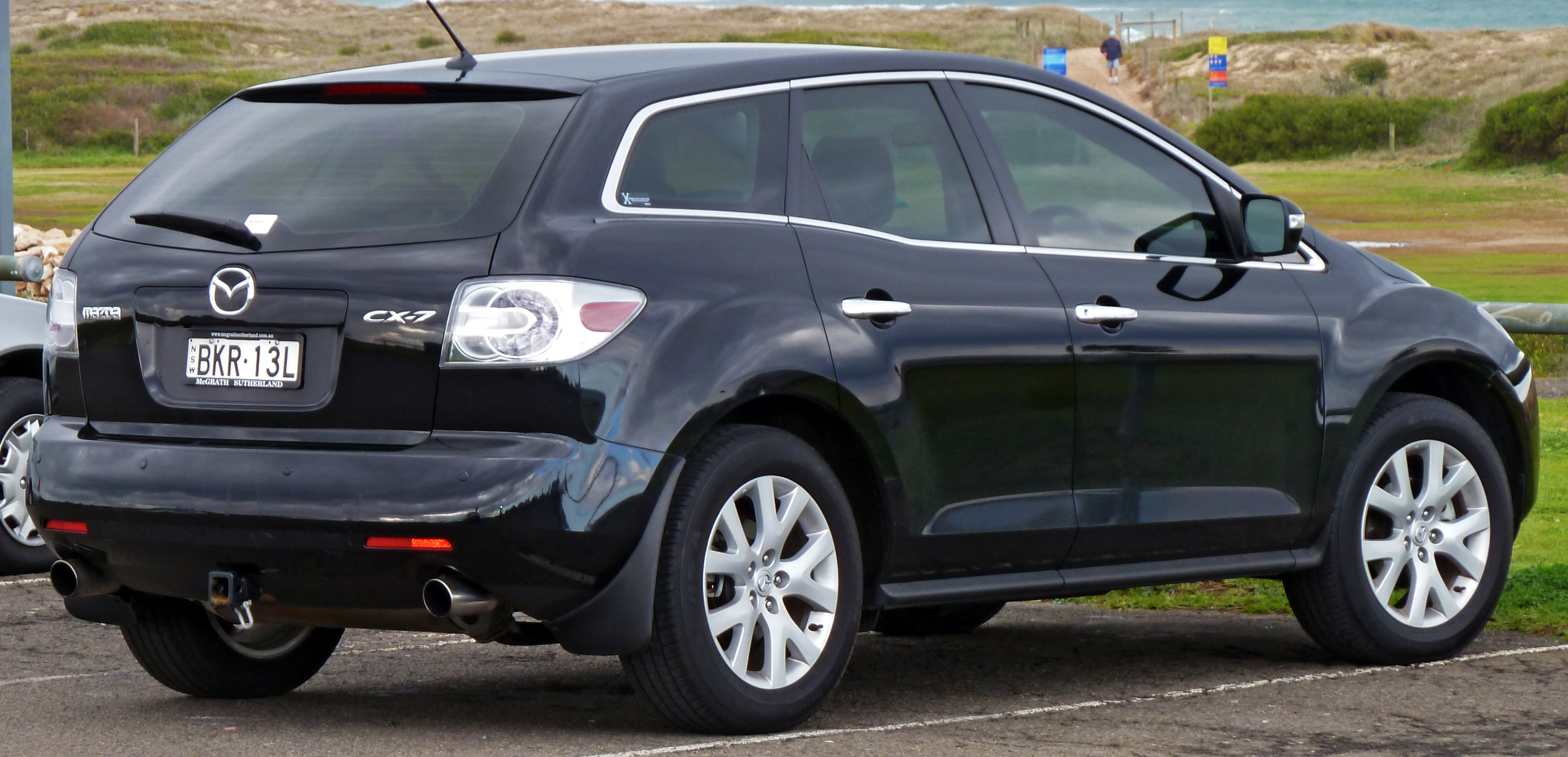
Rear (Luxury)

Post-facelift styling

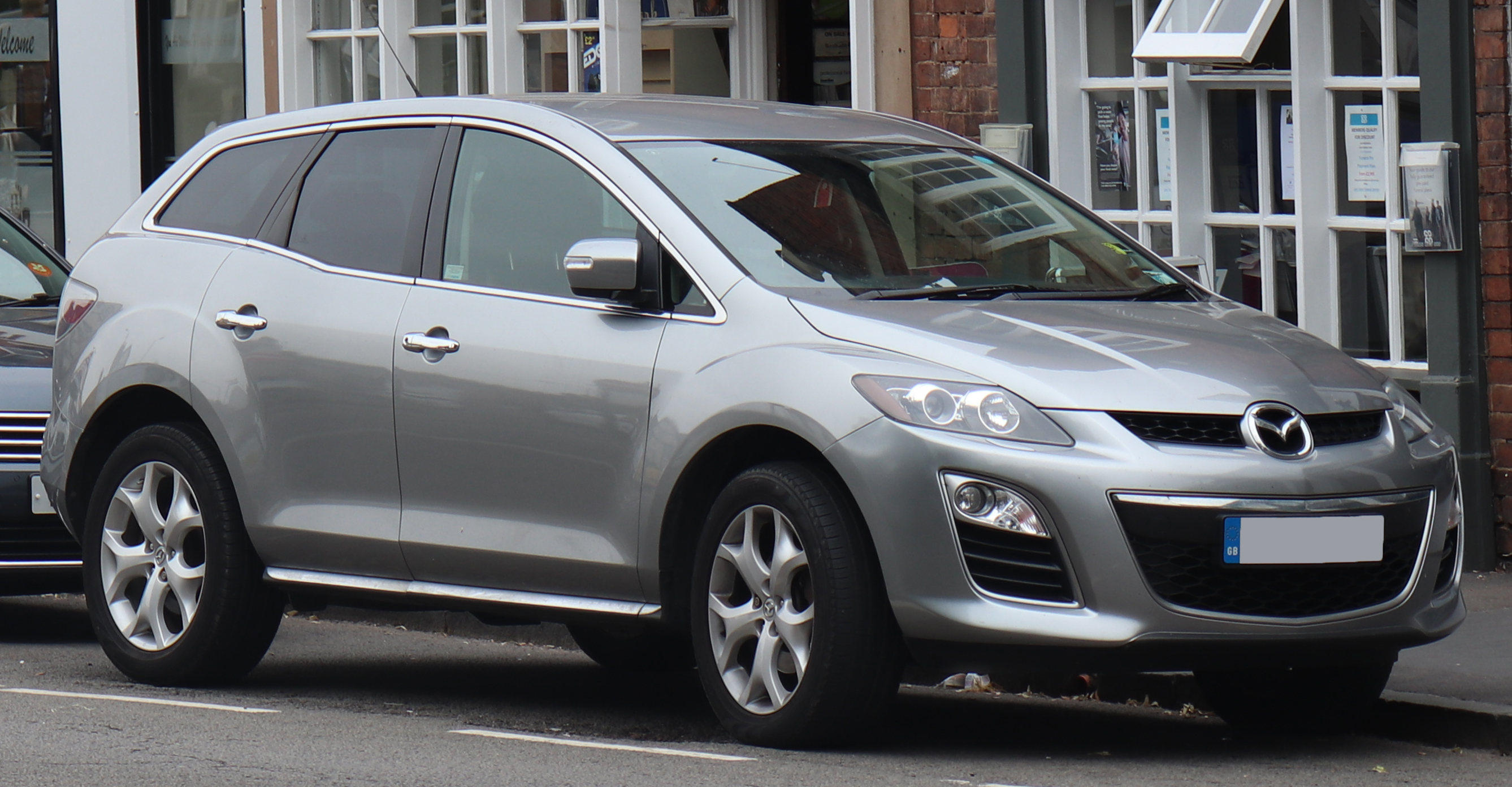
Front (facelift)

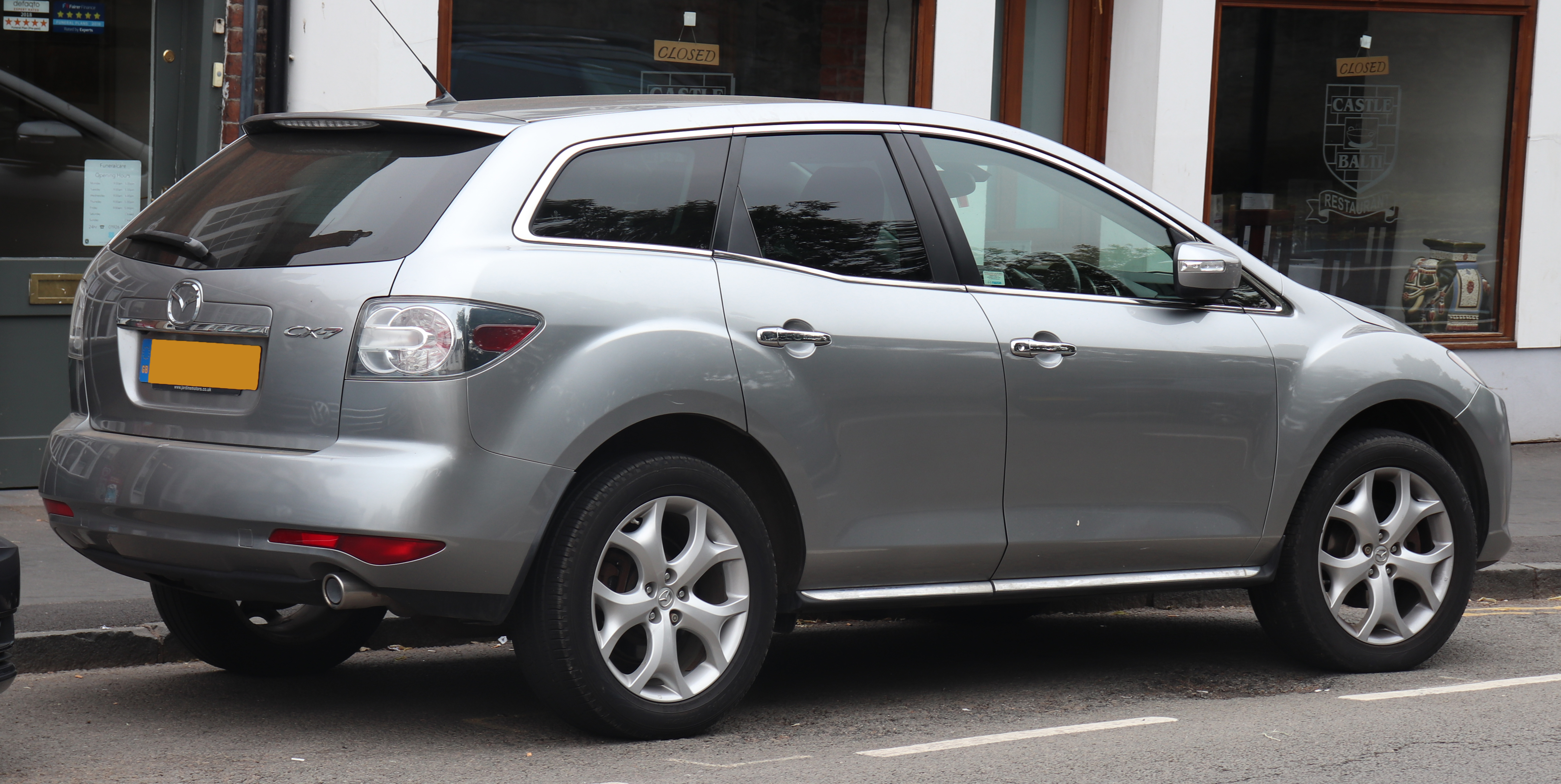
Rear (facelift)

== Technical specifications ==
Model	Years	Type	Power, torque@rpm
United States models
2.3 MZR DISI Turbo	2007–09	2,260 cc (2.26 L; 138 cu in) I4 turbo	256 bhp (191 kW) @5000, 280 lb⋅ft (380 N⋅m) @2750
i 2.5L MZR	2009–12	2,488 cc (2.488 L; 151.8 cu in) I4	161 bhp (120 kW) @6000, 161 lb⋅ft (218 N⋅m) @3500
s 2.3 MZR DISI Turbo	2009–12	2,260 cc (2.26 L; 138 cu in) I4 turbo	244 bhp (182 kW) @5000, 258 lb⋅ft (350 N⋅m) @2500
European models
2.3 MZR DISI Turbo	2007–09	2,260 cc (2.3 L; 137.9 cu in) I4 turbo	256 PS (188 kW; 252 bhp) @5000, 380 N⋅m (280 lb⋅ft)@2750
2.2 MZR-CD Turbo Diesel	2009–12	2,183 cc (2.183 L; 133.2 cu in) I4 turbo-diesel	170 PS (125 kW; 168 bhp) @3500, 400 N⋅m (295 lb⋅ft) @2000
Australian models
Classic	2009–12	2,488 cc (2.488 L; 151.8 cu in) I4	161 bhp (120 kW)@6000, 161 lb⋅ft (218 N⋅m)@3500
Classic Sports	2009–12	2,260 cc (2.26 L; 138 cu in) I4 turbo	235 bhp (175 kW)@5000, 258 lb⋅ft (350 N⋅m)@2500
Luxury Sports	2009–12	2,260 cc (2.26 L; 138 cu in) I4 turbo	235 bhp (175 kW)@5000, 258 lb⋅ft (350 N⋅m)@2500
Diesel Sports	2009–12	2,183 cc (2.183 L; 133.2 cu in) I4 turbo-diesel	170 bhp (127 kW)@3500, 295 lb⋅ft (400 N⋅m)@2000
Japanese models
2.3 MZR DISI Turbo	2009–12	2,260 cc (2.26 L; 138 cu in) I4 turbo	244 bhp (182 kW)@5000, 258 lb⋅ft (350 N⋅m)@2500

Engine choices include 2.5 litre MZR four cylinder engine, that produces 161 hp (120 kW) and 161 lb⋅ft (218 N⋅m) of torque and the same MZR 2.3L DISI Turbo engine from before. Transmission is a five speed automatic for the 2.5, and a six speed automatic for the 2.3 DISI Turbo engine.

== Safety ==
=== Euro NCAP ===
Euro NCAP test results for a model of 2010:

Euro NCAP test results Mazda CX-7 (2010)
Test	Points	%
Overall:	4 /5 stars	
Adult occupant:	27.5	76%
Child occupant:	38.7	79%
Pedestrian:	15.6	43%
Safety assist:	5	71%

=== NHTSA ===
NHTSA safety ratings for a model of 2007:

Test	Rating
Front driver side	5/5 stars
Front passenger side	5/5 stars
Side barrier (driver)	5/5 stars
side barrier (rear passenger)	5/5 stars
Rollover (4x2)	4/5 stars
Rollover (4x4)	4/5 stars

=== IIHS ===
IIHS safety ratings for a model of 2012:

Test	Rating
Moderate overlap front	Good
Side	Good
Roof strength	Marginal
Head restraint & seats	Marginal

=== ANCAP ===
ANCAP test results Mazda CX-7 (2007)
Test	Score
Overall	5 /5 stars
Frontal offset	12.66/16
Side impact	16/16
Pole	2/2
Seat belt reminders	2/3
Whiplash protection	Not Assessed
Pedestrian protection	Poor
Electronic stability control	Standard

== Accolades ==
- 2007 International Car of the Year Awards: Crossover.
- 2008 RJC Car of the Year Special Award: Best SUV.
- 2009–2011 Autocar Indonesia Reader's Choice Award, Favorite Medium SUV 4x4.

== Replacement ==
Although praised for its driving dynamics and interior quality, the Mazda CX-7 was not space-efficient for its mid-size crossover dimensions, having only comparable passenger and cargo room to compact crossover SUVs like the Honda CR-V. Furthermore in North America, the CX-7 was only offered with a fuel-thirsty turbo engine (although a non-turbo engine was later made available). The CX-7 was discontinued in August 2012 in favor of the new Mazda CX-5. The CX-5 is classified as a compact crossover SUV, but nonetheless has similar interior dimensions, despite having a smaller footprint than the mid-size CX-7.

It was initially expected that the CX-7 nameplate would be reused on an all-new seven-seater based on a stretched Mazda CX-5, due to the growing popularity of three-row crossovers. However, Mazda instead introduced the Mazda CX-8 three-row crossover, which is essentially a long-wheelbase version of the second-generation CX-5. The CX-8 was announced in mid-2017 and released in Japan on September 14, 2017.
