= Aston Martin Lagonda Vignale =

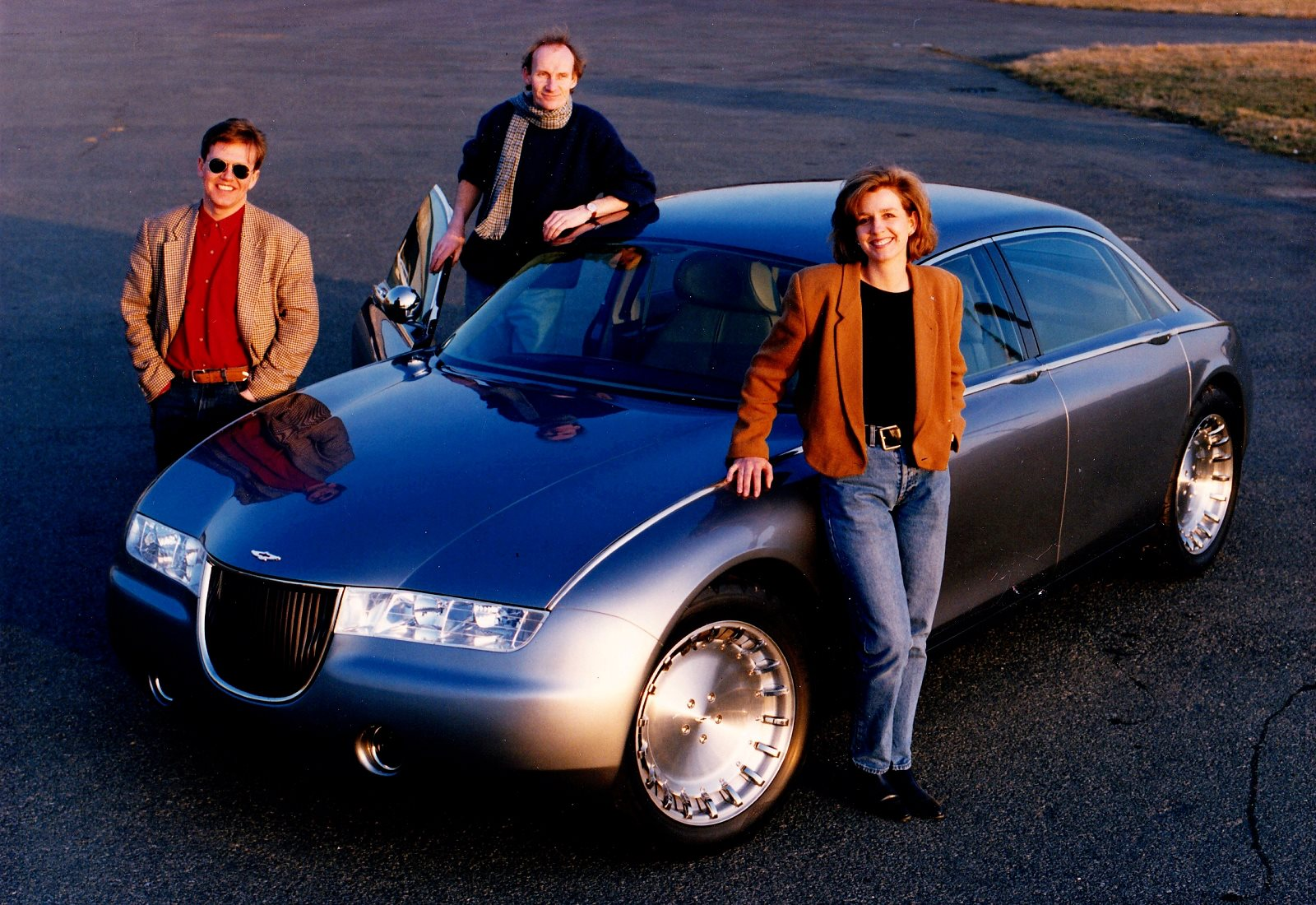
- The 3 designers of the 1993 Lagonda Vignale with the car (l-r): Moray Callum, David Wilkie, and Sally Erickson Wilson

Overview
- Manufacturer: Lagonda (Aston Martin)
- Also called: Lagonda Vignale
- Production: 1993; 2 built
- Designer: Moray Callum at Ghia

Body and chassis
- Class: Concept car
- Body style: 4-door sedan
- Layout: FR layout
- Platform: Ford Panther platform
- Related: Lincoln Town Car

Powertrain
- Engine: 4.6 L SOHC Ford Modular V8
- Transmission: 4-speed automatic

Dimensions
- Wheelbase: 3,117.8 mm (122.75 in)
- Length: 5,232.4 mm (206 in)
- Width: 1,981.2 mm (78 in)
- Height: 1,447.8 mm (57 in)

The Aston Martin Lagonda Vignale is a five-seater concept car built by Ghia for Lagonda. It was designed by Moray Callum at Ghia — with interior design by David Wilkie and colour/materials by Sally Ericson — and presented in 1993 at the Geneva Motor Show alongside the Aston Martin DB7, designed by Moray's older brother, Ian Callum. Built to gauge interest for a 4-door Aston Martin model, the concept was well received, but never went into production as Ford decided that the Lagonda brand would be too expensive to revive due to its relative obscurity outside of the U.K.

== Specifications ==
The Lagonda Vignale is based on an extended 1990 Lincoln Town Car chassis and uses that car's 4.6 L Ford Modular V8 engine producing 190 hp (142 kW; 193 PS) and 270 lb⋅ft (366 N⋅m) of torque, mated to a 4-speed automatic transmission. It also shares the Town Car's independent front, and solid rear suspension. It was planned that a production version of the Lagonda Vignale would utilise a 5,935 cc (5.9 L; 362.2 cu in), 48 valve V12 engine. The body of the Lagonda Vignale is made from composite materials and features nickel trim in place of chrome to take advantage of the subtle tones found in nickel. The interior was designed by David Wilkie and its materials were chosen by Sally Wilson. It features analine-dyed parchment leather, beech wood and aluminum trim, woolen carpets and headliner, nickel brightwork and rear power operated desks which feature a laptop on one side and a vanity on the other.

== Production ==
Three Lagonda Vignales were built in total. The original two, built by Ghia, had seating for five and used the Town Car's 4.6 L V8 engine. One was finished in grey while the other was finished in Sorrento Blue. The grey car was destroyed, while the blue car was sold in 2002 by Ford for US$403,500 at auction, surpassing its estimate of US$60,000–120,000. The third car, built by the Works Service department and codenamed DP2138, featured a myriad of changes from the original design with the intention of putting the car into production. It used a different Ford platform, giving it smaller dimensions, changes to the design, including different headlights and a redesigned grille, burgundy paintwork, and, most notably, a Jaguar V12 engine. Additionally, it could only seat four as the rear bench seat had been replaced by twin seats. Only one example was built and it was sold to the Sultan of Brunei for £1.3m in 1995.
