= Moray Callum =

Scottish automobile designer

- Born: 19 November 1958 (age 68); Dumfries, Scotland, UK
- Occupations: Vice President, Design (Retired)
- Employer: Ford Motor Company
- Known for: Design of the Mazda MX-5 (NC), CX-7, and CX-9 (TB)

Moray S. Callum (born 19 November 1958) is a Scottish automobile designer who was vice president, design, for Ford Motor Company, having retired on 1 May 2021. His elder brother Ian Callum was the Design Director of Jaguar from 1999 to 2019.

== Early years ==
Callum was born in Dumfries, Scotland. He initially intended to become a veterinarian, though by university age Callum elected to study architecture at Napier University in Edinburgh before becoming disillusioned with the prospect of calculating the size of waste pipes of seven-story buildings for the rest of his life. He changed disciplines and graduated in industrial design and followed the well-trodden car designer path of continuing his studies at the Royal College of Art in London, graduating with a master's degree in transportation design.

== Career ==
=== Early career ===
Upon graduation, Callum's car design career began in 1982 where he worked for Chrysler before joining PSA Peugeot Citroën advanced studio in Poissy, France, contributing to the design of passenger and commercial vehicles. In 1988/1989, Callum joined Ghia as a consultant designer where he contributed to the 1989 Ghia Via concept and the Aston Martin Lagonda Vignale. He also participated in Ghia's design consultancy to Jaguar.

=== Ford ===
In 1995 Callum was hired by Ford, for whom he had worked on numerous projects at Ghia, to work in Dearborn, Michigan, on North American vehicles. He worked on various notable North American projects including the facelift of the 2000 Ford Taurus, whose front grille design has been mischievously cited by some critics as the inspiration for his brother's 2006 Jaguar XK design, as opposed to the Jaguar E-Type which inspired both. He also did work on the Ford Windstar, Mercury Villager, Super Duty pickup trucks, Ford Excursion, and the Ford EX concept.

=== Mazda ===
On 7 September 2001, Callum was promoted to lead Mazda worldwide design, where his team included Tsutomu "Tom" Matano, the designer of the Mazda MX-5. Callum was tasked with revitalising the Mazda range, which by the late 1990s was regarded as bland, and in this respect Callum has largely been viewed as successful with the creation of a consistent brand look that featured 'crisp black interiors and red-lighted instruments' and exteriors with 'edgy shapes that were emotional and almost biological – part flame, part flower, expressive of the sporting image the company sought'. He oversaw the daunting 2005 redesign of the iconic MX-5 and worked on almost every other vehicle in Mazda's passenger car range including the 2006 Mazda5. He was also responsible for leading the design of Mazda's new sporty crossovers, the 2007 CX-7 and CX-9 which were previewed by the 2005 Mazda MX-Crossport concept. He was also instrumental in the production of the Washu (Detroit 2003), Ibuki (Tokyo 2003), and Kabura (Detroit 2006) concept cars.

=== Return to Ford ===
Having overseen Mazda's successful reinvention as a dynamic and sporty brand, Callum was moved by J Mays back to Ford as Design Director for Ford's North American brands passenger cars where he reported to Peter Horbury from May 2006. This move, along with Horbury's appointment as Executive Design Director for Ford North American brands, was part of Ford's attempt to consolidate its ‘Red, White & Bold’ design strategy in an attempt to breathe fresh design into its expanding car line-up in North America. Callum was replaced at Mazda by Laurens van den Acker whilst his predecessor Patrick Schiavone was appointed designer of North American SUVs and pick-ups at Ford.

In May 2009, Horbury returned to Volvo Cars and Callum was promoted to executive director, Ford Americas design, with overall responsibility for American trucks and passenger cars, including Lincoln. During this time, he oversaw the design and launch of numerous American products, for example: the 2011 fifth generation Ford Explorer, 2013 second generation Ford Fusion, 2013 second generation Lincoln MKZ, and 2013 second generation Ford EcoSport.

In 2014, Callum was promoted to vice president, design, Ford Motor Company, replacing the retiring J Mays and charged with responsibility of all concept and production vehicles for the Ford and Lincoln brands globally. He unveiled the 2015 sixth generation Ford Mustang and the 2017 second generation Ford GT.

On 1 May 2021, Moray retired from Ford Motor Company, superseded by Anthony Lo, formerly of Renault.
