= Mazda Ibuki =

Overview
- Manufacturer: Mazda
- Production: 2003 (Concept)
- Designer: Moray Callum; Truman Pollard; Isao Tōda

Body and chassis
- Class: Concept car
- Body style: 2-door roadster
- Layout: Front mid-engine, rear-wheel-drive
- Platform: Mazda SE platform
- Related: Mazda RX-8; Mazda MX-5 (NC)

Powertrain
- Engine: 1.6 L (98 cu in) MZR ZM-DE DOHC I4 (gasoline electric)
- Electric motor: Electric Hybrid motor assist
- Transmission: 6-speed manual
- Hybrid drivetrain: FHEV

Dimensions
- Wheelbase: 2,330 mm (91.7 in)
- Length: 3,640 mm (143.3 in)
- Width: 1,720 mm (67.7 in)
- Height: 1,230 mm (48.4 in)

The Mazda Ibuki (マツダ・息吹, Matsuda Ibuki) was a concept car by Mazda revealed at the 2003 Tokyo Motor Show and the 2004 Chicago Auto Show. Although not its inspiration, the Ibuki previewed the third generation MX-5 ahead of its 2005 launch.

The Ibuki, which is Japanese for "breathing new energy" or "adding vigor", was built on a variation of the Mazda RX-8's platform. Its body consisted of a reinforced open frame with a rigid backbone frame under the transmission tunnel and plastic body panels. To further emphasize its light weight, its brake discs and inner door panels were made of aluminum, the propeller shaft and engine frame used carbon fiber, and its wheels were cast in magnesium alloy. Power came from a 1.6 L (98 cu in) MZR ZM-DE I4 engine paired with an electric motor and mated to a 6-speed manual transmission, generating 180 bhp (130 kW) and 133 lbf⋅ft (180 N⋅m) torque. To ensure an even weight distribution, the air conditioning unit was mounted behind the seats. Safety features included a four-point active rollbar in the front pillars and rear cowl section that instantly lifted up under impact sensor control in case of a rollover.
