= Mazda MX-5 (NC) =

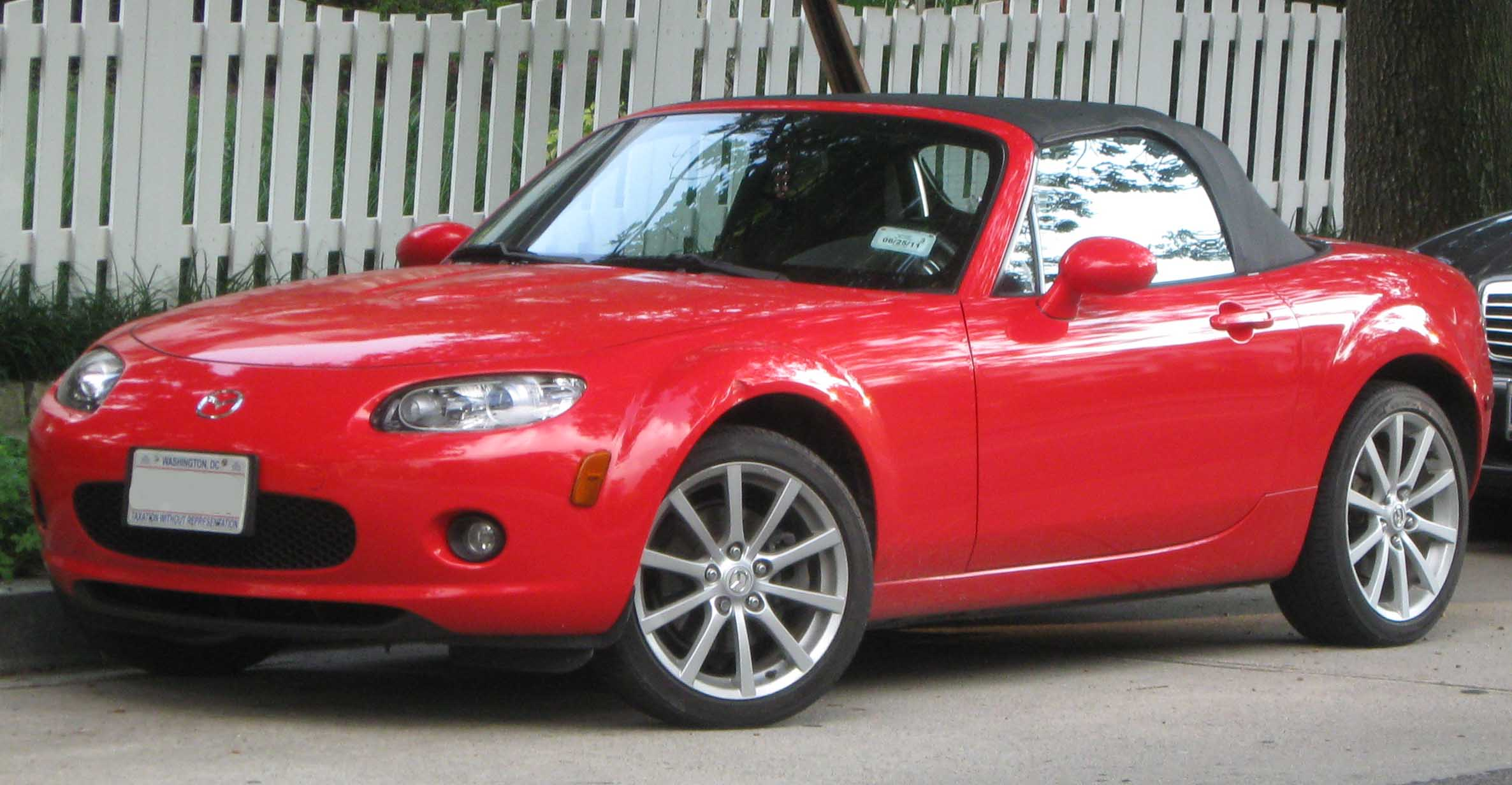

Overview
- Manufacturer: Mazda
- Model code: NC
- Also called: Mazda Roadster (Japan); Mazda MX-5 Miata (U.S.)
- Production: 2005–2015
- Model years: 2006–2015 (North America)
- Assembly: Japan: Hiroshima (Ujina Plant No. 1)
- Designer: Yasushi Nakamuta (2003); Moray Callum

Body and chassis
- Class: Roadster, sports car (S)
- Body style: 2-door convertible; 2-door folding hardtop roadster
- Layout: Front mid-engine, rear-wheel-drive
- Related: Mazda Ibuki; Mazda RX-8; Mitsuoka Himiko

Powertrain
- Engine: 1.8 L (110 cu in) MZR L8-DE DOHC I4 (Europe); 2.0 L (120 cu in) MZR LF-VE DOHC I4
- Power output: 126 hp (94 kW) (1.8 L); 167 hp (125 kW) (2.0 L)
- Transmission: 5-speed manual; 6-speed Aisin AZ6 manual; 6-speed SJ6A-EL Activematic automatic

Dimensions
- Wheelbase: 2,330 mm (91.7 in)
- Length: 4,000 mm (157.5 in) (soft-top); 4,020 mm (158.3 in) (PRHT)
- Width: 1,720 mm (67.7 in)
- Height: 1,240 mm (48.8 in) (soft-top); 1,255 mm (49.4 in) (PRHT)
- Curb weight: 1,110 kg (2,450 lb) (soft-top); 1,153 kg (2,542 lb) (PRHT)

Chronology
- Predecessor: Mazda MX-5 (NB)
- Successor: Mazda MX-5 (ND)

The Mazda MX-5 (NC) is the third generation of the Mazda MX-5 manufactured from 2005 to 2015. At its introduction in 2005, it won the Car of the Year Japan Award and made Car and Driver's 10Best list from 2006 to 2013.

The NC is the first MX-5 generation to offer a retractable hardtop variant, with its roof able to fold or deploy in 12 seconds without reducing trunk space.

== 2005—2008 (NC1) ==
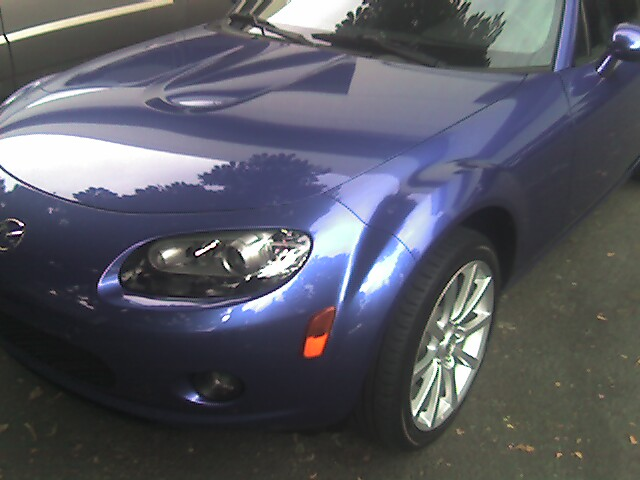
The third-generation MX-5 has fender bulges over the wheel wells.

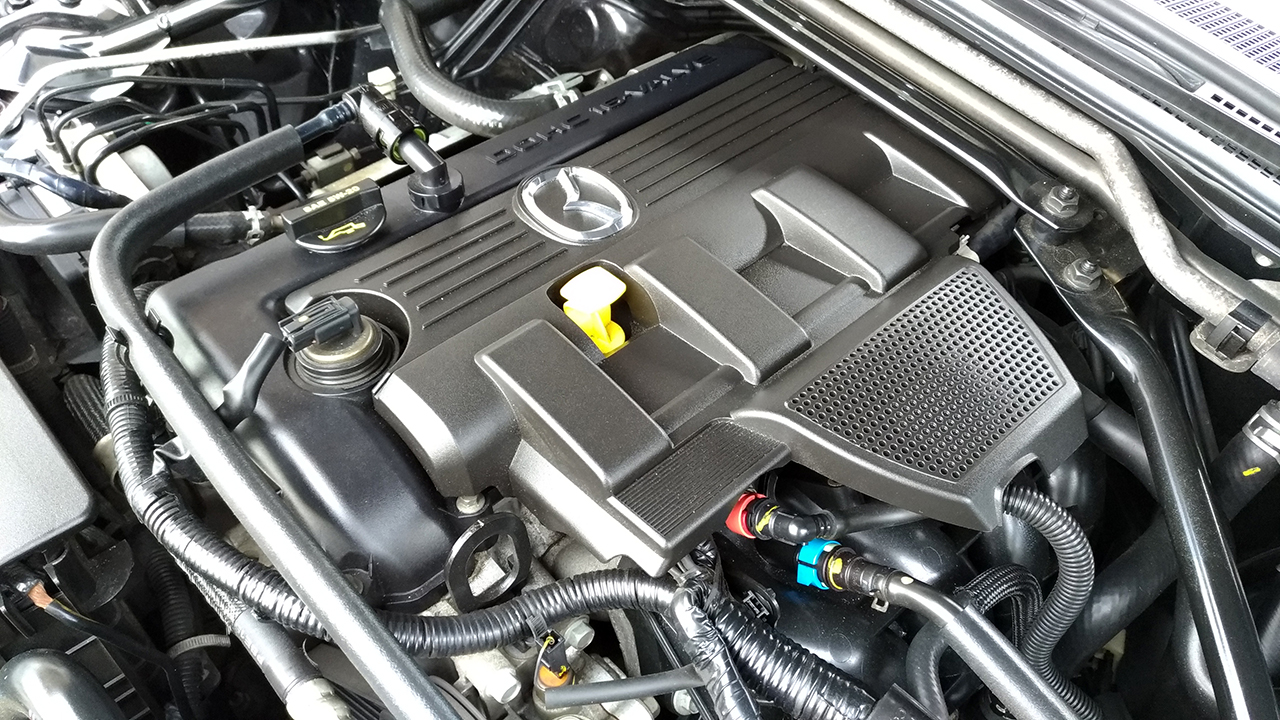
Mazda MX-5 NC 2.0 L MZR LF-VE engine

Yasushi Nakamuta designed the exterior of the NC, reusing no components of the NB, except for the fender-mounted turn signal lights on non-U.S. models, and rear differential internals. The chief designer of this model generation was Moray Callum. The 2003 Mazda Ibuki concept served as a preview of the new model. The suspension changed from a four-wheel double wishbone setup to a front wishbone/rear multilink setup, shared with the Mazda RX-8. NC models had traction control and stability control. According to Car and Driver, the NC has a skidpad number of 0.90g.

For the U.S., the engine was the 16-valve, 2.0 L (120 cu in) MZR LF-VE DOHC I4, producing 124 kW (166 hp) and 190 N⋅m (140 lbf⋅ft) of torque coupled to either a 5-speed or a 6-speed manual transmission, or 118 kW (158 hp) with the optional 6-speed automatic transmission. A limited-slip differential was available with the 6-speed manual option. In Australia, the 2.0 L (120 cu in) MZR was offered, rated at 118 kW (158 bhp) and 188 N⋅m (139 lbf⋅ft) of torque and the 6-speed manual transmission and LSD are standard. In Europe, two engines were offered: the 2.0 L (120 cu in) MZR LF-VE rated at 118 kW (158 bhp) and 188 N⋅m (139 lbf⋅ft) of torque, coupled to the 6-speed manual transmission; and a new 1.8 L (110 cu in) MZR L8-VE, rated at 94 kW (126 bhp) and 167 N⋅m (123 lbf⋅ft), coupled to the 5-speed manual transmission.

A 6-speed automatic transmission, with steering wheel-mounted paddle shifters, was optional. A test by Car and Driver magazine revealed a 0-97 km/h (60 mph) time of 6.5 s for the 2.0 L (120 cu in) U.S.-spec NC. Manufacturer figures for the European-spec model are: 0-100 km/h (62 mph) in 9.4 s for the 1.8 and 7.9 s for the 2.0. As of this generation, the car no longer complies with Japanese law's maximum exterior width dimension for the mid-size vehicle tax class, making Japanese buyers liable for additional costs for ownership.

=== Power Retractable Hard Top ===
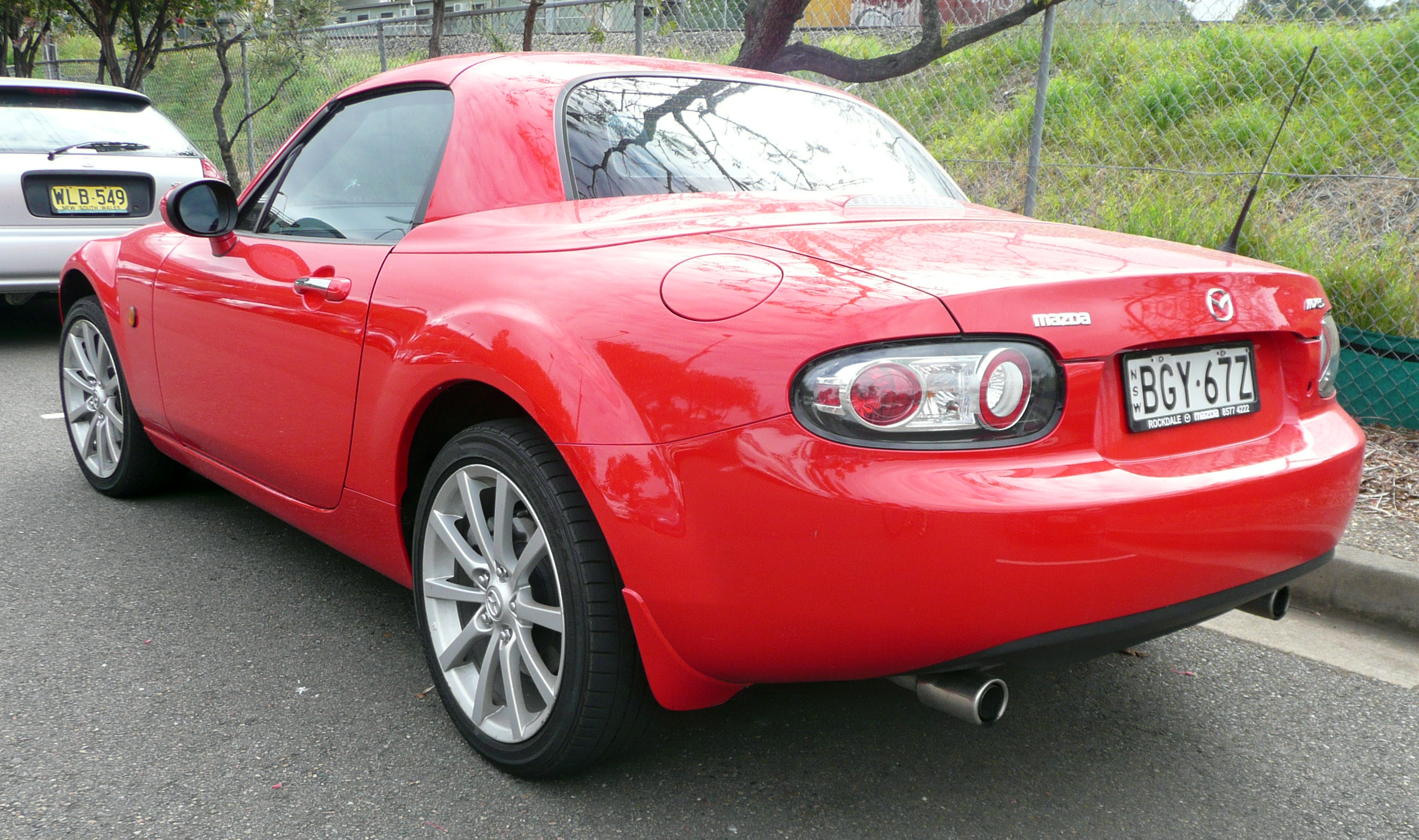
Mazda MX-5 Power Retractable Hard Top (Australia; pre-facelift)

In July 2006, Mazda debuted a Power Retractable Hard Top (PRHT) version of the NC with a two-piece folding hardtop, named MX-5 Roadster Coupé in Europe, Roadster Power Retractable Hard Top in Japan, and MX-5 Miata Power Retractable Hard Top in the U.S. and Canada. Designed by Webasto and constructed of polycarbonate, the top requires 12 seconds to raise or lower, and the first models were delivered to customers in late August 2006. The hardtop adds 36 kg (79 lb) to the weight of a comparably equipped soft-top, without diminishing trunk space when retracted. The PRHT omits one of the soft-top's two storage compartments behind the seats to accommodate the folding roof mechanism and has a steel trunk lid instead of the soft-top's aluminum. Performance times are slightly affected with the weight increase, with the 0-100 km/h (62 mph) time increased to 9.6 s for the 1.8 and 8.2 seconds for the 2.0. Thanks to better aerodynamics, though, top speed is increased from 196 km/h (121.8 mph) to 200 km/h (124.3 mph) for the smaller-engined model and from 210 km/h (130 mph) to 215 km/h (134 mph) for the 2.0. These figures are for the European-spec models. For all PRHT models, the suspension was slightly modified to handle the additional weight, with slightly stiffer springs.

=== Special editions (2005—2008) ===
Troy Lee Designs MX-5 (2005)

Introduced at the 2005 SEMA Show, the Troy Lee Designs MX-5 NC was a one-off model that had a custom silver/black paint scheme by L&G Enterprises, a body kit with rear deck cover designed by Keith Dean, 18-inch Volk Racing wheels, Wilwood brakes, and a custom black/red leather interior trim by Stitchcraft.

3rd Generation Limited (2006)

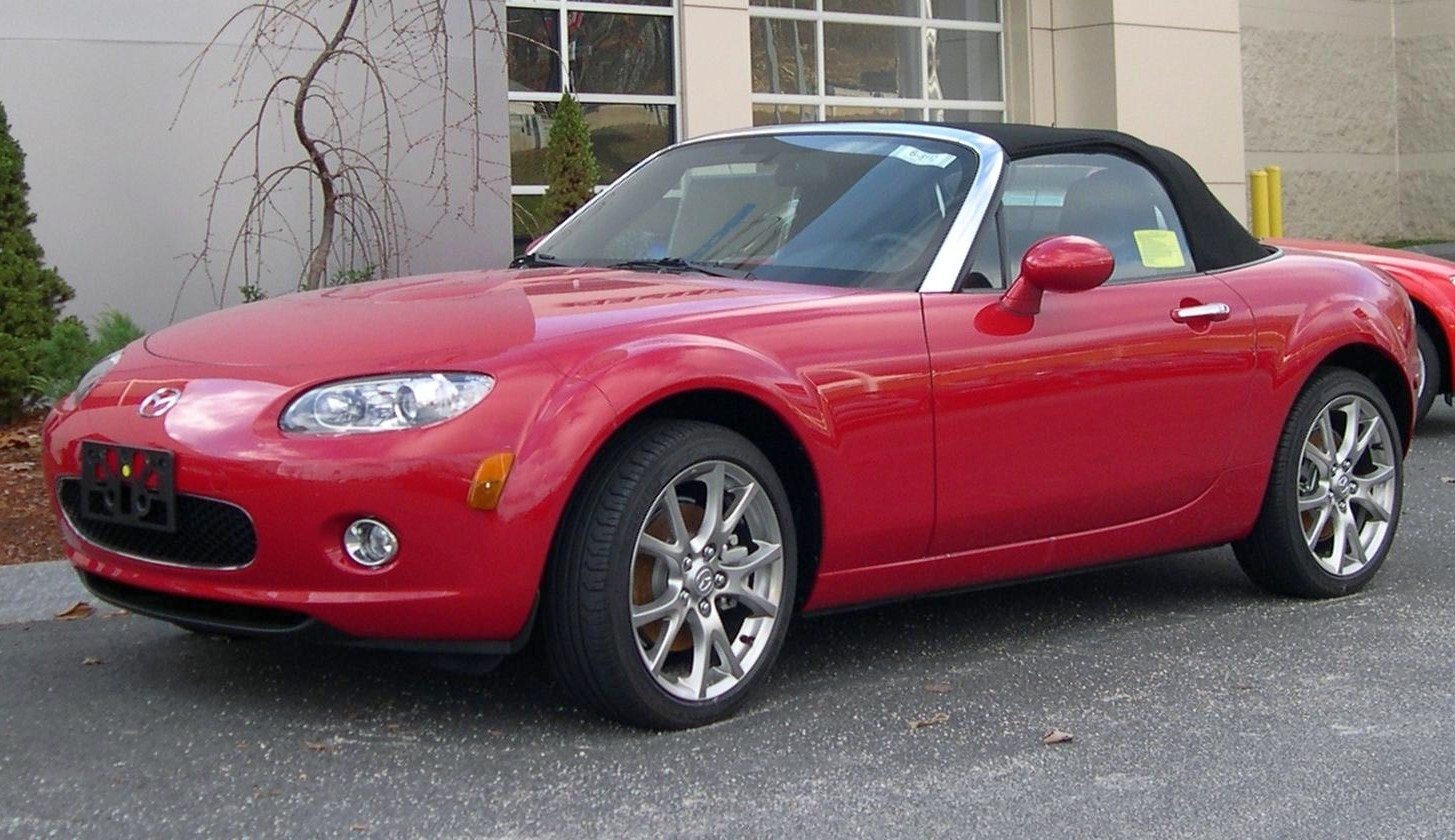
2006 Mazda MX-5 3rd Generation Limited

Making its debut at the 2005 New York International Auto Show, the 3rd Generation Limited was a launch edition of the MX-5 NC which had added chrome accents, stainless steel scuff plates, and special 17-inch wheels. Velocity Red was an exclusive color to this edition. A limited run of 3,500 were built worldwide (300 in the UK, 750 in the U.S., 150 in Canada), delivered in advance of standard models.

MS-R Package (2007)

The MS-R (Motor Sport-Racing) package was designed specifically to enhance the on-track performance of the MX-5 in Sports Car Club of America (SCCA) Showroom Stock B (SSB) road racing and C-Stock (CS) autocrossing. The MS-R package is based on the SV model MX-5, which already includes a 124 kW (166 hp) 2.0-liter four-cylinder MZR engine, five-speed manual transmission, four-wheel disc brakes. The package adds a limited-slip differential, front shock-tower brace, underbody chassis bracing, 17-inch alloy wheels, Koni shock absorbers, racing-specific front and rear sway bars, higher-rate springs to provide a lower ride height and a rear lip spoiler.

Roadster Kurenai Concept (2007)

Introduced at the 2007 Tokyo Auto Salon, the Kurenai Concept was a PRHT model in Radiant Ebony color with chrome accents, custom 17-inch alloy wheels, and a red leather and Alcantara interior.

2008 Special Edition

For 2008, Mazda released a Special Edition MX-5 with an Icy Blue exterior and exclusive Dark Saddle Brown folding top, and matching leather with blue stitching on the steering wheel, seats, and hand brake lever. The Special Edition also had a silver-accented shift knob, dark-silver finished instrument panel with chrome accents, special 17-inch (430 mm) alloy wheels, stainless steel MX-5 scuff plates, and chrome front headlight bezels, as well as grille and fog lamp surrounds. The 2008 Special Edition was limited to 105 PRHT-equipped units in Canada and 750 soft-top units in the U.S.

MX-5 Niseko (2008)

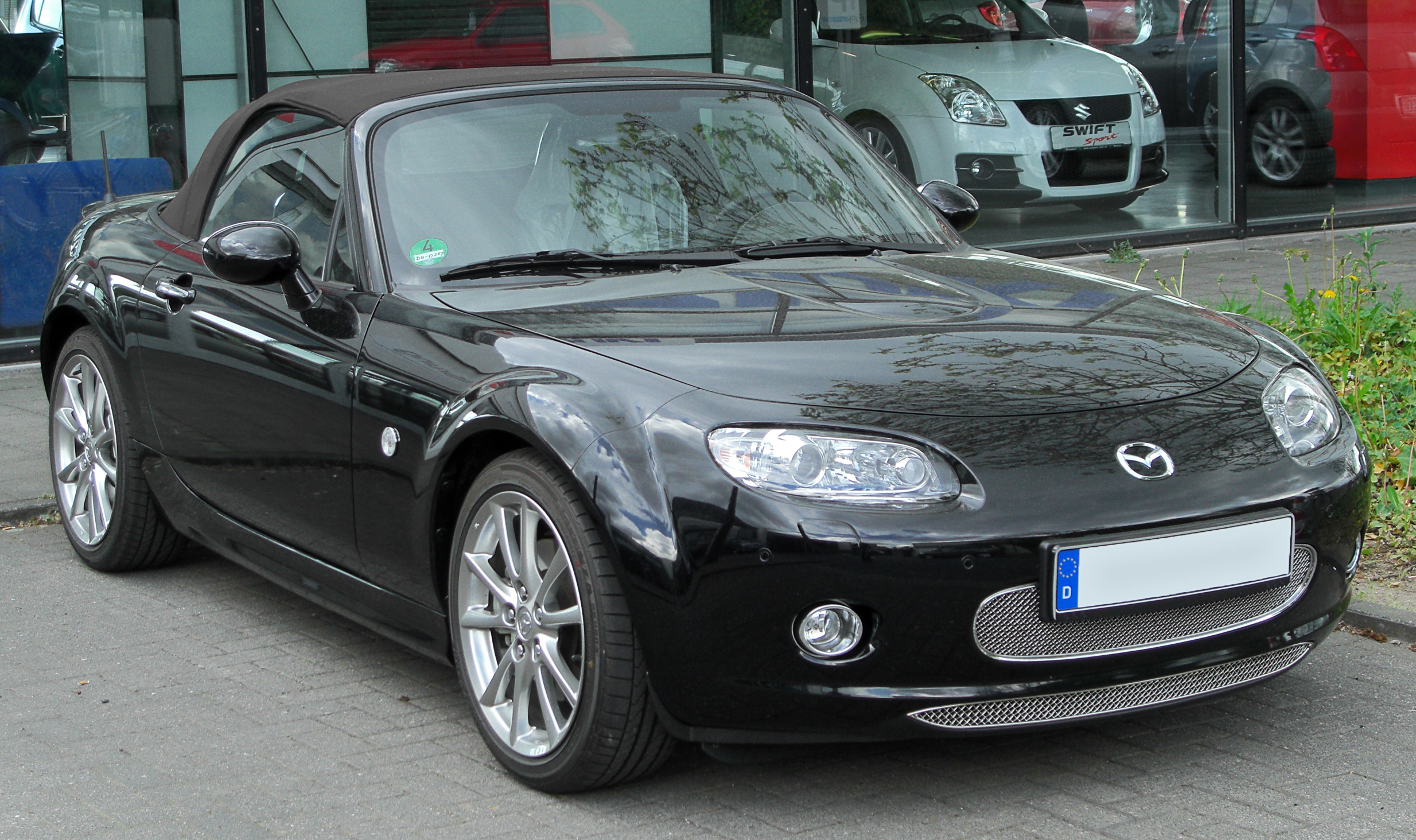
2008 Mazda MX-5 Niseko

Named after the Niseko Mt. Resort Grand Hirafu, the Europe-exclusive MX-5 Niseko was offered in either the 1.8-liter soft-top or 2.0-liter PRHT, with the 5-speed manual being the only available transmission. Color choices consisted of Icy Blue and Sunlight Silver; German units were available in five colors. The interior had Niseko badges on the front fenders, color-coded roll bar trim, Niseko branded floor mats, and similar add-ons used in the 2008 Special Edition model. The MX-5 Niseko was limited to 800 units in the UK; 240 for the soft-top and 560 for the PRHT.

== 2009 facelift (NC2) ==
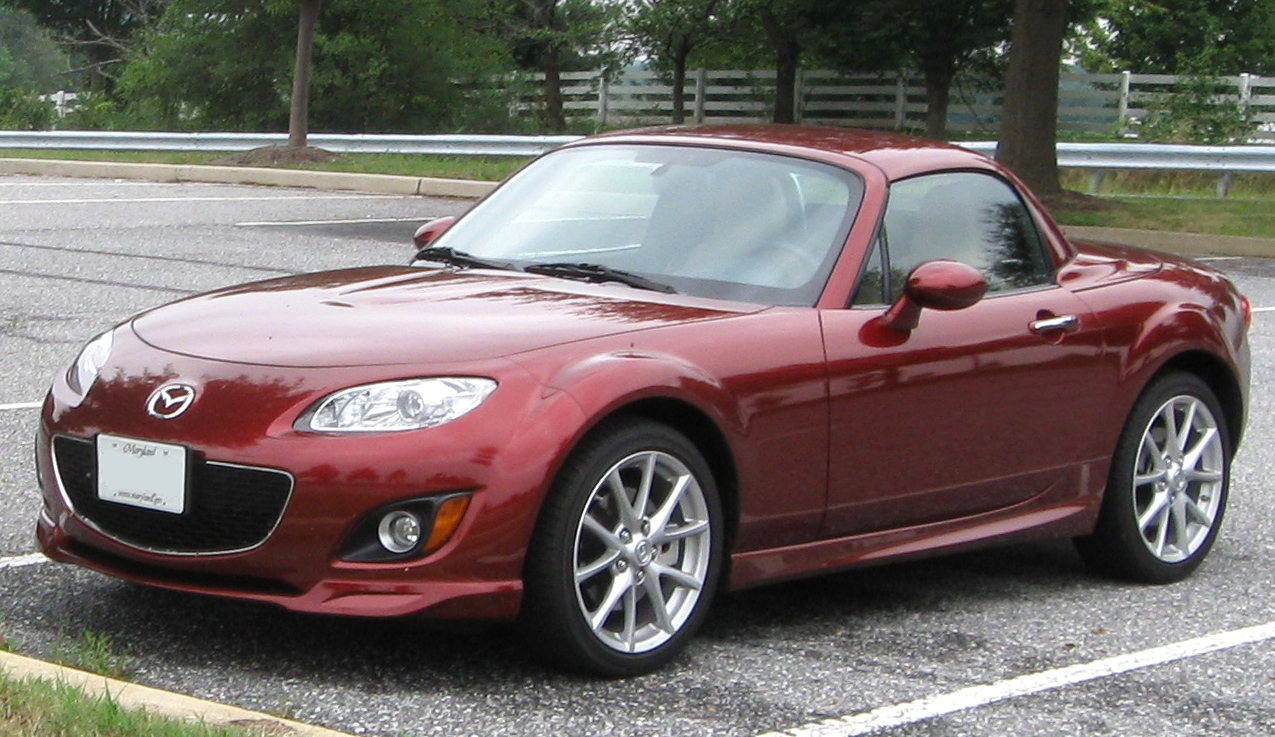
2009 MX-5 with 2009 facelifted front fascia

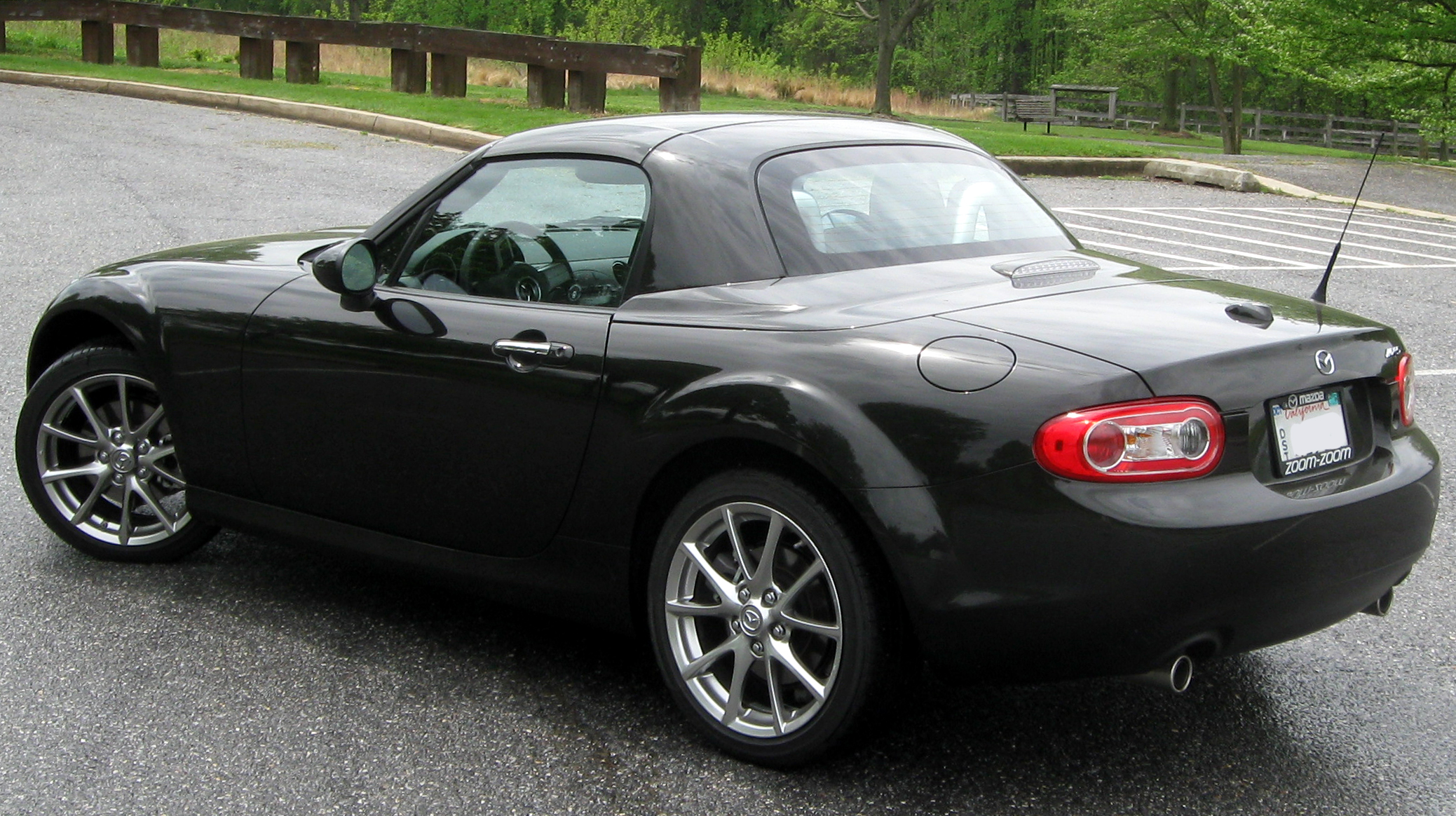
2011 MX-5 with 2009 facelifted rear fascia

The MX-5 facelift was presented at the 2008 Paris Motor Show and Science Museum in London, and later at the 2009 Chicago Auto Show.

The Japanese model went on sale on December 9, 2008, at Mazda and Mazda Anfini dealers.

Revisions included a restyled front incorporating elements from Mazda's newer models like the larger grille and new head and fog lights. Further restyled elements include the side skirts, rear bumper and the tail lights. The soft-top Touring and Grand Touring models had a mesh grille bordered by a chrome frame. The hardtop PRHT Roadster Coupe had a mesh grille bordered by a chrome frame and chrome elements inside the headlamps and outer door handles.

The instrument panel had darker features and redesigned graphics for the gauges. To create more leg space in the cabin, a protrusion from the door pockets was eliminated.

The 2.0 L; 122.0 cu in (1,999 cc) I4 engine was rated 125 kW (167 bhp) at 7,000 rpm and 190 N⋅m (140 lb⋅ft) at 5,000 rpm for the 5-speed manual transmission, 118 kW (158 bhp) at 6,700 rpm with the fuel cut-off at 7,200 rpm and 190 N⋅m (140 lb⋅ft) at 5,000 rpm for the automatic transmission. Engine redline was raised by 500 rpm to 7,200 rpm in manual model and fuel cut at 7,500 rpm. The suspension and gearbox have been fine-tuned; with the latter offering smoother shifts and an automatic transmission will be introduced in Europe for the first time.

=== Special editions (2009—2012) ===
MX-5 Superlight version (2009)

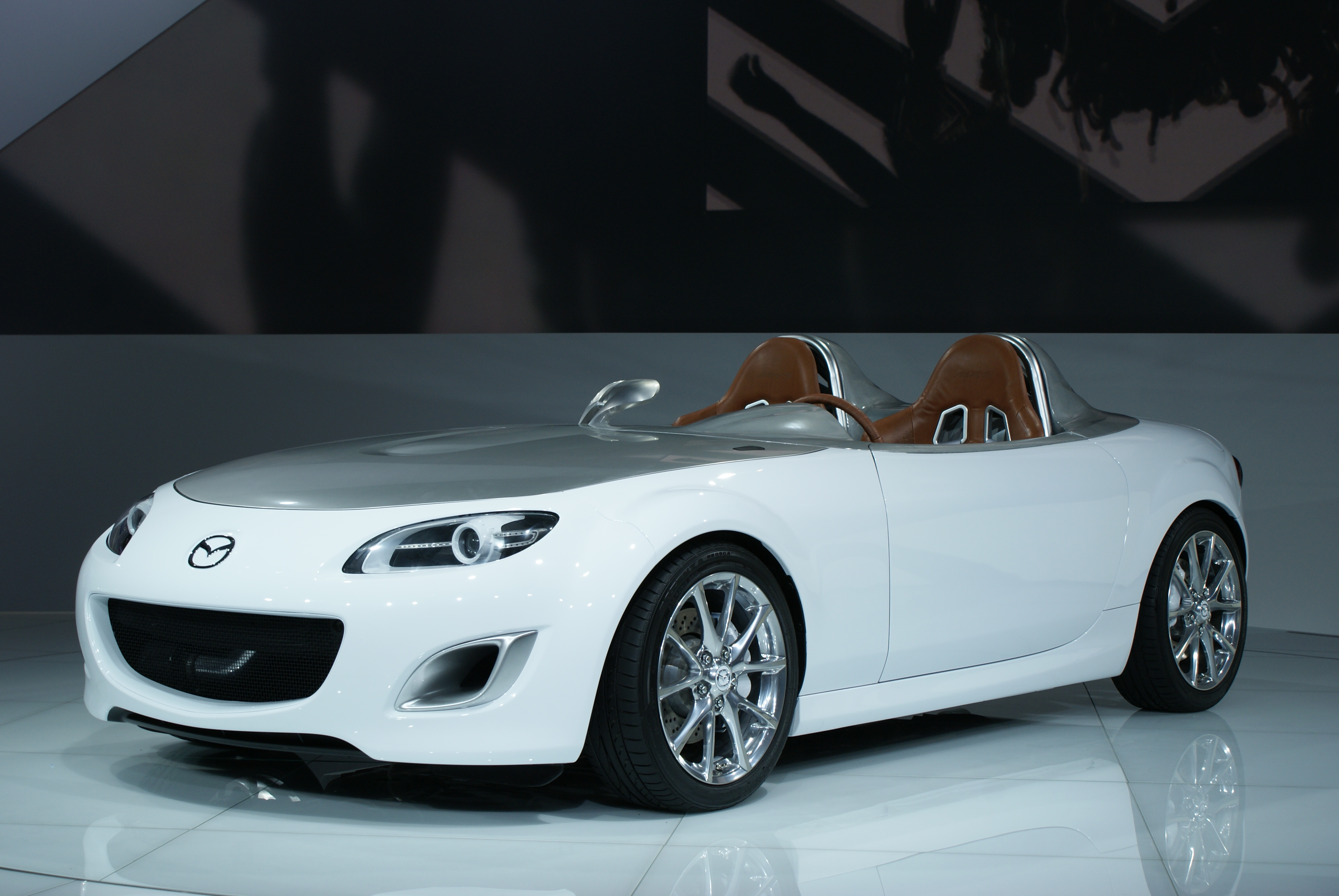
The MX-5 Superlight at 2009 IAA.

The MX-5 Superlight is a concept car commemorating the 20th anniversary of MX-5 production, designed at Mazda's studio in Frankfurt, Germany. It is made of lightweight materials to improve performance, handling, fuel economy and CO_{2} emissions and does not include a windshield. It was unveiled at the 2009 Frankfurt Motor Show.

The vehicle is powered by a MZR 1.8-liter petrol engine rated at 93 kW (125 hp) at 6,500 rpm and 167 N⋅m (123 lb⋅ft) torque at 4,500 rpm. It has a 5-speed manual transmission, double wishbone front and multi-link rear suspension, Bilstein monotube dampers, 205/45R17 tires, 300 mm (11.8 in) ventilated front brake discs and 280 mm (11.0 in) solid rear brake discs. The "Superlight" weighs in at 1,000 kg (2,200 lb), making it 59 kg (130 lb) heavier than the original NA 1.8 series MX-5.

Mazda Roadster 20th Anniversary (2009)

The Roadster 20th Anniversary models are based on the Roadster RS soft-top model with a six-speed manual transmission, and the VS Power Retractable Hard Top (PRHT) model with a six-speed automatic transmission, for the Japanese market, commemorating 20 years of Mazda Roadster. Special equipment included Recaro bucket sport seats (black Alcantara and red leather), exclusive '20th Anniversary' badges on each side fender, clear front fog lights and bezels (black and silver on soft-top and PRHT models respectively), 205/45R17 84W tires with 17-inch aluminum wheels (standard equipment on the soft-top base model), cowl connecting type front strut tower bar (standard equipment on the soft-top base model), fabric soft-top with glass rear window (soft-top model only), heated seats with five temperature settings (standard equipment on the PRHT base model) and soft padding with synthetic leather on the door armrests and center console lid (standard equipment on the PRHT base model).

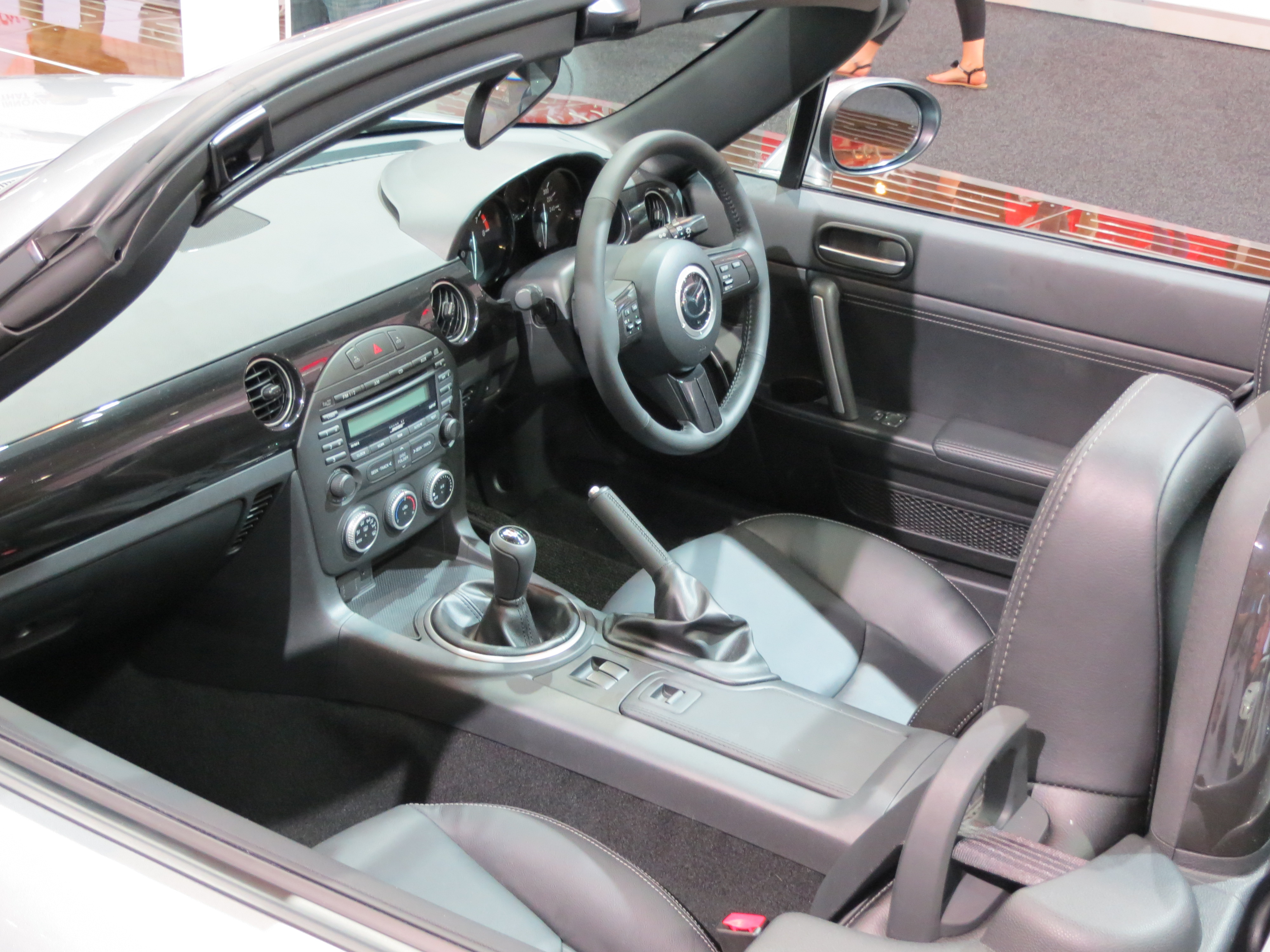
Interior (facelift)

MX-5 20th Anniversary Edition (2010)

The 20th Anniversary Model is a limited version of the MX-5 soft-top with a MZR 1.8L engine with only 2,000 produced. It was built for the European market to commemorate 20 years of MX-5 production. It includes a special exterior styling package with a chrome grille, door handles and headlight fascia, silver-look fog lamp frames, unique 17-inch alloy wheels and 20th Anniversary logos and a strut tower bar. Available body colors include True Red, Crystal White Pearl and, specific for this edition, a new Aurora Blue (with matching painted decorative elements in the interior).

The vehicle was unveiled at the 2010 Geneva Motor Show.

The UK model covered 32% of the Anniversary model production (around 600 units), which was based on the soft-top 1.8 SE. It included 10-spoke 17-inch alloy wheels with a unique silver finish, front fog lights, chrome trims around the grille, headlamps and fog lights, body-colored roll bars and a supporting strut brace. Inside, the stainless steel scuff plate has a unique '20th Anniversary' logo and limited edition number, premium '20th Anniversary' branded floor mats, a body-colored front dashboard, aluminum pedal set, and manual air conditioning, leather-wrapped steering wheel, gear knob and hand-brake lever; MP3-compatible Radio/CD audio system with six speakers, steering wheel controls and an auxiliary input jack for MP3 and iPod connection. Available body colors include red, white and blue. True Red, Crystal White Pearlescent, Aurora Blue Mica body colors were £395 options.

MX-5 Miyako (2010)

The MX-5 Miyako is a limited edition of the MX-5 Soft-Top Convertible available in two versions, the MX-5 1.8i Miyako and the 2.0i Miyako. 500 units of each were produced. The 1.8i Miyako has a MZR 1.8-liter engine and a powered retractable hardtop, while the 2.0i Miyako is powered by the MZR 2.0-liter engine. It was built for the UK market to commemorate 20 years of MX-5 production. The Miyako package included Medici premium perforated black leather trim with a red underlay and stitching, special badging, floor mats and climate control air conditioning. The exterior includes front fog lamps, larger 17-inch alloy wheels, a front suspension strut brace, and metallic paint Aluminum Silver Metallic on the 2.0i Miyako and Velocity Red Mica on 1.8i Miyako). Both Miyako models also included remote central locking, a leather-wrapped steering wheel with audio controls, an MP3 compatible audio system with six speakers and auxiliary jack input, heated electric mirrors and electric front windows and a Thatcham Category 1 alarm with immobiliser. The 2.0i Miyako also included a limited-slip differential, Dynamic Stability Control and Traction Control.

MX-5 Matte and Black Special Edition (2010)

The MX-5 Matte and Black Special Edition is a limited-edition version of the MX-5 with a MZR 2.0-liter engine, built to commemorate 20 years of MX-5 production in France. The vehicle was unveiled at the 21st annual Salon du Cabriolet, Coupé & SUV in Paris.

2010 SEMA concept

Unveiled at the 2010 SEMA Show, the MX-5 Super20 included a DPTune-reflashed ECU with a supercharged Cosworth motor, ACT clutch, MAZDASPEED coilover shocks and shock tower brace, and Racing Beat hollow anti-roll bars. It also had StopTech brakes, SpeedSource brake disks and 16-inch Enkei wheels.

2011 Special Edition

Limited to 750 units in the U.S., the 2011 Special Edition was offered only as a PRHT version. The vehicles was available in Dolphin Gray Mica or Sparkling Black Mica with gray leather interior, Bilstein shocks, and LSD.

MX-5 Sport Black (2011)

The MX-5 Sport Black is a limited edition of the MX-5 powered retractable hardtop (PRHT) with a 120 kW (160 PS) MZR-2.0L engine and Sport Tech equipment package, inspired by the Mazda MX-5 GT race car and built for the UK market. 500 examples were produced. It included a Brilliant Black powered retractable hardtop, black leather interior with contrasting 'sand' color stitching, Piano Black steering wheel and deco panel, and unique 'Black Limited Edition' exterior badging, uniquely numbered interior plaque and Limited Edition floor mats as well as dark 'gun metal' 17-inch alloy wheels and a limited-slip differential. Available body colors included Spirited Green metallic, Crystal White Pearlescent and Velocity Red mica.

The vehicle went on sale in mid-July 2011.

Mazda Roadster BLACK TUNED (2011)

The Mazda Roadster BLACK TUNED models are based on the Mazda Roadster RS Power Retractable Hard Top with the 2.0-liter DOHC engine and six-speed manual transmission, and the Mazda Roadster VS Power Retractable Hard Top with 2.0-liter DOHC engine and six-speed electronically controlled automatic transmission. They were built for the Japanese market and included the following upgrades:

- Power Retractable Hard Top (Brilliant Black)
- 17-inch alloy wheels (Gun Metallic)
- Front grille garnish (Brilliant Black)
- Door mirrors (Brilliant Black)
- Seat back bar garnish (Brilliant Black)
- Black leather seats (with sand-colored stitching)
- Black door trim (with sand-colored stitching)
- Decoration panel (piano black)
- Leather-wrapped steering wheel (with sand-colored stitching and piano black switch bezels)
- Leather-wrapped parking brake lever (with sand-colored stitching)
- Front fog lights (clear) and fog light bezels (black)
- Outer door handles (body-colored)
- Bose AUDIOPILOT2 sound system and seven speakers (no head unit)
- Leather-wrapped shift knob (with chrome ring) RS RHT model only
- Soft pads on the side door trim arm rests (synthetic leather) (standard equipment on the base VS RHT model)
- Soft pad on the center console lid (synthetic leather) (standard equipment on the base VS RHT model)
- Seat heaters (with five temperature settings) (standard equipment on the base VS RHT model)
- Front suspension tower bar (built into the cowl) (standard equipment on the base RS RHT model)

Factory-installed options included 6-disc CD changer with AM/FM radio/MP3/WMA player and AUX jack. Available exterior body colors included Spirited Green Metallic (exclusive), Velocity Red Mica (exclusive) and Crystal Pearl White Mica (special body color).

The vehicles went on sale in October 2011 and were available at both Mazda and Mazda Anfini dealers.

2011 SEMA concepts (2011)

The MX-5 Spyder is an MX-5 soft-top designed by Mazda North American Operations and Magna Car Top Systems. It included a single-panel grenadine-red soft-top made by Haartz Corporation, lower car body, Stratosphere White body color, Yokohama AO48 225/45R17 performance with 17-inch 10-spoke ADVAN RS wheels in Gun Metal Metallic, a turbocharged MZR 2.0-liter engine fueled by BP's isobutanol, a lithium-ion racing battery made by Braille Battery, a Racing Beat header, intake and exhaust muffler, MAZDASPEED coil over kit, Brembo brakes, tanned Saddle black-leather seats with Aqua leather accents and Coal Ash suede inserts, Spider Silk Gray Metallic-colored trim pieces on the doors and dash, black interior, customized floor mats by Star West and a MAZDASPEED short-throw shifter.

The MX-5 Super20 included Hyper Orange Mica-colored body, stationary glossy black hardtop with matching orange stripes, color-matched roll bar, black leather seats with suede seat inserts and orange contrast channel stitching, DPTune reflashed ECU, Racing Beat 304-stainless steel header and exhaust, Racing Beat hollow front and rear anti-roll bars, ACT organic street clutch, MAZDASPEED coil overs and a shock tower brace, Power Slot slotted brake rotors, StopTech stainless steel brake lines and street performance brake pads, SpeedSource front brake ducts, black 16-inch Enkei RPF1 twin-spoke racing wheels, Toyo Proxes RA-1 245/45ZR16 high-performance tires, 20 mm (0.79 in) H&R Track+ bolt-on wheel spacers in the rear and 15 mm (0.59 in) Sparco wheel spacers in the front.

The vehicles were unveiled at the 2011 SEMA Show.

MX-5 Miata Special Version (2011)

Made in 2011, for the 2012 model year, the MX-5 Miata Special Version (SV trim) is a limited (180 units) version of the Canadian Market 2012 model year MX-5 Miata GX base trim (no suspension package) with 2.0L MZR gasoline engine with the following upgrades: Velocity Red Mica exterior with Brilliant Black PRHT, Brilliant Black exterior door mirrors and roll bar garnish, 17-inch gunmetal alloy wheels with 205/45R17 tires, heated black leather trimmed seats with sand-colored stitching, leather-wrapped steering wheel with Piano Black trim and sand-colored stitching, leather-wrapped parking brake with sand-colored stitching, leather-like door trim with sand colored stitching, Piano Black decoration panel, alloy pedals, auto A/C, external thermometer and trip computer, 6-speed manual transmission. The only optional equipment was a 6-speed electronically controlled automatic transmission with overdrive.

Tokyo Auto Salon 2012 concepts (2012)

The Mazda Roadster BLACK TUNED-2012 is based on Mazda Roadster BLACK TUNED, but with BBS lightweight alloy wheels, Bilstein height-adjustable dampers, Brembo brake system (painted in gold for the front) and Recaro seats.

The Mazda Roadster NR-A 'Jimba-Ittai' (マツダ ロードスター NR-A “人馬一体号”) is a race car with Enkei 16-inch alloy wheels, Bridgestone 16-inch tires, Bilstein dampers for a 20-millimeter lower vehicle height, Endless brake pads and TAKATA four-point seatbelts.

The vehicles were unveiled at the 2012 Tokyo Auto Salon.

MX-5 Miata Special Edition (2012)

The MX-5 Miata Special Edition is a limited (450 units) version of the USA Market 2012 MX-5 Miata with black-only PRHT, two new body (non-roof) colors (Pearl White and Velocity Red), new 17-inch black gunmetal alloy wheels, black exterior accents, black heated leather seats and piano black interior finishes, 6-speed manual transmission with short-throw shifter or 6-speed Sport automatic transmission with steering wheel-mounted paddle shifters, Premium and Suspension packages.

The vehicle was unveiled at the 2012 Chicago Auto Show.

MX-5 Venture Edition (2012)

The MX-5 Venture Edition is a limited (250 Soft-top, 550 Roadster Coupe) versions of the Mazda MX-5 with 1.8 MZR Soft-top (SE) and 2.0 MZR Roadster Coupe (Sport Tech) for the UK market. It includes Havana Brown heated leather seats, leather-wrapped steering wheel and hand brake with contrasting grey stitching, matching door trim, climate control air conditioning, piano black dashboard accents, alloy pedals, cruise control, satellite navigation system by Sanyo TomTom, choice of 3 body colors (Metropolitan Grey Mica, Ebony Mica, Crystal White Pearlescent), Dynamic Stability Control (DSC), a Traction Control System (TCS) and a limited-slip differential (Roadster Coupe only).

MX-5 "Yusho" (2012)

Introduced at the 2012 Leipzig Motor Show, the MX-5 "Yusho" is a limited version of the MX-5 with a supercharged 2.0-liter MZR petrol engine with a supercharger kit by Flyin' Miata and Cosworth pistons as well as connecting rods rated at 241 PS (177 kW; 238 hp) and 274 N⋅m (202 lb⋅ft) at 5,450 rpm, top speed of 240 km/h (149 mph), individually designed muffler with large cross sections and centrally positioned double tailpipes, 6-speed manual transmission with special sports clutch and shorter final drive ratio of 4.1, suspension with Bilstein shock absorbers, larger stabilizer bars and lowering springs from Eibach Federn; 8Jx17 anthracite gray alloy wheels with Toyo semi-slick tires, matte-white film wrapping and white-foiled rear spoiler, rear diffuser in carbon fiber-optics and the dark wheels, suede-trimmed steering wheel, Recaro sport seats with leather and Alcantara. Yusho is the Japanese word for victory.

Senshu MX-5 Roadster Coupe (2012)

The Senshu MX-5 is a limited (200 unit) version of the MX-5 with a Retractable Hard Top, 2.0-liter MZR petrol engine, 6-speed manual transmission and sport-line equipment built for the German market. It includes dark alloy wheels with 205/45R17 tires, a "racing stripe" Seitenfolierung, a black rear diffuser, sport exhaust tailpipes and a black bezel on the front grille, light-gray leather interior with embossed five-stage seat heating for driver and front passenger, accessory option include an iPod and USB adapter and lowering vehicle by 30 millimeters. Available body colors included Brilliant Black Metallic Arachneweiß Tornadoraot and metallic.

The model name was chosen by 9,600 Facebook users who had voted at the TV station DMAX. Other candidate names included "Arashi" and "Migoto".

MX-5 GT Concept (2012)

The MX-5 GT is a concept car inspired by the MX-5 GT race programme and built by Le Mans race specialist Jota Sport. Its powered by a normally aspirated 2.0-liter Mazda petrol engine rated at 205 bhp (153 kW), and includes a manual transmission, adjustable suspension, carbon front splitter, a rear diffuser and boot spoiler, sports exhaust system with a central tailpipe, Recaro seats, road slicks tires and body-colored roll hoops behind the seats.

The vehicle was unveiled at the 2012 Goodwood Festival of Speed.

MX-5 Kuro Edition (2012)

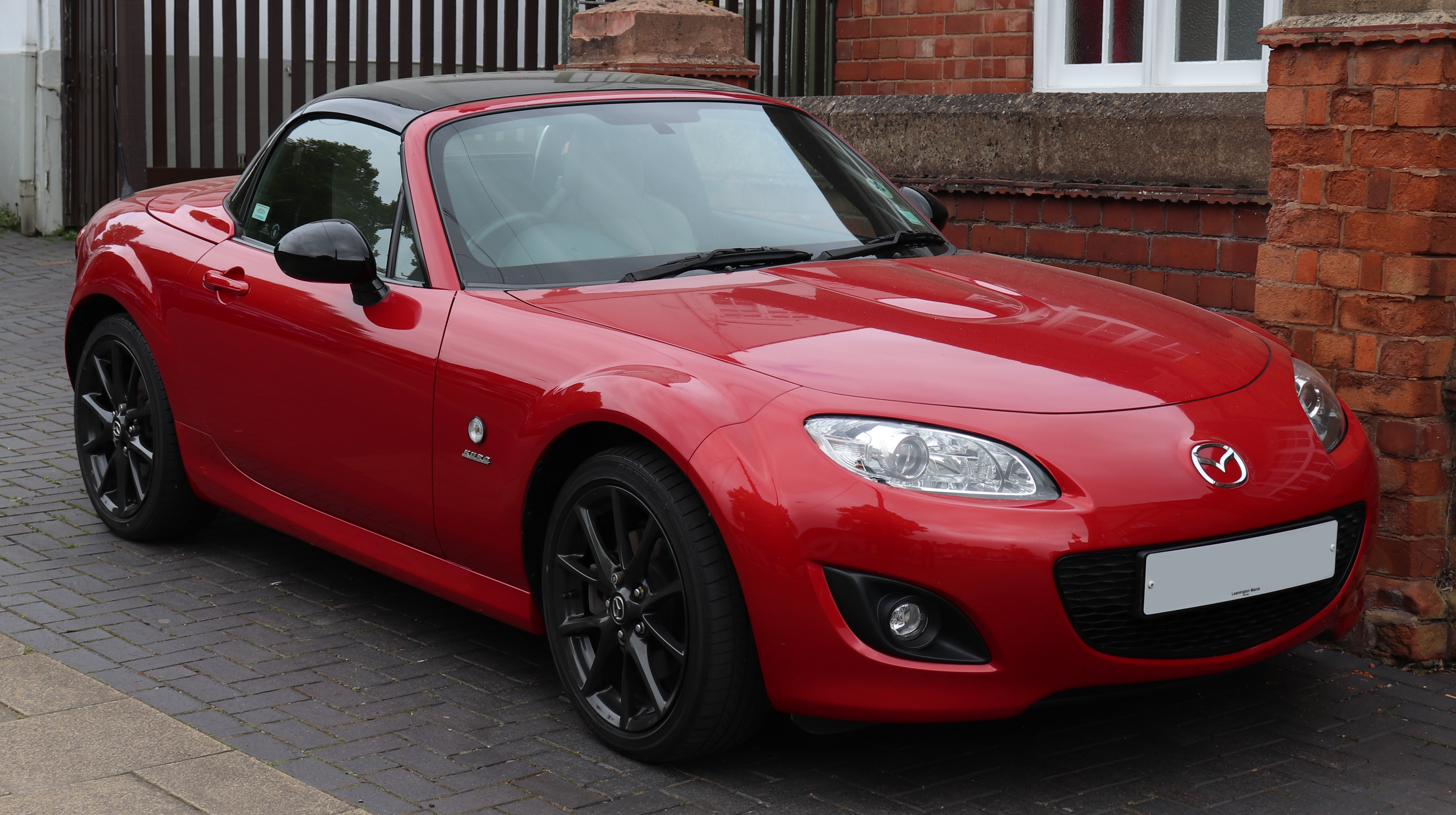
2012 Mazda MX-5 Kuro Edition

MX-5 Kuro are limited (200 soft-top, 400 Roadster Coupe) versions of MX-5 126PS 1.8i SE Soft-top and 160PS 2.0i Sport Tech Roadster Coupe, for the UK market. The Soft-top and Roadster Coupe included 5 and 6-speed manual transmissions respectively. They have a diffuser-style rear sports bumper, larger-diameter sports exhaust, unique race car inspired exterior graphics, Black detailing around the front grille and front fog lights, plus unique 'Kuro Edition' badging, Stone and Black heated leather seats, Stone leather door inserts with contrasting red stitching, a silver interior deco panel with red accents, alloy pedals, premium floor mats with race inspired logo and climate control air conditioning. Kuro is the Japanese word for black. The vehicles went on sale in July 2012.

=== Marketing ===
As part of the Roadster's 20th anniversary in Japan, Mazda held a special commemorative event on September 20, 2009, at its Miyoshi Proving Ground in western Japan. In addition, 200 MX-5s from Europe were gathered at 24 Hours of Le Mans. A "Best of Show" competition was held during the event with a special award going to the most beautiful MX-5.

== 2012 update (NC3) ==
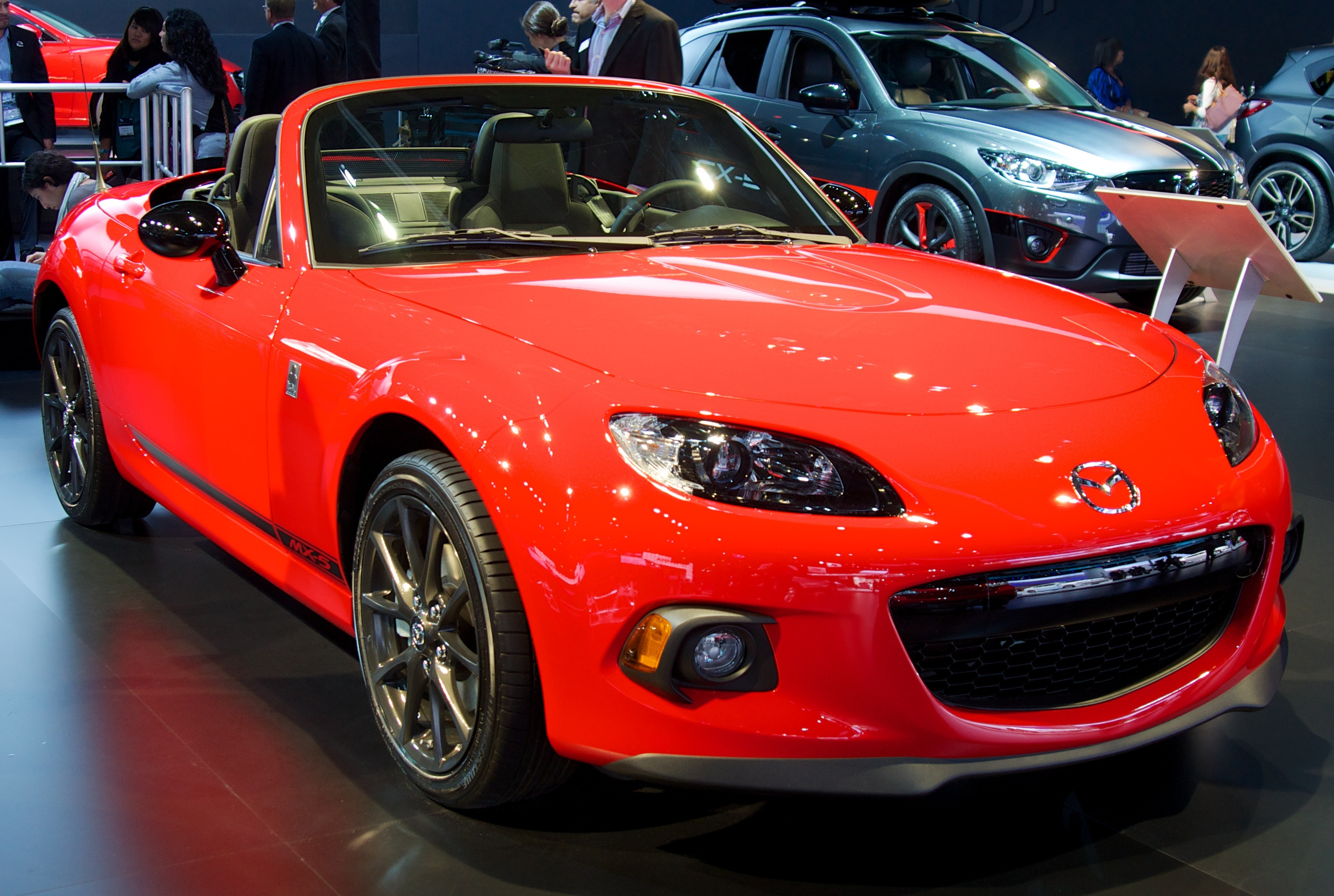
2013 Mazda Miata Club

In July 2012, for the 2013 model year, Mazda began using coordinated black and silver features to the respective soft-top and power retractable hardtop cars, a larger front bumper grille opening as well as a revised fog lamp design and new lip spoiler, a new luxury tan color interior option, Active Bonnet for pedestrian protection, a re-designed front bumper that reduced weight, and new 17-inch aluminum wheels. While no modifications were done to the powerplant, Mazda did retune the ECU on the manual transmission MX-5 to provide a more linear throttle response. Braking performance has also been altered, with the brake booster being modified to better modulate braking performance on the roadster. U.S. market Touring trim was replaced by Club trim with addition of black headlamps, black side mirror covers, 17x7-inch gun metal black alloy wheels, Bilstein dampers, limited-slip differential, body color dash trim, red stitched black cloth seats, MX-5 decals, and more pronounced front and rear aerodynamic splitters. Colors for the new Club trim were limited to True Red, Brilliant Black, Crystal White Pearl, and Liquid Silver Metallic. There are only two choices for tops: black cloth top or black PRHT. The suspension tuning, dampers and differential from the Club trim could be optioned on the Grand Touring trim as the available Suspension Package.

The Japanese market model went on sale in Mazda and Mazda Anfini dealers.

=== Special editions (2013—2014) ===
BBR Mazda MX-5 GT270 (2013)

Brodie Brittain Racing (BBR) of Brackley, England, is providing a limited-edition run of 100 cars modified with an intercooled turbocharger, remapped ECU, and suspension upgrades. Available for the 2.0-liter Sport Tech Roadster Coupe models, this package increases power output to 200 kW (268 bhp). The top speed is limited to 240 km/h (150 mph), with 0–97 km/h (0–60 mph) approached in 4.9 seconds. At launch, the price of the package, including for the car, is £29,995, and comes with a 12-month warranty.

Jota MX-5 GT (2013)

The Jota is a production version of the 2012 MX-5 GT Concept car, built in Kent by Jota Sport. It went on sale in March 2014 and was available exclusively from approved Mazda dealer, Lodge Garage, in the UK.

Based on the 2013 Sport Tech Roadster Coupe, it includes a modified, normally aspirated 2.0-liter Mazda petrol engine rated at 151 kW (203 bhp), remapped ECU, 6-speed manual transmission, adjustable lowered suspension, carbon fibre front splitter, carbon fibre rear diffuser, carbon fibre boot spoiler, sports exhaust system with twin central tailpipes, Brilliant Black A-Pillars, Roof Panels and Mirror Covers, Brilliant Black headlights, 17-inch Anthracite alloy wheels, "Jota" side decals, heated Recaro sport seats with leather and Alcantara, Brilliant Black roll-over bar covers, drilled aluminum pedals, "Jota" floor mats, and a unique identification plaque.

With a 0–97 km/h (0–60 mph) acceleration time of 6.4 seconds, it cut 1.5 seconds off the standard car's time.

Each car came with the standard three-year Mazda warranty with after sales support throughout the Mazda dealer network.

Only 4 units were made, two press cars and two production units. Since then, the two press cars have been converted back to Recaro editions.

At a price of £29,995 and limited availability, only 2 units exist today.

MX-5 25th Anniversary Edition (2014)

The 25th Anniversary Model is a limited (1099 units) version of the MX-5 PRHT with a 2.0L engine, designed to celebrate 25 years of the MX-5. All cars are painted in an exclusive color, Soul Red Metallic, and have Brilliant Black A-pillars, roof panels and mirror covers. Other additions include 17-inch Dark Gunmetal alloy wheels, a rear diffuser, and chrome exhaust trim; each car also has unique, limited edition numbered external badging. Interior changes include Light Stone heated leather seats featuring embossed 25th anniversary logos in the headrests with contrasting red stitching. This contrasting stitching continues on the steering wheel, gear stick boot and handbrake lever. Each car also has special 25th anniversary logo scuff plates on the door sills, a Dark Red hand painted decoration panel on the dash, Brilliant Black roll-over bar covers, and drilled aluminum pedals. This model went on sale on August 1, 2014, in the UK; it sold out in the U.S. within 10 minutes. It has the following engine enhancements: matched pistons, a lightened flywheel and forged crankshaft. Suspension includes Bilstein shock absorbers on manual versions only.

== Technical specifications (UK) ==
Drivetrain specifications by generation (UK market)
Calendar year(s)	Model no(s).	Chassis code(s)	Engine type	Engine code	Transmission(s)	Power@rpm	Torque@rpm
2005–	2.0i	NC	2.0 L inline-4	MZR I4 (LF-VE)	5 or 6-speed MT	125 kW (167 hp)	190 N⋅m (140 lb⋅ft)
2006–	1.8i	NC	1.8 L inline-4	MZR I4 (L8-DE)	5-speed MT	94 kW (126 hp)	167 N⋅m (123 lb⋅ft)
2008–	2.0i	NC	2.0 L inline-4	MZR I4 (LF-VE)	5 or 6-speed MT	125 kW (167 hp)	190 N⋅m (140 lb⋅ft)
2009–	Superlight 1.8i	NC	1.8 L inline-4	MZR I4 (L8-DE)	5-speed MT	92 kW (124 hp)	167 N⋅m (123 lb⋅ft)
2013–	Jota 2.0i	NC	2.0 L inline-4	MZR I4 (LF-VE)	6-speed MT	151 kW (203 hp)	217 N⋅m (160 lb⋅ft)

== Transmissions ==
=== U.S. ===
Model	SV	Sport	Club	Grand Touring
Base	5-speed manual	5-speed manual	6-speed manual	6-speed manual
Optional	-	6-speed automatic Sport with Adaptive Shift Logic and paddle shifters		

=== Canada ===
Model	GX	GS	GT
Base	5-speed manual	6-speed manual	6-speed manual
Optional	6-speed automatic	6-speed automatic with lock-up torque converter and paddle shifters	

== Motorsport ==
In August 2019 in the United States, Mazda Motorsports and Winding Road Racing announced Spec MX-5, a racing class structure based around the MX-5 NC that is designed to be an affordable, tech-able, reliable and fun-to-drive option for club racers. Race cars in the division will have Roush Performance cylinder heads, Penske Racing shocks, Eibach springs and sway bars, Pagid brake pads, Toyo tires, and more, and will have a curb weight of 2,500 lb (1,100 kg). Spec MX-5 will have select events starting in 2020.

== Reception ==
The third generation MX-5 was met with positive reviews. Jeremy Clarkson, in his "Driving" column of The Sunday Times, wrote that the MX-5 "represents better value for money than any other car on sale in Britain today." He went on to say: "You waste your money on a Mustang or a Ferrari. The fact is that if you want a sports car, the MX-5 is perfect. Nothing on the road will give you better value. Nothing will give you so much fun. The only reason I'm giving it five stars is because I can't give it 14."

Sam Philip of Top Gear magazine gave the car a score of seven out of 10, saying that "if it’s rear-drive retro you need, the Mazda would like to remind you it’s still got its groove on…"

Jack Baruth of Road & Track praised the value of late-model MX-5 NCs for their reliability and affordability compared to NA and NB models.

== Accolades ==
- 2005-2006 Car of the Year Japan Award.
- Car and Driver's 10Best list from 2006 to 2013.
- 2006 World Car of the Year Awards: "World Car of the Year" Finalist.
- 2012 Autocar Indonesia Reader's Choice Award, Favorite Convertible.
- What Car? Magazine 2014 Used Car of the Year - Best Fun Car.
