= Ford Laser =

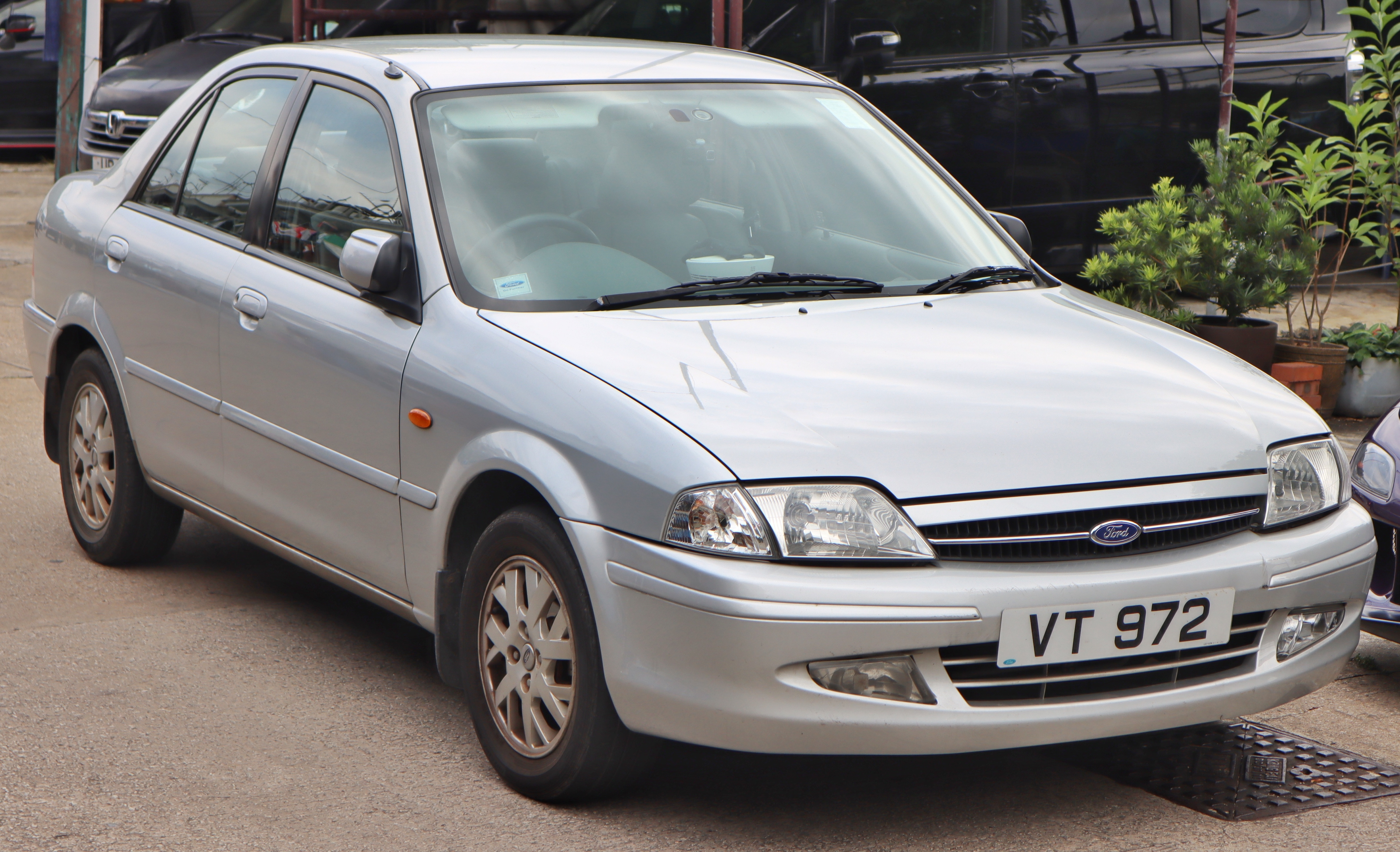

Overview
- Manufacturer: Ford
- Also called: Ford Meteor (Australia & South Africa); Ford Liata/ Ford Aztec/ Ford Activa/ Ford Tierra (Taiwan); Ford Lynx (Philippines/Malaysia)
- Production: 1981–2005
- Assembly: Taiwan: Taoyuan City (Ford Lio Ho, CKD); Malaysia: Shah Alam, Selangor; Indonesia: Jakarta (IRMC); Vietnam: Hai Duong; Thailand: Rayong (AAT); Australia: Flemington; Japan: Hofu (Mazda); New Zealand: Wiri; Philippines: Santa Rosa, Laguna; Venezuela: Valencia, Colombia: Bogotá; South Africa: Pretoria; Zimbabwe: Willowvale

Body and chassis
- Class: Subcompact car (1981–1994); Compact car (1994–2005)
- Layout: Front-engine, front-wheel-drive; Front-engine, all-wheel-drive
- Related: Ford Capri; Ford Escort (Gen 2 & Gen 3 only); Mazda Familia/323; Mercury Capri; Mercury Tracer

Chronology
- Predecessor: Ford Escort
- Successor: Ford Focus; Ford Escort (China & Taiwan)

The Ford Laser is a compact car, originally a subcompact car in the first three generations, which was sold by Ford in Asia, Oceania, and parts of South America and Africa. It has generally been available as a sedan or hatchback, although convertible, wagon and pick-up versions have also been available in different markets. The sedan, and briefly station wagon, versions were badged Ford Laser and Meteor in Australia between 1982 and 1987. The Ford Meteor name was also used in South Africa.

The Ford Laser was a restyled version of the Familia/323 models produced by Mazda in Japan from 1980 onwards. Ford had acquired a 25% stake in Mazda in 1979.

Platform and assembly-line sharing with the locally produced Mazda Familia in Japan allowed the Laser in that market to be offered with a plethora of engine, paint and trim configurations not available anywhere else in the world. This was most notably evident during the 1980s with multiple turbocharged variants, unique bodyshells such as the cabriolet, and full-time 4WD models all available years before their debuts in other markets (and in some cases, never making it offshore at all). Along with the Japanese produced Ford Telstar and Ford Festiva, the Laser was sold at special Autorama dealerships.

In Australia and New Zealand, where Ford was seen as a local brand, the locally assembled Laser outsold its Mazda twin, the 323, especially in Australia, where the 323 was imported. According to research carried out by Ford Australia in 1984, a third of Laser buyers were unaware that the Ford model was based on the Mazda 323.

However, in neighbouring Asian markets, such as Singapore, Malaysia, Indonesia, and Hong Kong, as well as Japan itself, the reverse was the case, although pooling resources with Mazda allowed Ford to maintain a foothold in the region. This was also the case in South America, South Africa, and the Caribbean, where the Laser was also sold, in many cases being locally assembled.

== First generation (KA/KB; 1981) ==
First generation (KA/KB)
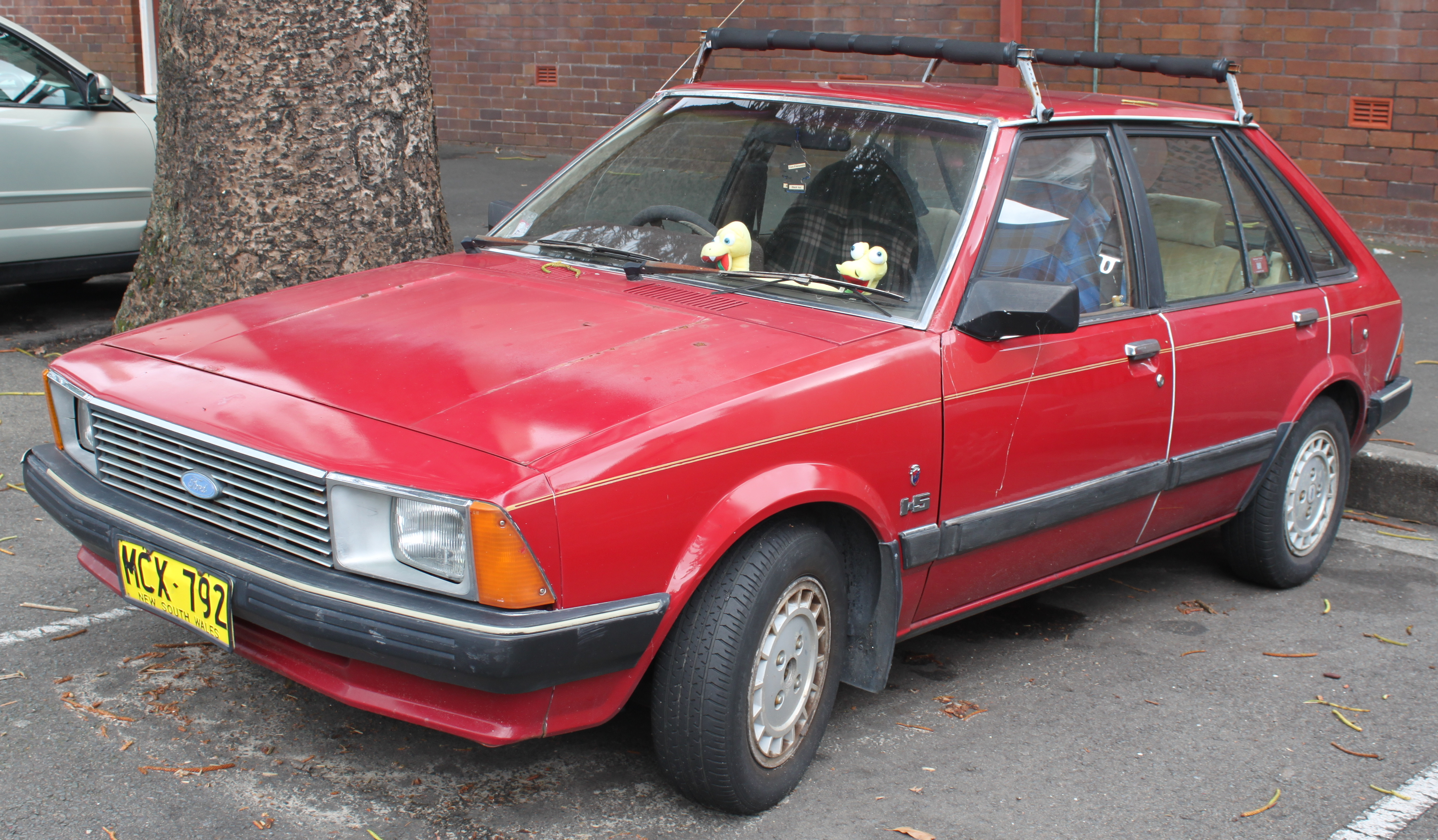
- Ford Laser (KA) Ghia 5-door

Overview
- Also called: Ford Meteor (sedan)
- Production: 1981–1985 (Laser); 1982–1985 (Meteor)

Body and chassis
- Body style: 3-door hatchback 4-door sedan 5-door hatchback
- Related: Mazda Familia/323 (BD)

Powertrain
- Engine: 1.1 L E1 I4; 1.3 L E3 I4; 1.5 L E5 I4; 1.5 L E5T turbo I4
- Transmission: 4/5-speed manual 3-speed automatic

=== Laser (KA/KB) ===
The KA Laser (Australian model code), built under license from Mazda, was introduced in March 1981, replacing the rear-wheel-drive Escort in Australia. The range was available as a hatchback, in both three- and five-door varieties, as well as a four-door sedan badged Ford Meteor. Originally sold only with the 1.3-litre engine, the smaller 1.1-litre engine was never available in Australia. Later, 1.5-litre versions were added, eventually even a turbocharged version. In January 1983, the Laser underwent a facelift to become the KB. Light changes were made to the rear, while the front was redesigned in a more modern style, aligning it with Ford's corporate look of the era.

In Japan this is referred to as the "BE" Laser, which was identical to the Australian KB series. The BE model code relates to the BD model code used for the corresponding Familia/323. The first Lasers went on sale in Japan in late 1982. Fuel-injection and a 115 PS turbocharged model were added in July 1983; these variants were never offered for sale outside Japan.

Aside from being built in Australia and Japan, Lasers were also assembled in New Zealand at Ford's Wiri plant in Auckland, replacing the Mk2 Escort. In New Zealand, the Laser was sold as both a hatchback and sedan, the Meteor name not being used in that market, and was later joined by the Mazda 323 at the renamed Vehicle Assemblers of New Zealand (VANZ) plant in Wiri, Auckland in a joint venture between Ford New Zealand and Mazda. 323s initially had been assembled at the Motor Industries International plant in Otahuhu, subsequently taken over by Mazda New Zealand. New Zealand-built Ford Laser hatchbacks were available with the 1.1-litre (base and Ritz), 1.3-litre (GL), and 1.5-litre (Sport) engines, while the Laser sedan (base, L, Ghia) was available with the 1.1-, 1.3 and 1.5-litre engines respectively, with the Ghia having an automatic transmission option.

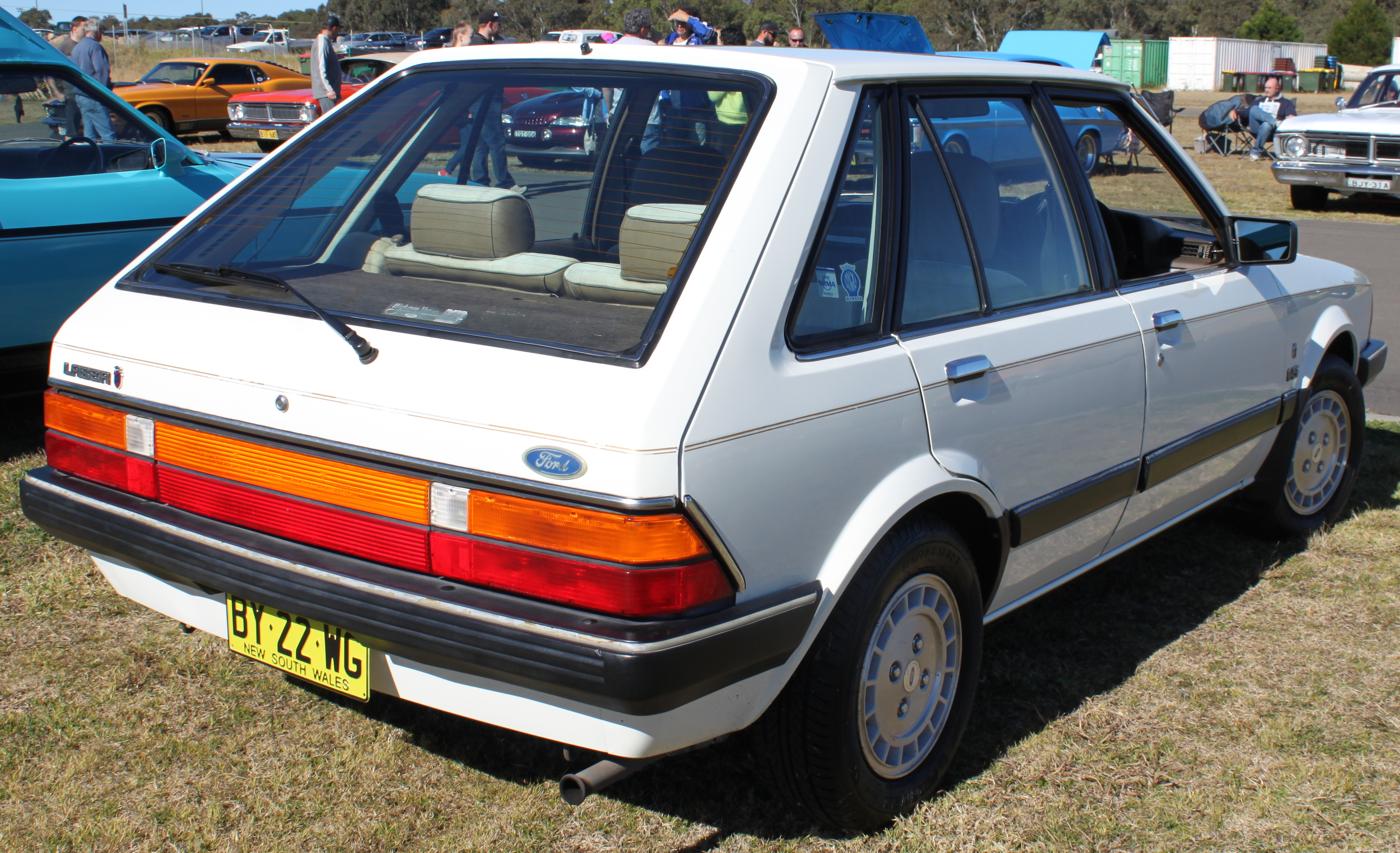
Ford Laser (KA) Ghia 5-door

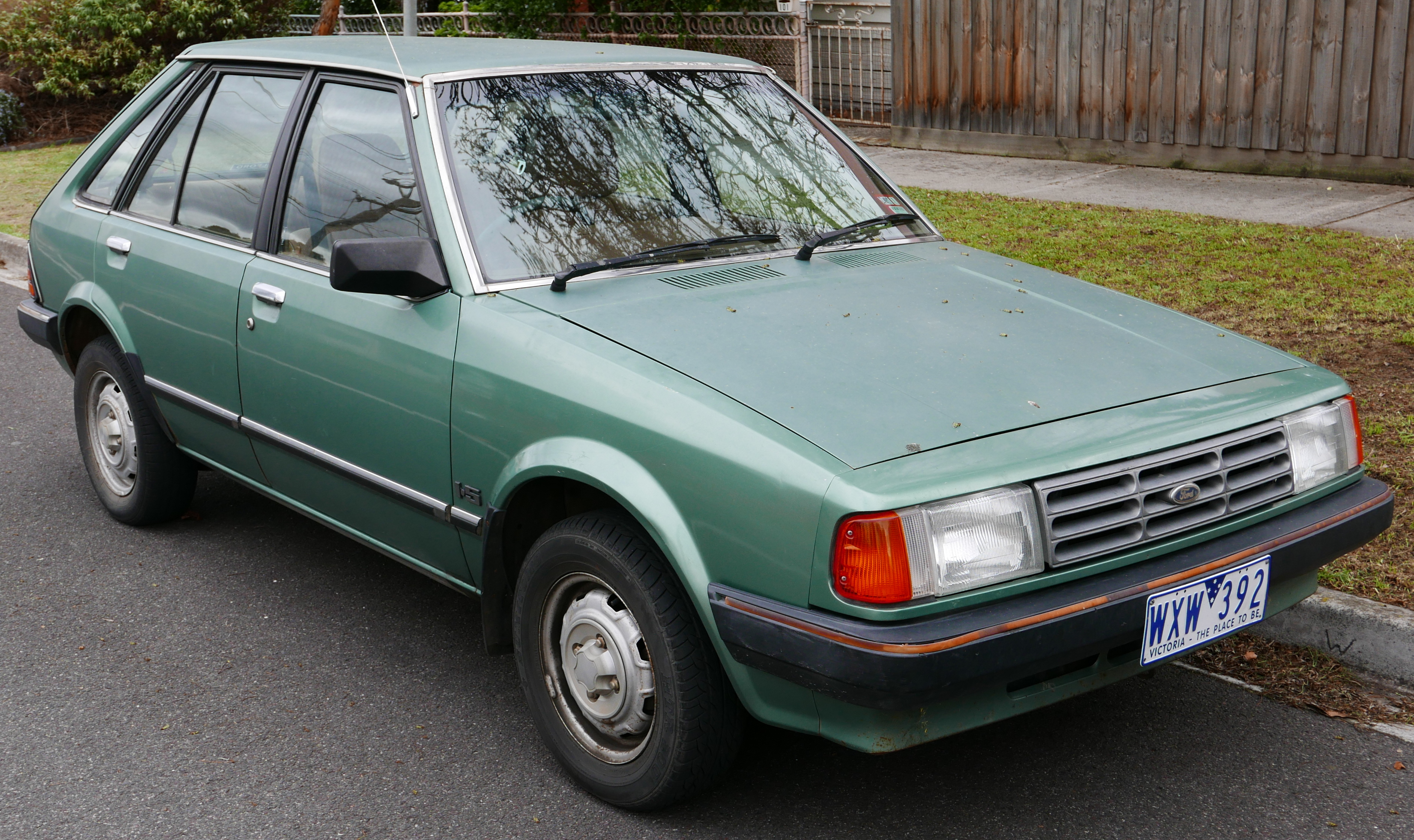

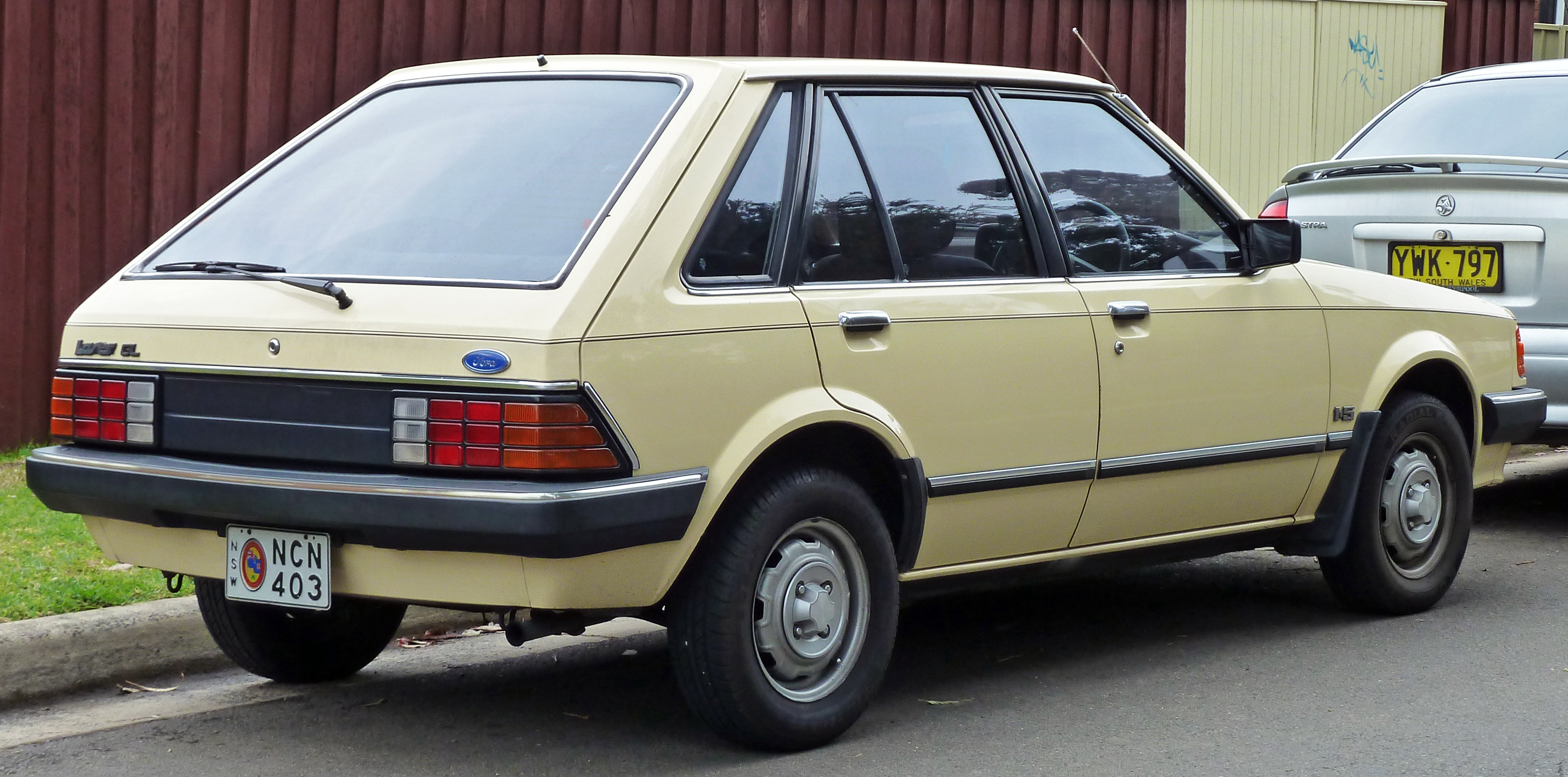
Ford Laser (KB) GL 5-door

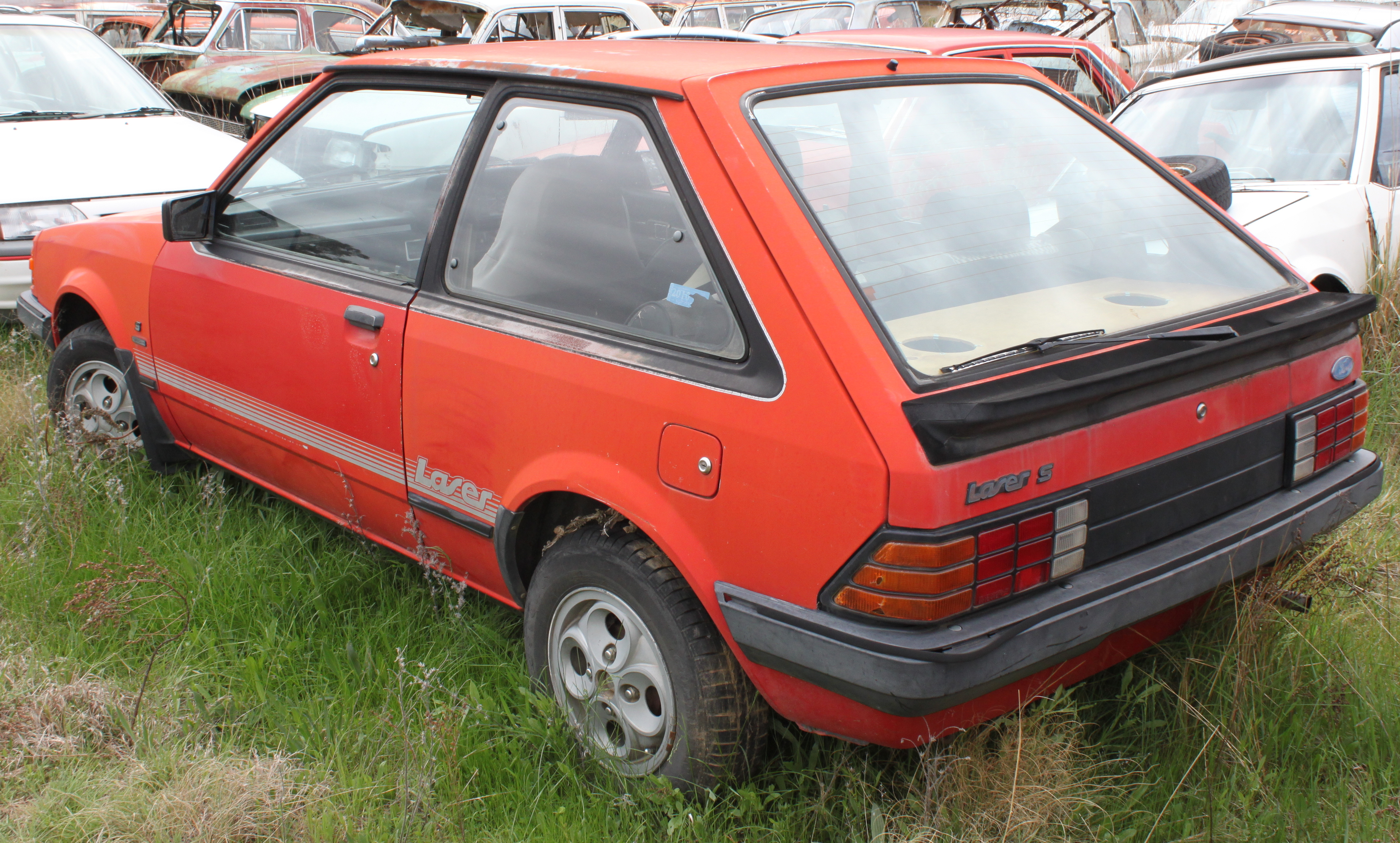
Ford Laser (KB) S 3-door

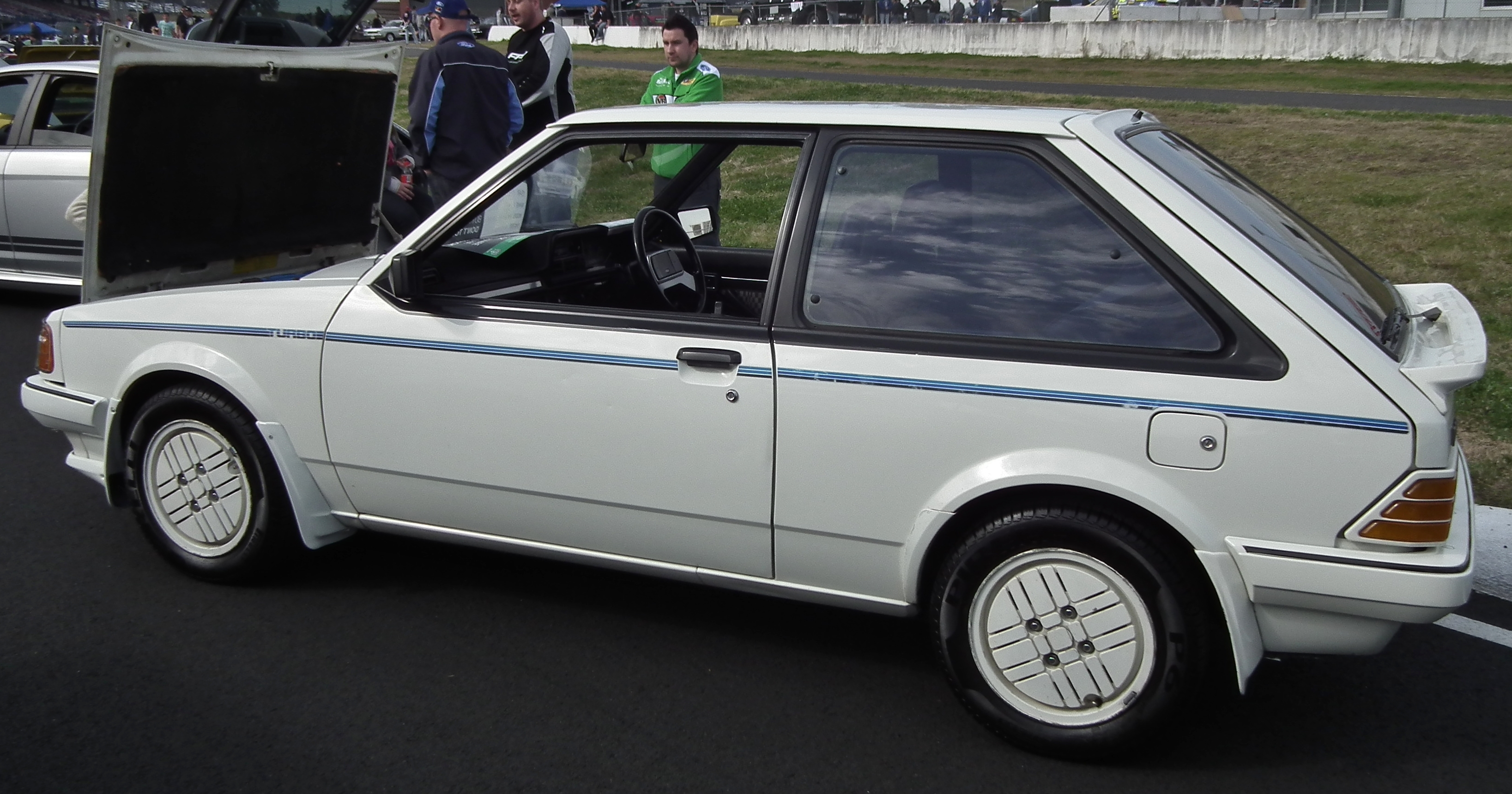
Ford Laser (KB) Turbo

The Laser was also sold in some countries in Latin America, including Argentina. This was identical to the KA version sold in Australia. In Mexico, however, the first-generation Laser had a front end similar to the North American Mazda GLC. In addition, it was sold in right hand drive markets in the Caribbean such as Jamaica and Trinidad and Tobago, where it was locally assembled.

Assembly of the Laser also occurred in Malaysia and Indonesia (in right hand drive) and in left hand drive for markets like Taiwan and the Philippines. In Taiwan, it was assembled using complete knock-down kits from 1981 via the local joint venture Ford Lio Ho.

The Laser was also introduced in Zimbabwe in 1981, the first Ford model to be sold in the country for fourteen years, after the imposition of sanctions on the then Rhodesia after its Unilateral Declaration of Independence. It was assembled at the state-owned Willowvale Motor Industries plant, in Harare, alongside the Mazda 323.

- Mazda E1, 41 kW (55 hp) 1.1-litre, carburettor, 8-valve, SOHC (Base/Ritz, trim levels in New Zealand)
- Mazda E3, 49 kW (66 hp) 1.3-litre carburettor, 8-valve, SOHC (L and GL in NZ)
- Mazda E5, 54 kW (72 hp) 1.5-litre carburettor, 8-valve, SOHC (L & GL [Australia] and Ghia [NZ and Australia])
- Mazda E5, 59 kW (79 hp) 1.5-litre twin-carburettor, 8-valve, SOHC (Sport)
- Mazda E5T, 78 kW (105 hp) 1.5-litre carburettor, 8-valve, SOHC, turbocharged (limited edition Turbo trim level, 300 produced)
- Mazda E5T, 85 kW (114 hp) 1.5-litre, electronic fuel injection, 8-valve SOHC, turbocharged (Turbo trim level in Japan)

=== Meteor (GA/GB) ===
Introduced in April 1982, Ford Meteor was the name given to the sedan version of the Laser. Designated as the GA series, the Meteor featured conventional three-box styling with a 60/40 folding rear seat to increase luggage capacity that was already considered "very large for the class". Compared to the Laser, the front seats could be moved back a little further at the expense of rear seat passengers. To further improve practicality, the Meteor's spare wheel could be relocated from the floor to an upright position to increase boot depth from 410 to 585 millimetres (16.1 to 23.0 in). The additional length of 195 millimetres (7.7 in) over the Laser hatchback was used by Ford Australia to justify the Meteor as replacement to the TF Cortina. In Australia, the Meteor was only available with the 1.5-litre engine and five-speed manual transmission or optional three-speed automatic. Consequently, the Meteor had a difficult undertaking replacing the Cortina, which offered engine displacements from 2.0 litres for the inline-four, up to a 4.1-litre inline-six, plus a station wagon option. However, the Meteor's pitch as the Cortina replacement was merely a temporary measure prior to the introduction of the Telstar mid-sized sedan and hatchback in May 1983. In Australia, the Meteor directly competed against the Holden Camira.

The Meteor's front styling and grille differed from the corresponding Laser. The Meteor styling was based on the Japanese market Mazda Familia (BD) sedan. Lighting changes included the replacement of the Laser's amber front turn signals with clear lenses, plus the fitment of larger, flush headlamps over the Laser's smaller lights that were "sunken" into an enclosure. The Meteor grille had more of an "eggcrate" pattern than the plain black slats of the Laser. Suspension was fully independent with coil springs.

Trim levels in Australia comprised the entry-level GL and upmarket Ghia, both available with an optional "S" pack that added full instrumentation and upgraded tyres. Steel wheels with bright metal trim rings differentiated the GL from the Ghia with its alloy wheels and deep side protection mouldings.

The mid-term facelifted model of May 1983, coded GB, brought the range closer together, though Meteors continued as a separate and slightly more premium line.

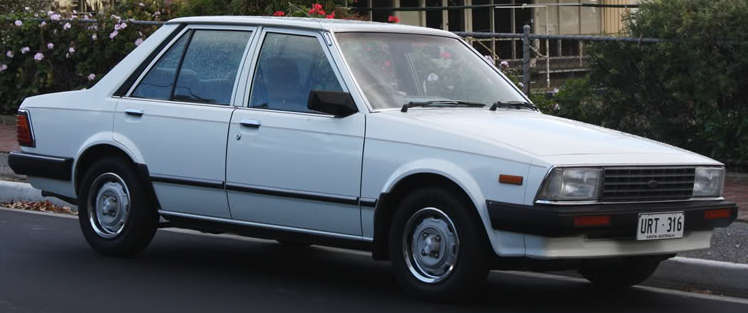
Ford Meteor (GA) GL sedan

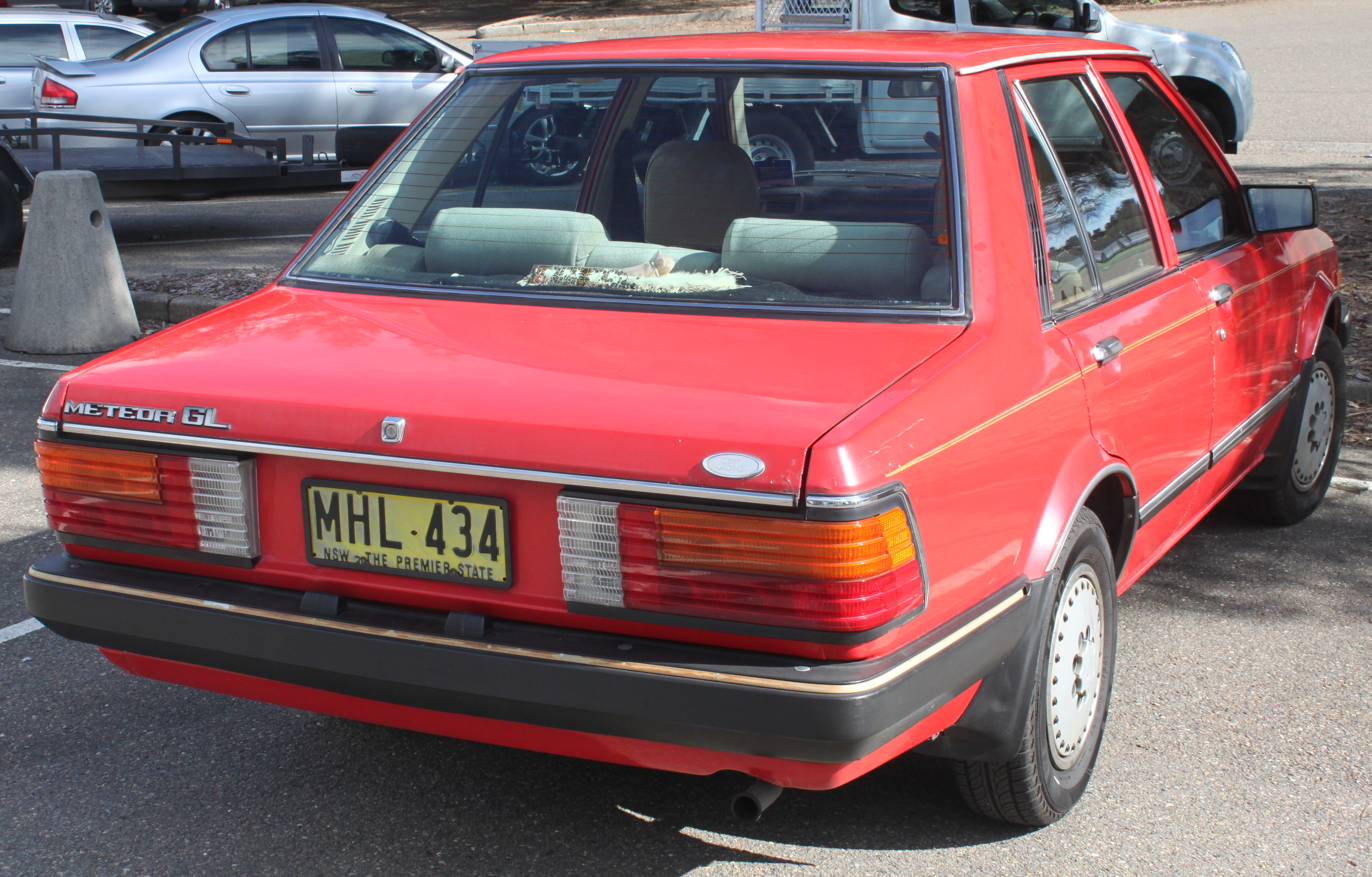
Ford Meteor (GA) GL sedan

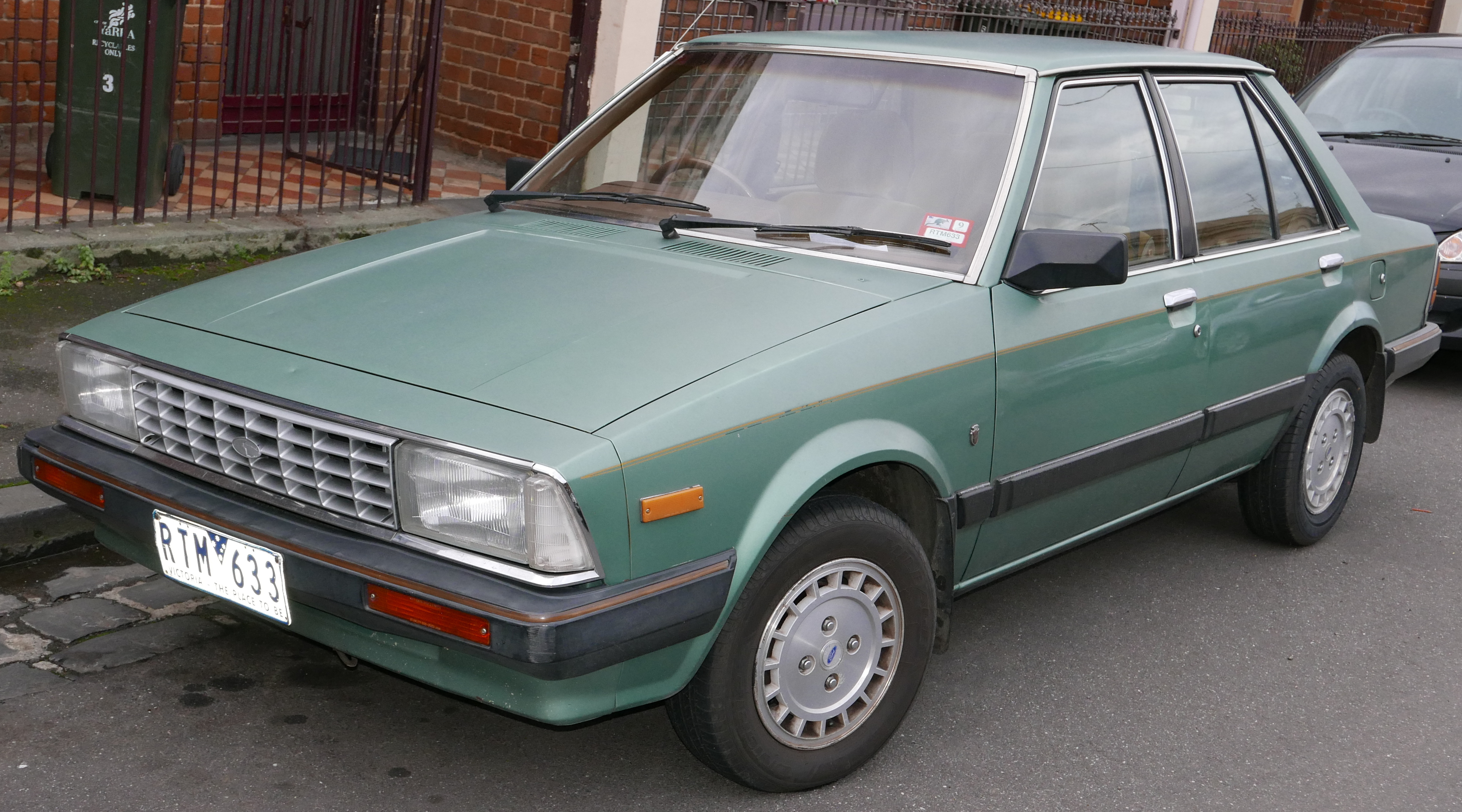
Ford Meteor (GB) Ghia sedan

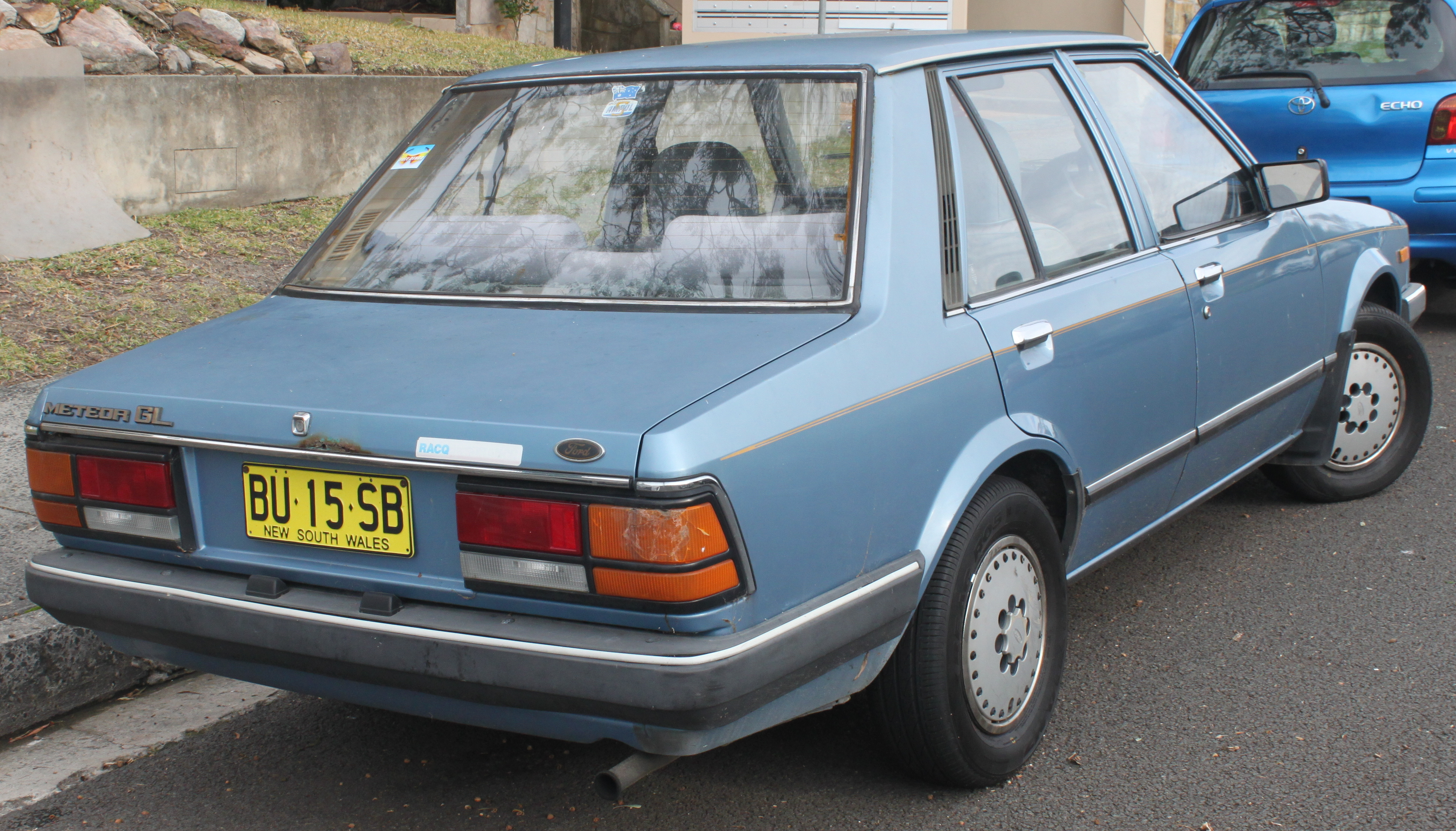
Ford Meteor (GB) GL sedan

== Second generation (BF/KC/KE; 1985) ==
Second generation (BF/KC/KE)
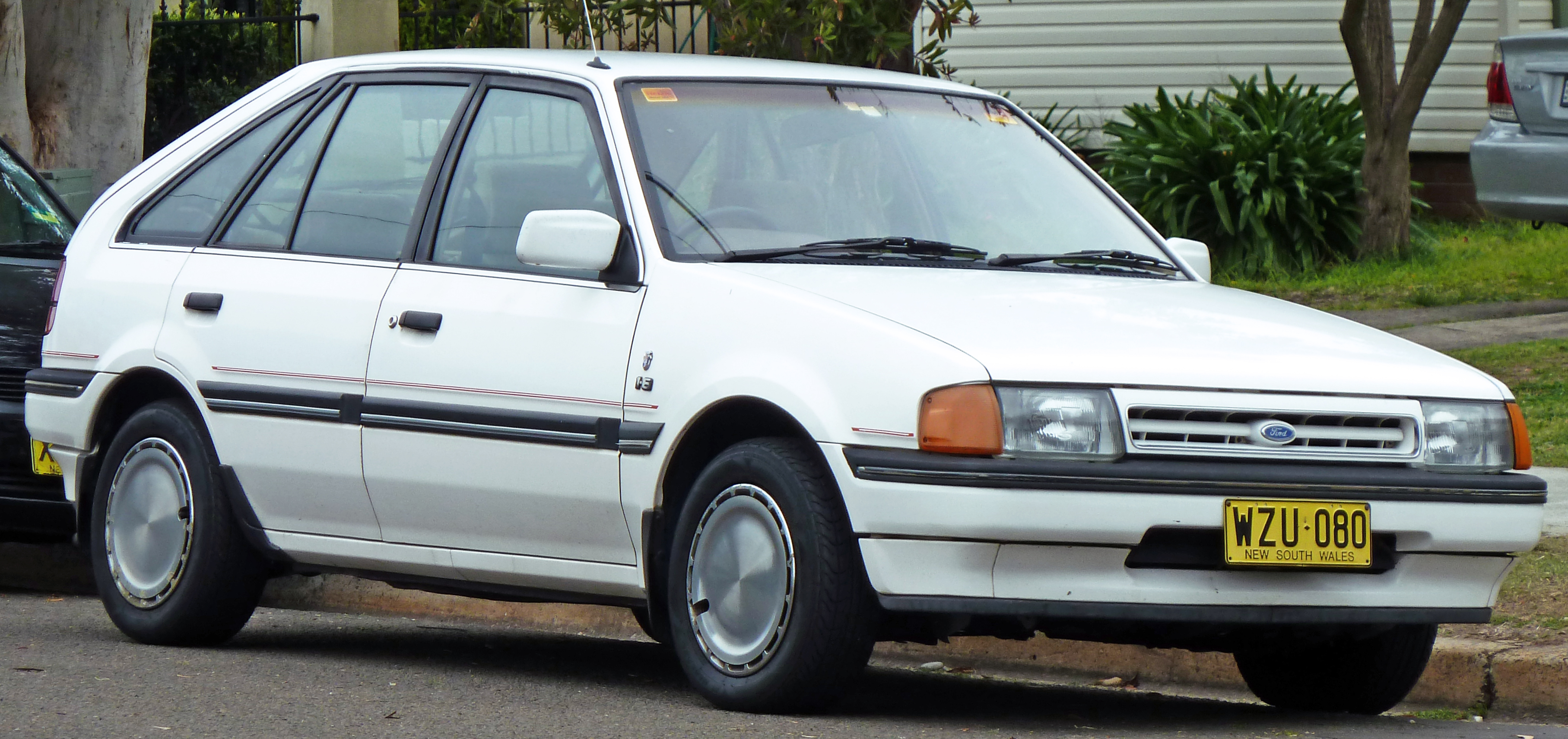
- Ford Laser (KC) Ghia 5-door

Overview
- Also called: Ford Meteor; Ford Tonic; Ford Tracer; Ford Bantam; Mazda Familia; Mazda 323; Mazda Rustler; Mercury Tracer; Sao Penza
- Production: Japan: 1985–1989; Australia: 1985–1990 (sedan, hatchback); Australia: 1986–1994 (wagon); New Zealand: 1986–1996 (wagon); South Africa: 1986–2003; Indonesia: 1986–1997; Taiwan: 1986–1990; Mexico: 1987–1989

Body and chassis
- Body style: 2-door cabriolet; 2-door coupe utility; 3-door hatchback; 4-door sedan; 5-door hatchback; 5-door station wagon

Powertrain
- Engine: Petrol: 1.3 L B3 I4; 1.3 L E3 I4; 1.4 L CVH I4 (ZA); 1.5 L B5 I4; 1.5 L E5/E5F I4; 1.5 L E5T I4 turbo; 1.6 L B6/B6F SOHC I4; 1.6 L B6D DOHC I4; 1.6 L B6T DOHC turbo I4; 1.6 L CVH I4 (ZA); 1.6 L F6 I4; 2.0 L FE SOHC I4; 2.0 L FE DOHC I4; Diesel: 1.7 L PN I4
- Transmission: 3-speed automatic (E/PN/B5 engines only); 4-speed automatic (B6 engine only); 4-speed manual (E3 engine only); 5-speed manual (all engines)

Dimensions
- Wheelbase: 2,400 mm (94.5 in)
- Length: 3,390 mm (133.5 in) (cabriolet/hatchback); 4,195 mm (165.2 in) (sedan); 4,225 mm (166.3 in) (wagon)
- Width: 1,645 mm (64.8 in)
- Height: 1,380 mm (54.3 in) (cabriolet); 1,390 mm (54.7 in) (sedan/hatchback); 1,430 mm (56.3 in) (wagon)
- Curb weight: 825–1,000 kg (1,819–2,205 lb) (hatchback); 1,090–1,175 kg (2,403–2,590 lb) (TX3 Turbo AWD); 865–1,070 kg (1,907–2,359 lb) (sedan); 910–1,020 kg (2,006–2,249 lb) (wagon); 1,090–1,110 kg (2,403–2,447 lb) (cabriolet)

=== Japan ===
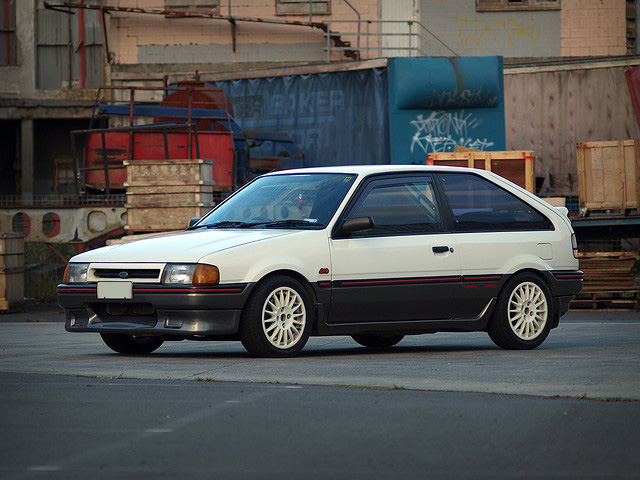
Ford Laser TX3 AWD Turbo

January 1985 saw the advent of the BF series Laser in Japan. This was the Laser's first major redesign. For the first time a diesel version was offered in Japan, as well as a factory two-door cabriolet with 1.5-litre turbo engine, a 1.6-litre DOHC 16-valve Sport version, and a potent 140 PS DOHC turbo model with full-time 4WD drivetrain (identical to the contemporary Mazda Familia BFMR). AWD models for sedan and wagon/van were also available for sale. This added up to an extremely convoluted Japanese product line, which was later streamlined in 1987 with a mid-life model refresh (KE series in other markets). This refresh dropped E-series engines in favour of all-new B-series equivalents, poorer-selling variants were discontinued, and minor changes were made to exterior styling and interior trim. The commercial van model was available until 1994, sold together with next generation Laser.

=== Australia and New Zealand ===
For Australia, the range was known as the KC Laser and GC Meteor, launched in October 1985. All body styles were carried over, with the addition of a station wagon (badged as "Meteor", like the sedan) from 1986. A new "TX3" variant, which was at the top of the "Laser" models in specification level and designated "KC2", replaced the "Sport" variant from the KB series. Unlike the Sport, the TX3 was only available as a three-door (the Taiwanese TX3 was available in a five-door version only). The "L" and "GL" models were no longer available as a three-door. A notable change was the introduction of engines capable of running on 91 RON unleaded petrol (this became mandatory in Australia from 1986).

The E5 1.5-litre SOHC carburettored engine that was optional on GL, and standard on Ghia in the KB series was replaced with the new B6 1.6-litre I4 SOHC. For the first time, electronic fuel injection was available as an option on Ghia models, and was standard on TX3 models. Buyers who ordered automatic transmission with this engine received an electronically controlled four-speed unit, which was quite advanced for a small car in 1985. The B3 I4 SOHC 1.3-litre engine was standard on the "L" (hatchback only, the wagon had a 1.6-litre engine). The 1.6-litre engine was standard on GL, Ghia and TX3, though some early GL models were equipped with a 1.5-litre SOHC carburettored.

The KC/KE Laser wagon was also assembled in New Zealand, alongside its Mazda 323 equivalent, until Ford closed their VANZ assembly plant at Wiri, Auckland in 1996.

KC / GC model range (Australia):

- Laser L
- Laser GL
- Laser Ghia
- Laser TX3
- Meteor L (wagon only)
- Meteor GL
- Meteor Ghia
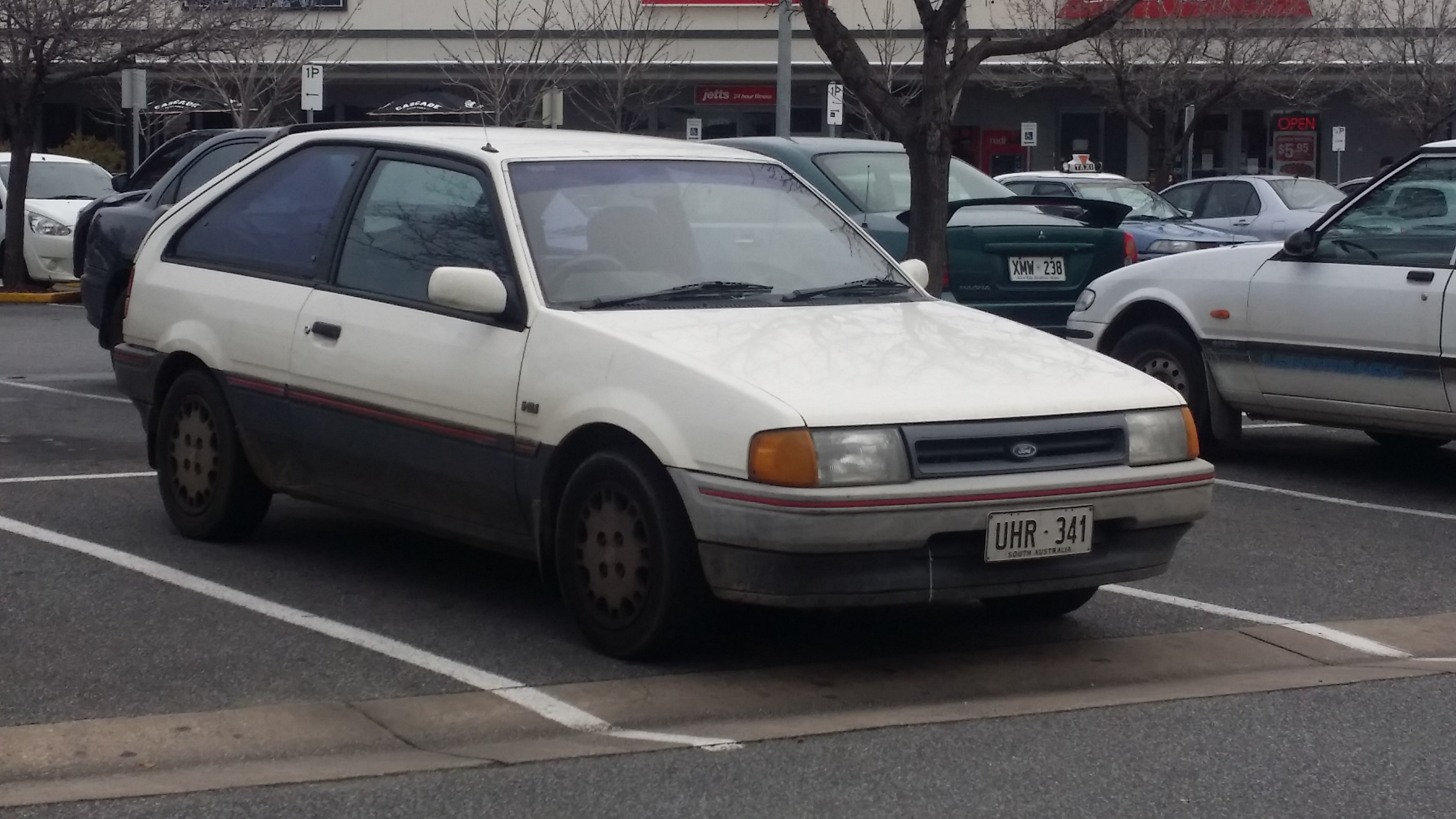
Ford Laser (KC) TX3 3-door

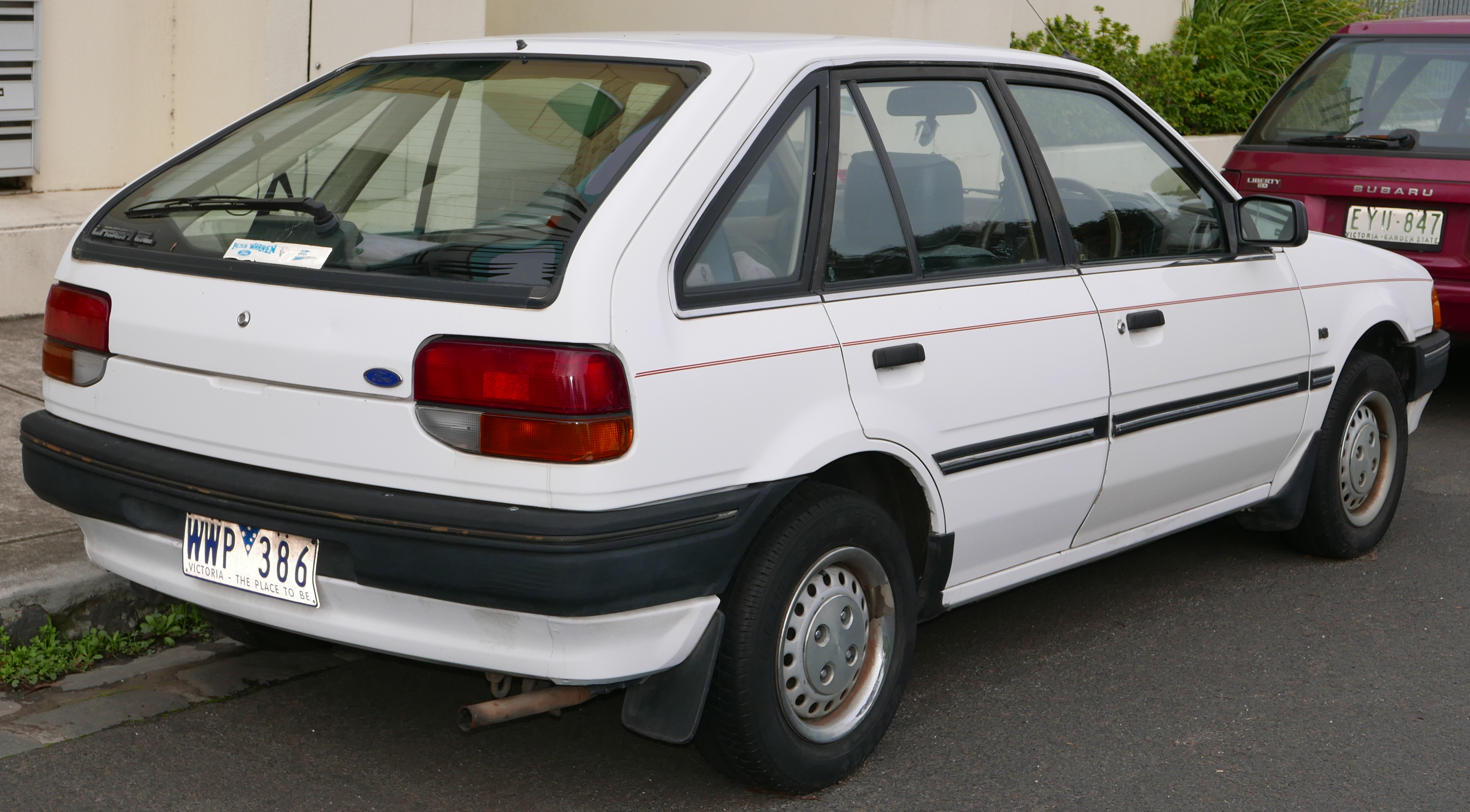
Ford Laser (KC) GL 5-door

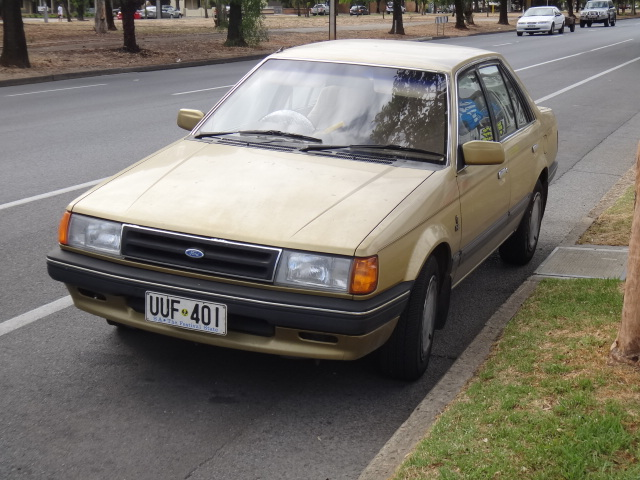
Ford Meteor (GC) Ghia sedan

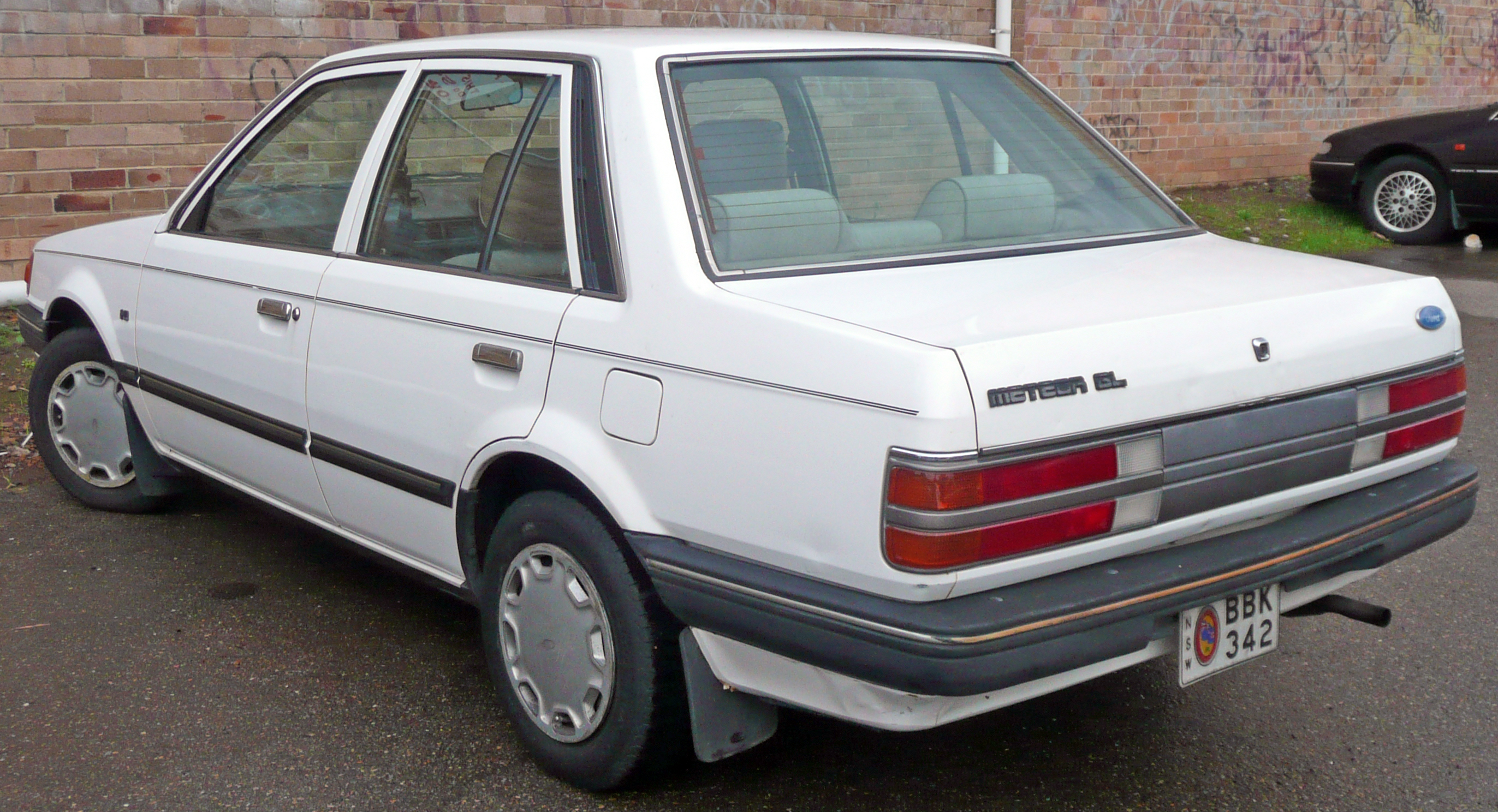
Ford Meteor (GC) GL sedan

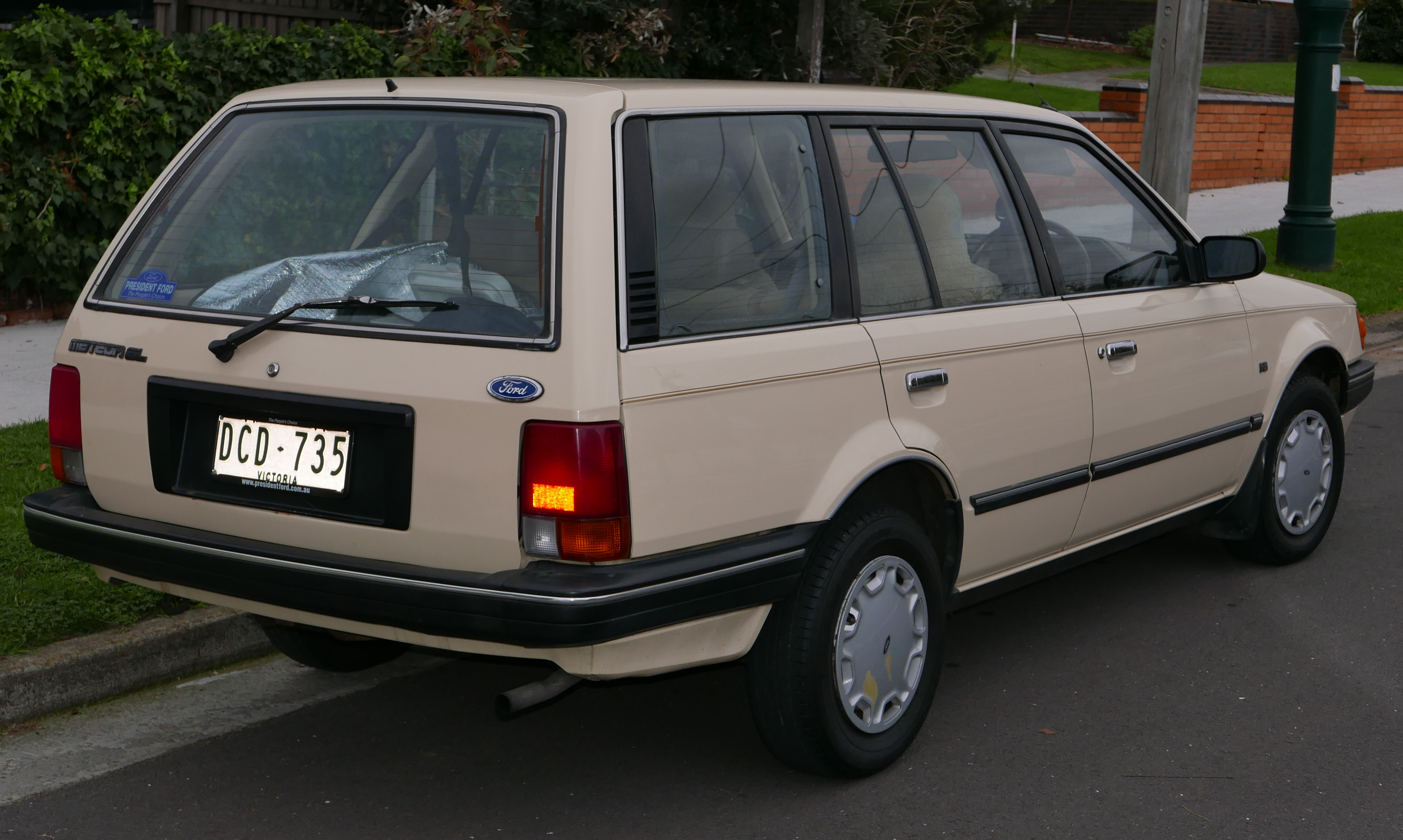
Ford Meteor (GC) GL wagon

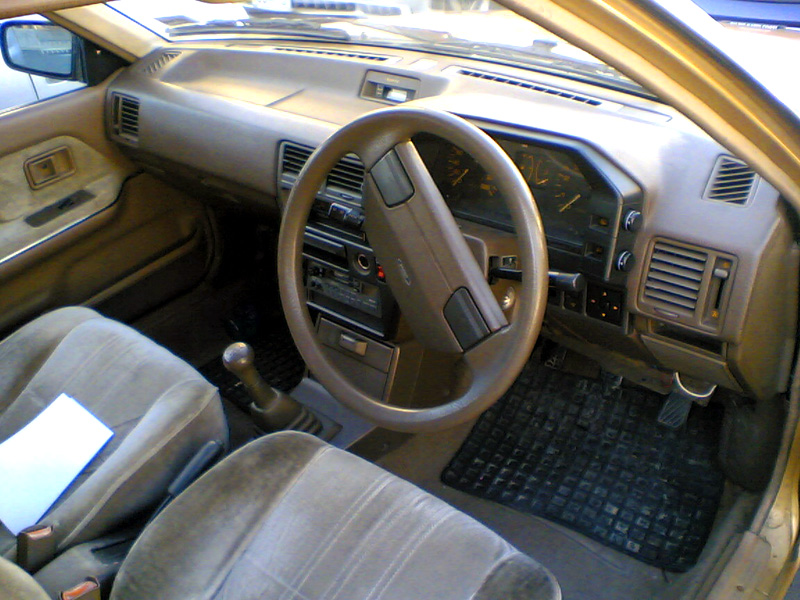
Interior

==== Laser (KE) ====
In October 1987, Ford introduced a facelift of the KC series, the KE. There were a number of notable changes with the introduction of the KE. The "Meteor" name was dropped from the sedan and wagon body styles, meaning they were now badged as "Laser", like the hatchback variants. The TX3 was also now available with a turbocharged engine and all-wheel-drive (AWD) as options. The TX3 Turbo with AWD is now very rare and highly sought after. The AWD was fully imported from Japan, while all other models in the Laser range were manufactured locally in the Sydney suburb of Flemington.

The KE is easy to distinguish from the earlier KC, by different grilles, headlights, tail lights, body-side mouldings, bonnet, front guards, and on some models, wheels. The dashboard and instrument cluster received new graphics, and the interior was available in slightly different colour shades to the KC. In mid-1989, in preparation for a new Australian Design Rules (ADRs) to come into effect in 1990, all models were fitted with a high-mount rear stop lamp as standard. When the redesigned KF Laser was introduced in March 1990, the wagon continued in a sole GL specification, with minor upgrades until September 1994, when Australian production of the Laser ceased.

The "L" is quite rare, as it was primarily aimed at the budget or fleet buyer and available as a five-door hatchback and station wagon. It had silver-painted 13-inch steel wheels, with no centre caps, a large analogue clock in the instrument cluster, no passenger-side rear-view mirror, vinyl interior trim, no body side mouldings, no rear windscreen wiper, and the folding rear seat was only one-piece. The stereo was also AM-only and had no cassette player. Air conditioning was not available. The only engine on offer was the 1.3-litre engine, with four-speed manual transmission (no automatic was available). The "L" wagon had the same level of trim, except the 1.3-litre engine was replaced with the 1.6-litre unit, but still with four-speed transmission (automatic was not available on either the hatchback or wagon).

The "GL" was the most popular model. It featured the same silver-painted 13" steel wheels as the "L" but with satin chrome half-width centre caps (only covering the centre of the wheel), a digital clock on the top of the dashboard, cloth interior trim, grey body side mouldings, a rear windscreen wiper, grey tailgate and beaver panel garnishes and 50/50 split-fold rear seat. The stereo was an analogue-tuned AM/FM unit with a basic cassette player. Air conditioning was optional as a dealer-fit accessory. Power was provided by a 1.6-litre engine, with 4-speed manual transmission (5-speed manual or 3-speed automatic was optional). Sedan and wagon came standard with five-speed transmission.

The Ghia was the luxury model. It had black 14-inch steel wheels with full-size plastic wheel covers, power steering, body-coloured rear-view mirrors and bumpers, velour interior trim, tachometer, centre console with Ghia emblem, lockable glovebox, driver's seat with lumbar support and height adjust, storage drawer underneath the front passenger seat, full-size interior door trims, vanity mirror in passenger sun visor, ticket holder in driver's sun visor, felt interior headlining and sunvisors, rear headrests, additional warning lights in the instrument cluster, central locking with illuminated driver's door lock barrel, remote exterior mirrors, front door map pockets, front seatback pockets, additional reading lamps, chrome insert strips in the body side mouldings and bumpers, red tailgate garnish and orange beaver panel garnish. Air conditioning and power windows were optional. The stereo was a digitally tuned AM/FM unit, which featured a cassette player with Dolby enhanced sound. The 1.6-litre engine was fitted as standard, with EFI optional (standard on wagon), with either 5-speed manual or 3-speed automatic transmission (EFI automatic was 4-speed).

The TX3 was the Laser flagship. It came standard with 14-inch satin-chrome alloy wheels, sports cloth interior trim, red insert strips in the body side mouldings and bumpers, black tailgate and beaver panel garnishes, semi-bucket seats with adjustable seat height, back and lumbar support, auto fade interior lamps, and all other Ghia appointings. EFI and A/C was standard, and automatic transmission was not available. The TX3 also had a unique front fascia with quad headlights and the parker lamps incorporated into the indicator lenses (L/GL/Ghia had the parkers inside the main headlight unit) and two-tone paint.

Halfway through KE production, Ford introduced two limited edition versions, called "Redline", and "Livewire". The Redline was based on the GL hatch, while the Livewire was based on the GL sedan and hatch. The Redline featured the TX3's alloy wheels, two-tone paint and red inserts in the body-side mouldings and bumpers, air conditioning, and a tachometer. The Livewire featured yellow inserts in the body side mouldings and bumpers, a body coloured grille, air conditioning, and a tachometer. Both models had 5-speed manual transmission (as opposed to the standard 4-speed) as standard, with 3-speed automatic transmission as an option.

KE model range;

- Laser L – Hatch or wagon
- Laser GL – Hatch, sedan or wagon
- Laser Ghia – Hatch, sedan or wagon
- Laser TX3
- Laser TX3 Turbo
- Laser TX3 Turbo 4WD
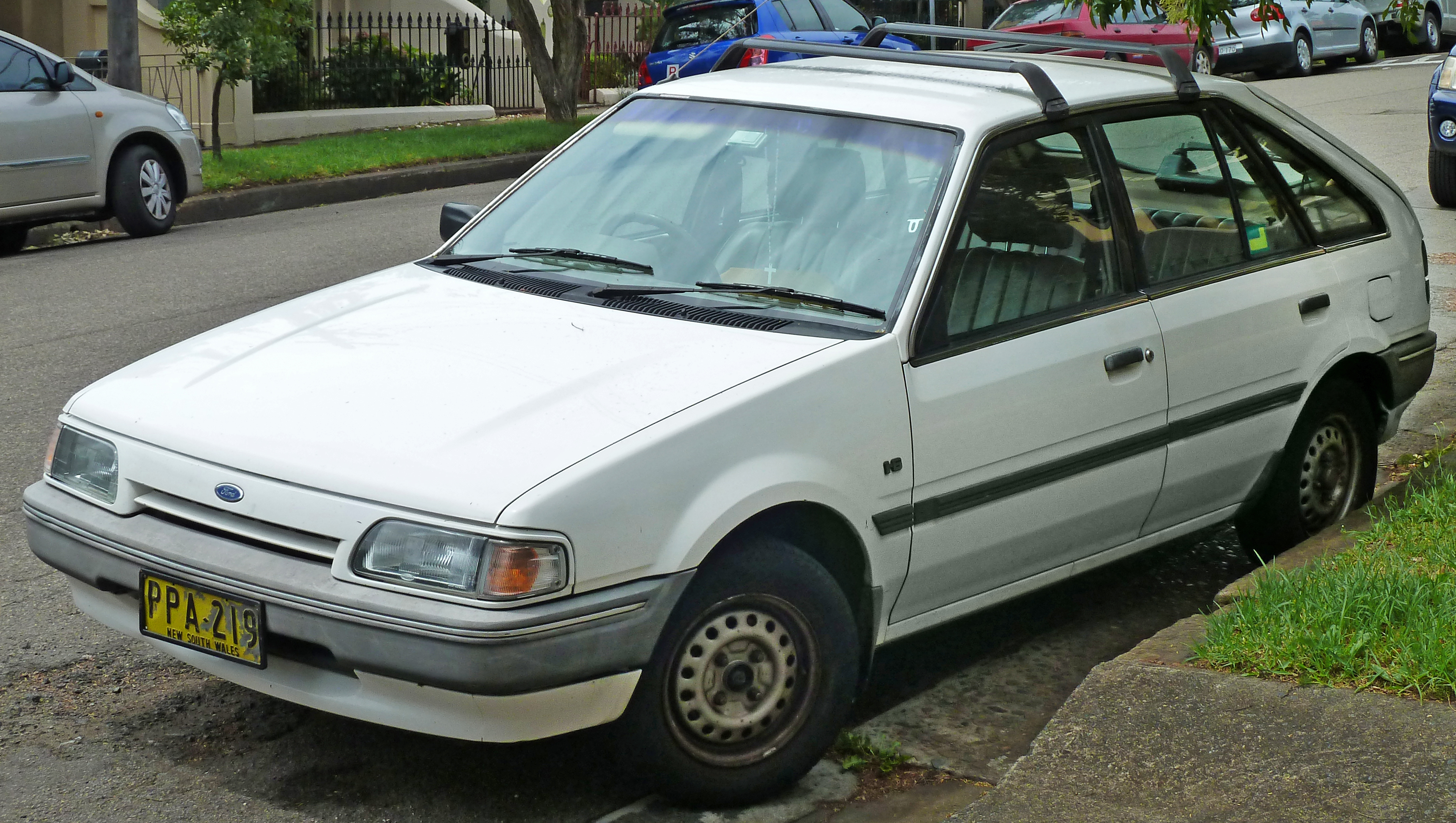
Ford Laser (KE) L 5-door

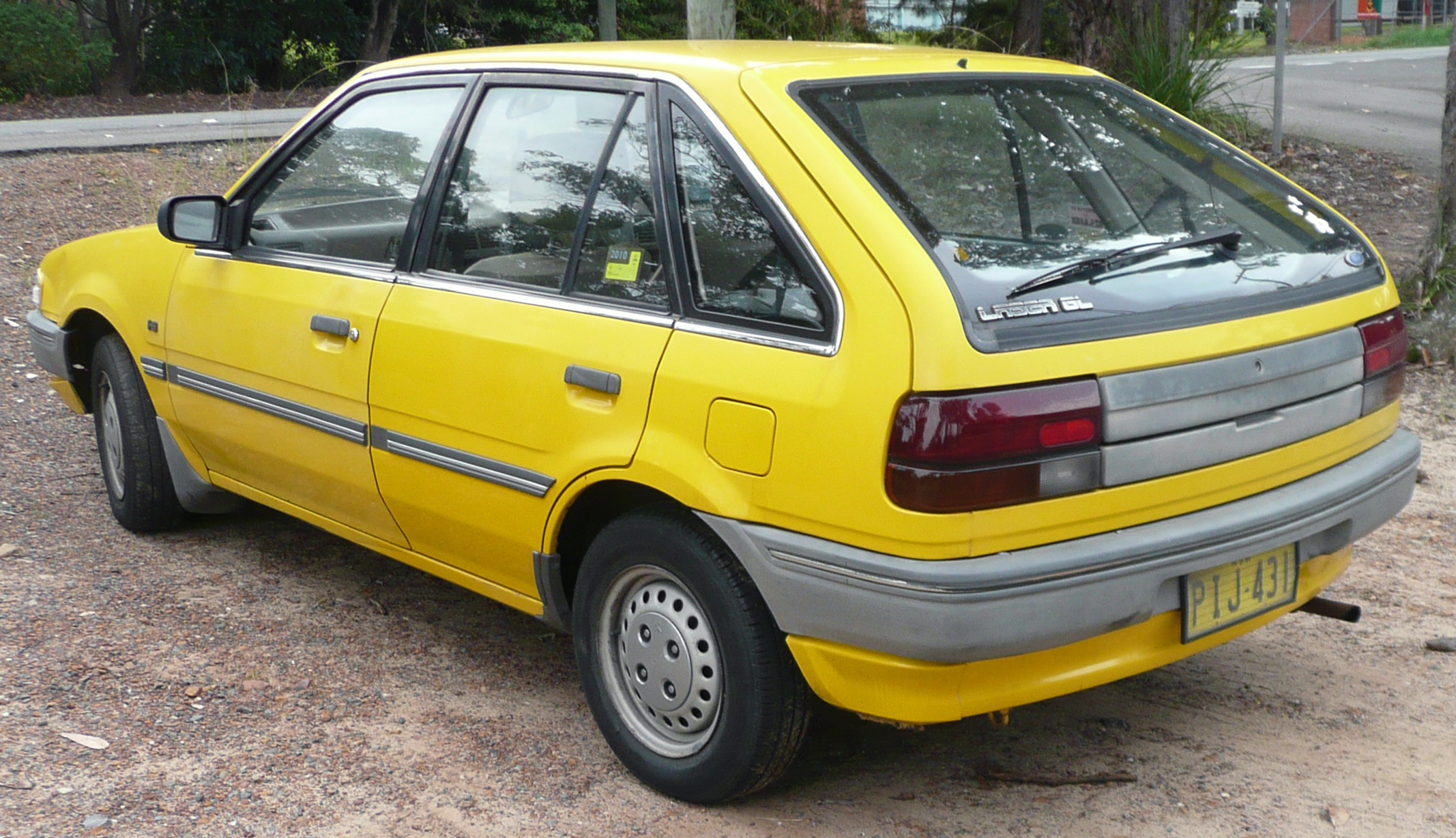
Ford Laser (KE) GL 5-door

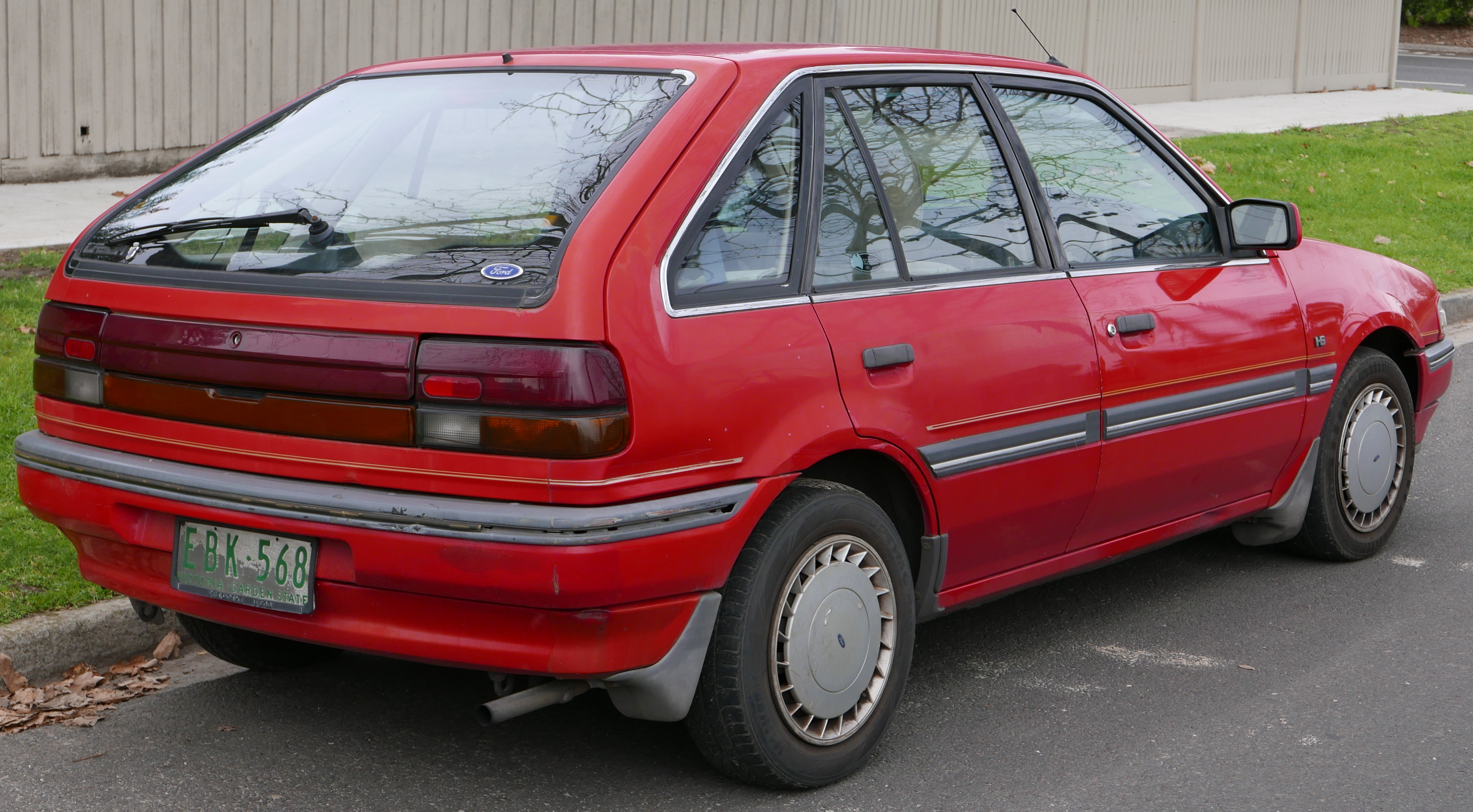
Ford Laser (KE) Ghia 5-door

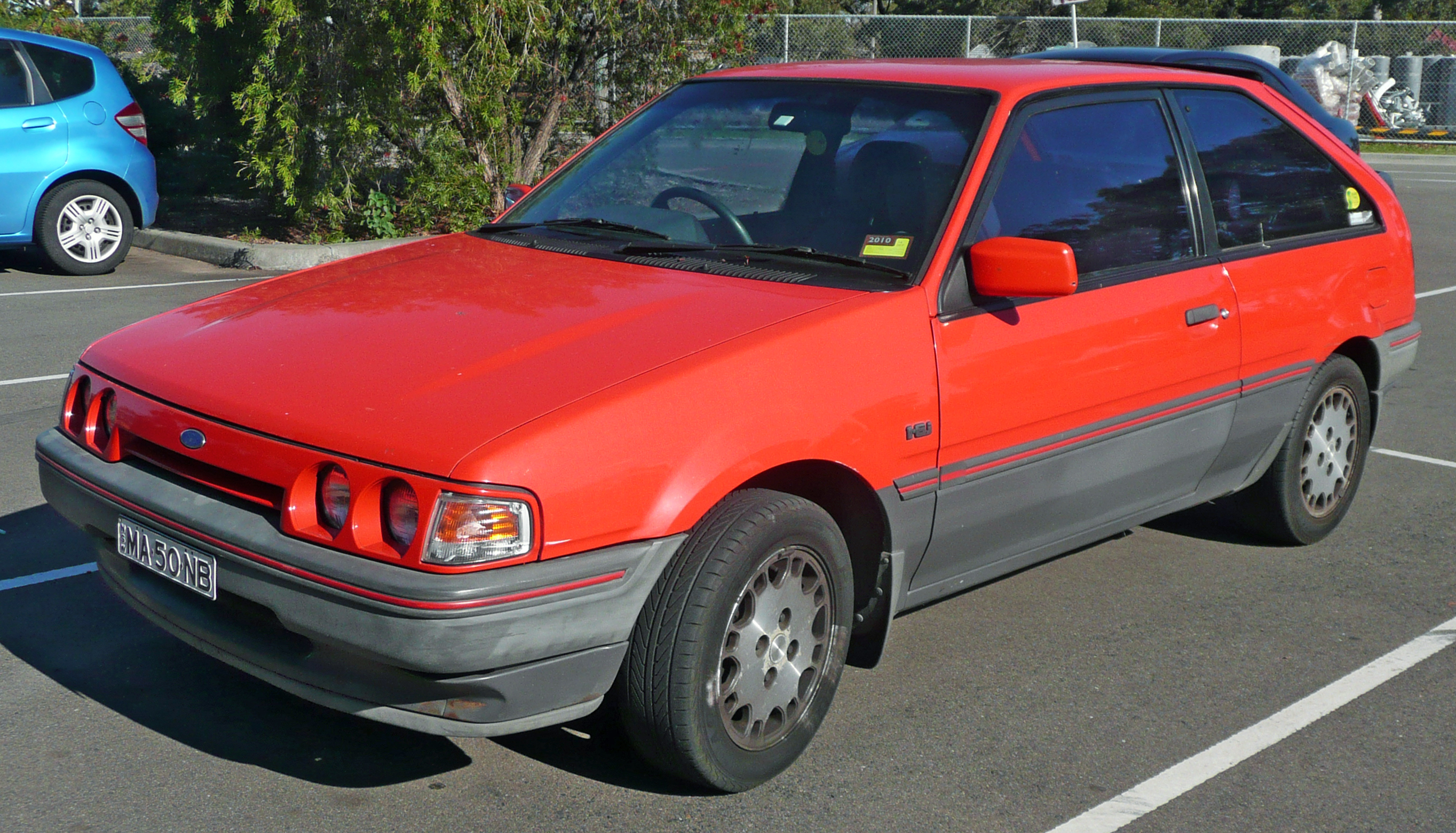
Ford Laser (KE) TX3 3-door

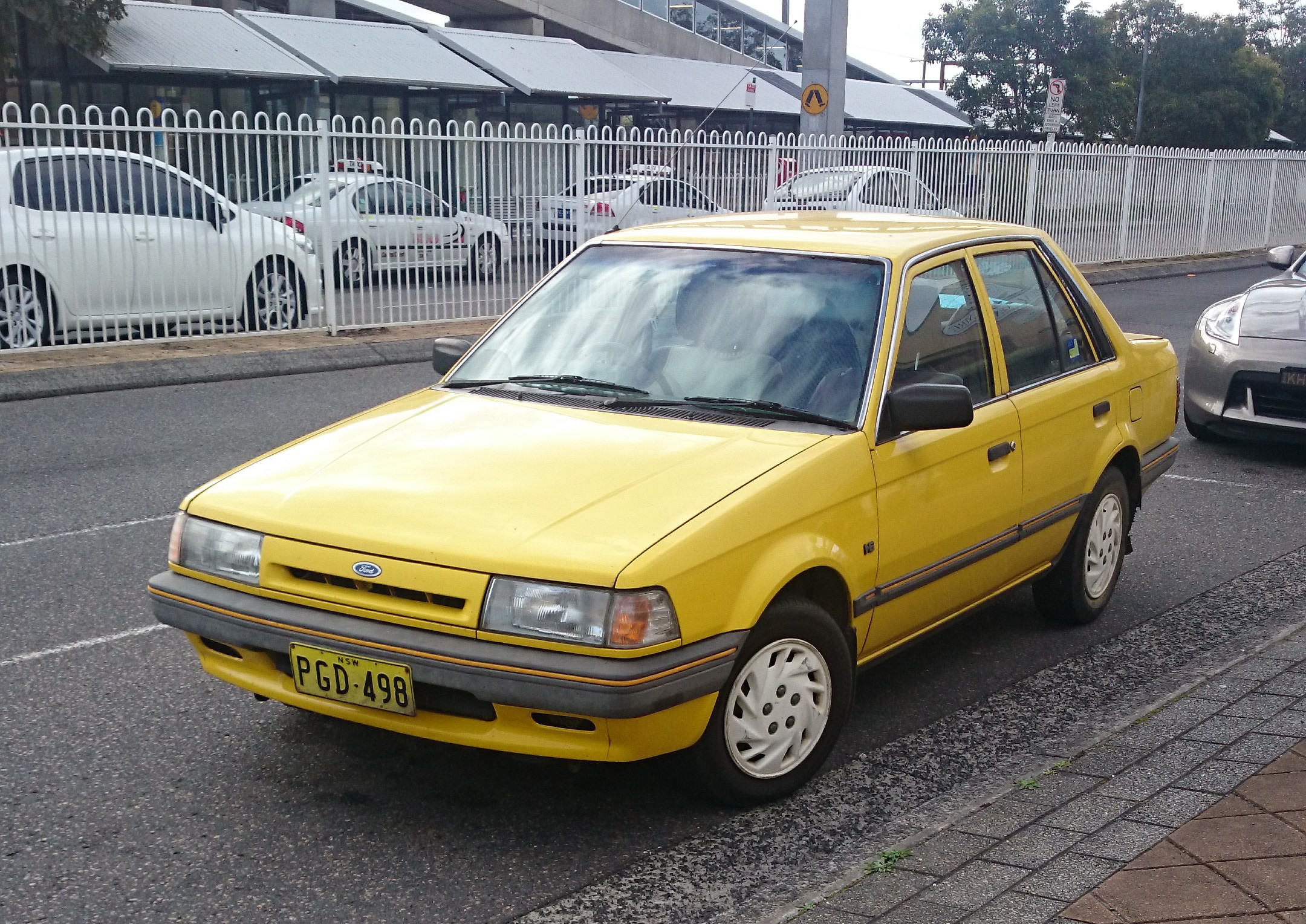
Ford Laser (KE) GL Livewire sedan

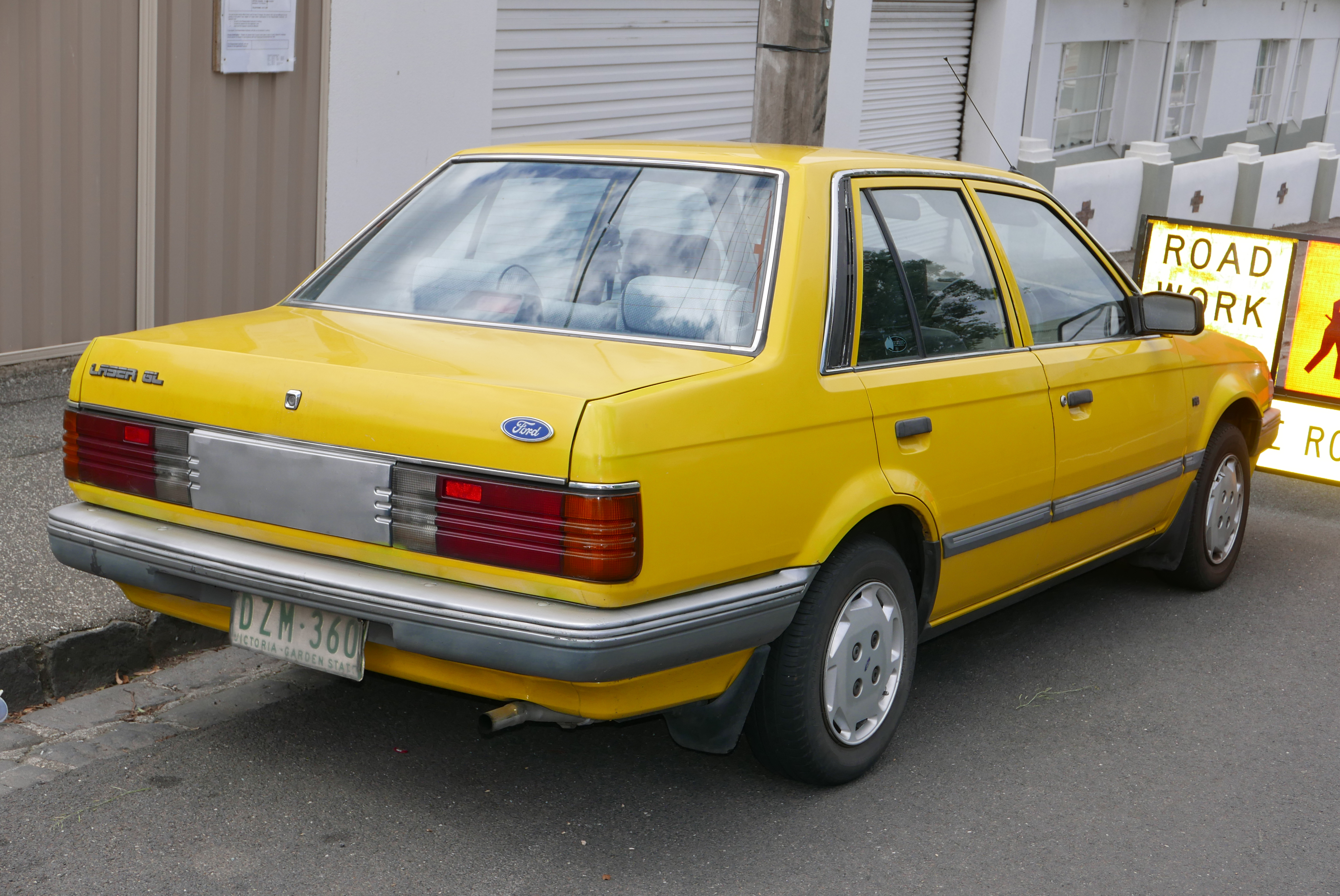
Ford Laser (KE) GL sedan

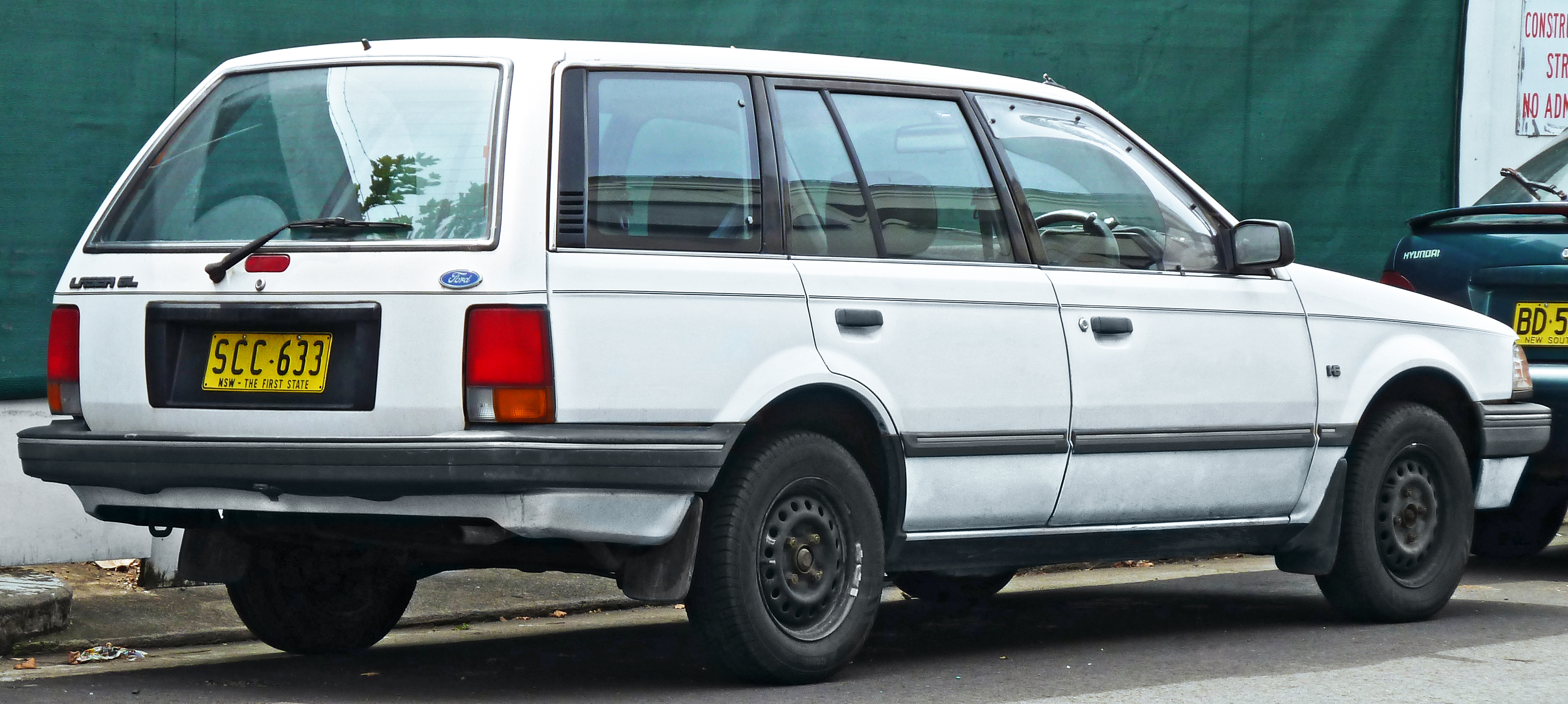
1989–1990 Ford Laser (KE) GL wagon

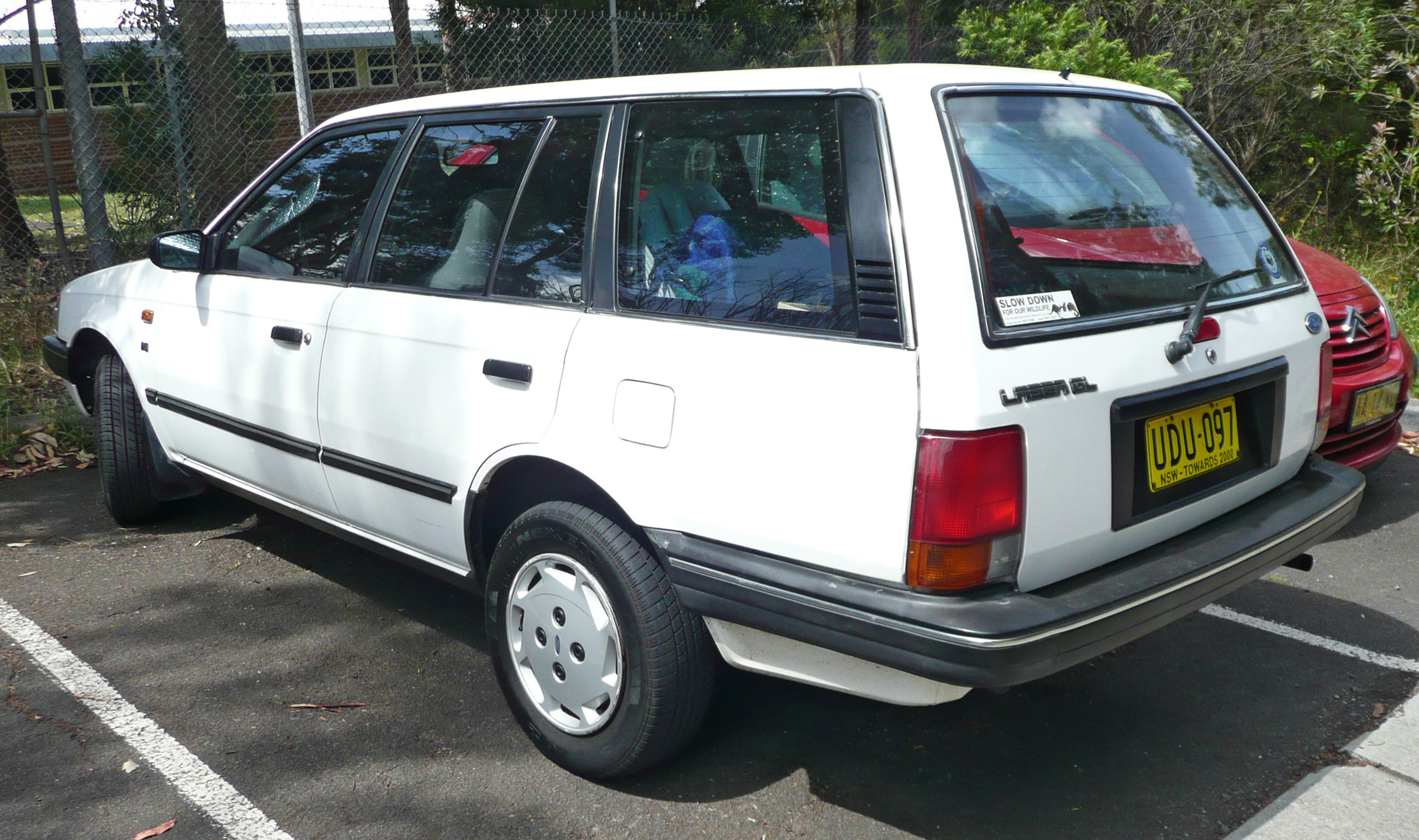
1991–1994 Ford Laser (KE II) GL wagon

=== Asia ===
The Laser was also sold in Thailand, Malaysia, Singapore, Hong Kong, Taiwan, Sri Lanka, and other markets. Trim and specifications vary somewhat between the countries. In Indonesia, this Laser was assembled at Mazda's plant in Bekasi together with its Mazda 323 twin. It was available in GL and Ghia trims from late 1985 with the 1.3-litre E3 engine (68 PS (50 kW)) or 1.5-litre E5 engine (75 PS (55 kW)), a five-speed manual transmission, and five-door hatchback or four-door saloon bodywork. Later, a non-emissions scrubbed Laser TX-3 three-door hatchback with the fuel injected B6 1.6-litre engine became available. This produced a claimed 104 PS (76 kW) at 6000 rpm. The production for general buyers was stopped in 1989, but the GL sedan with 1.3-litre E3 engine was continued to available for taxi fleet until 1997.

In Taiwan, the second generation Laser was assembled by Ford Lio Ho Motor. Unique for this market, it was offered with slightly different exterior styling. The pre-facelift hatchback (only available as five-door) was offered with different headlights (similar styling to KA Laser) and the facelift model received KE TX3 headlights. Second facelift occurred for sedan and wagon, with massive makeover borrowed from the Mazda 323 (BF) facelift styling. A performance five-door hatchback TX3 Turbo was also available in Taiwan with a 130 PS (96 kW) 1.6-liter DOHC turbo engine.

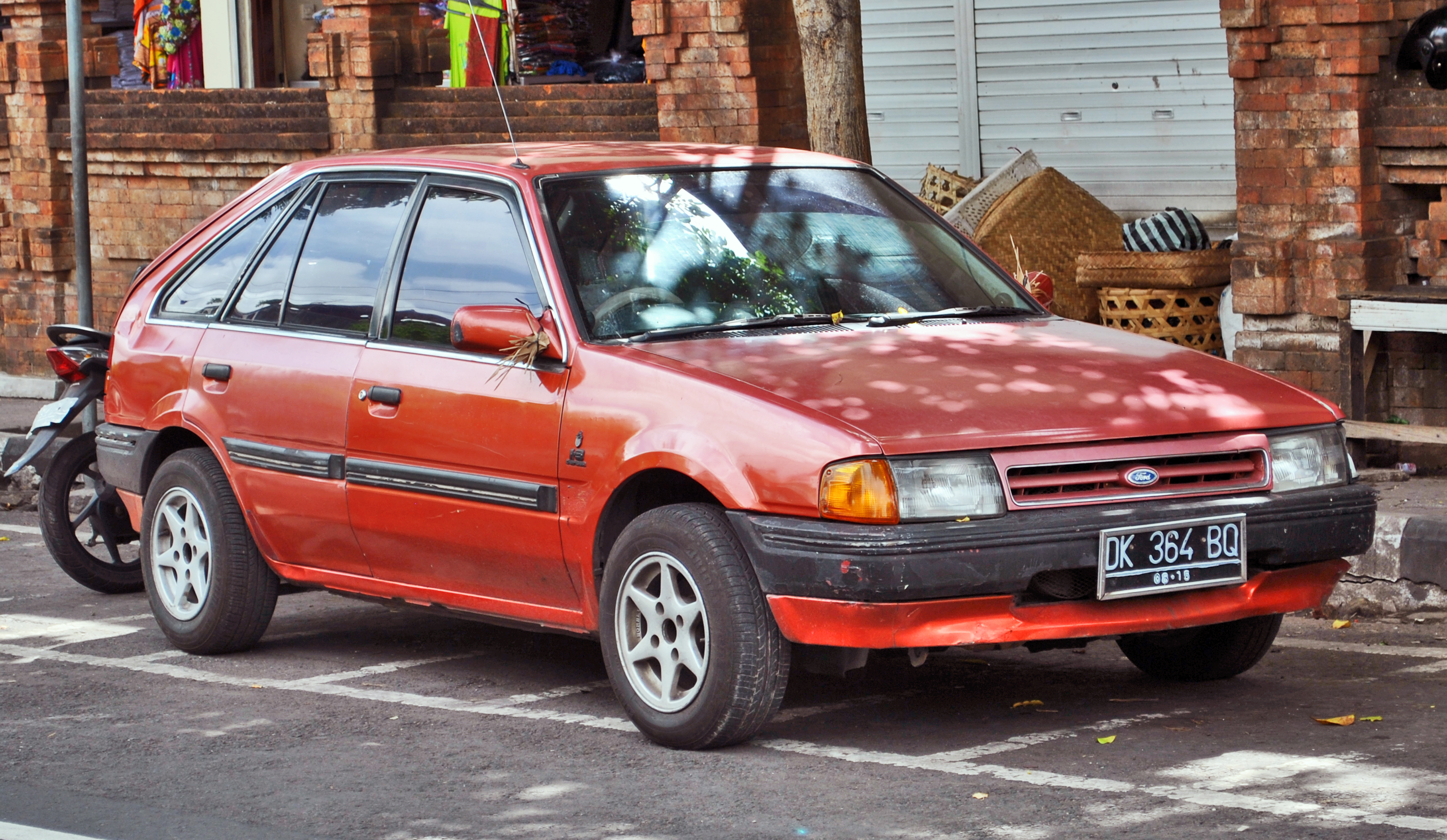
Ford Laser 1.3 5-door hatchback (pre-facelift; Indonesia)

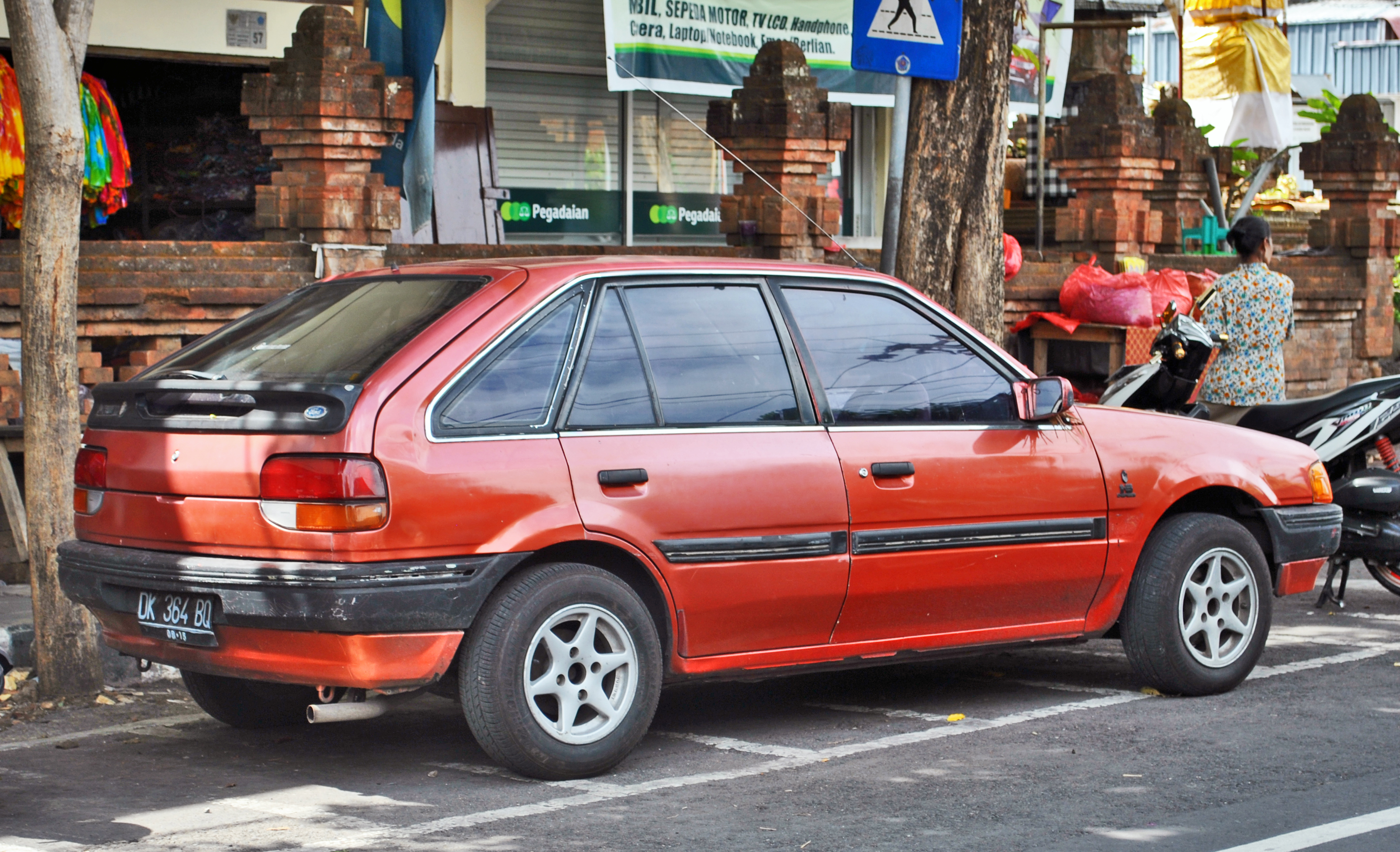
Ford Laser 1.3 5-door hatchback (pre-facelift; Indonesia)

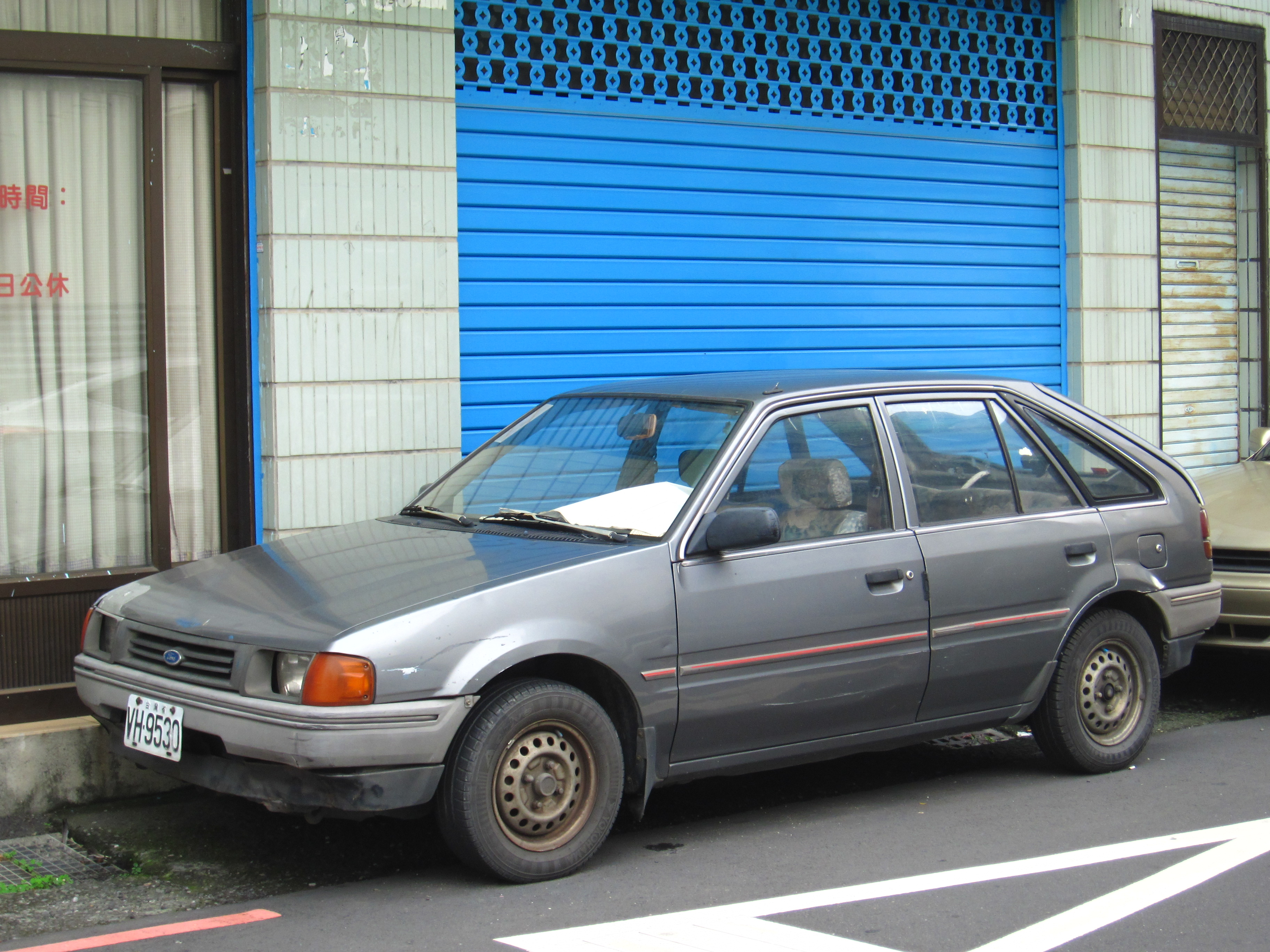
Ford Laser TX3 5-door hatchback (pre-facelift; Taiwan)

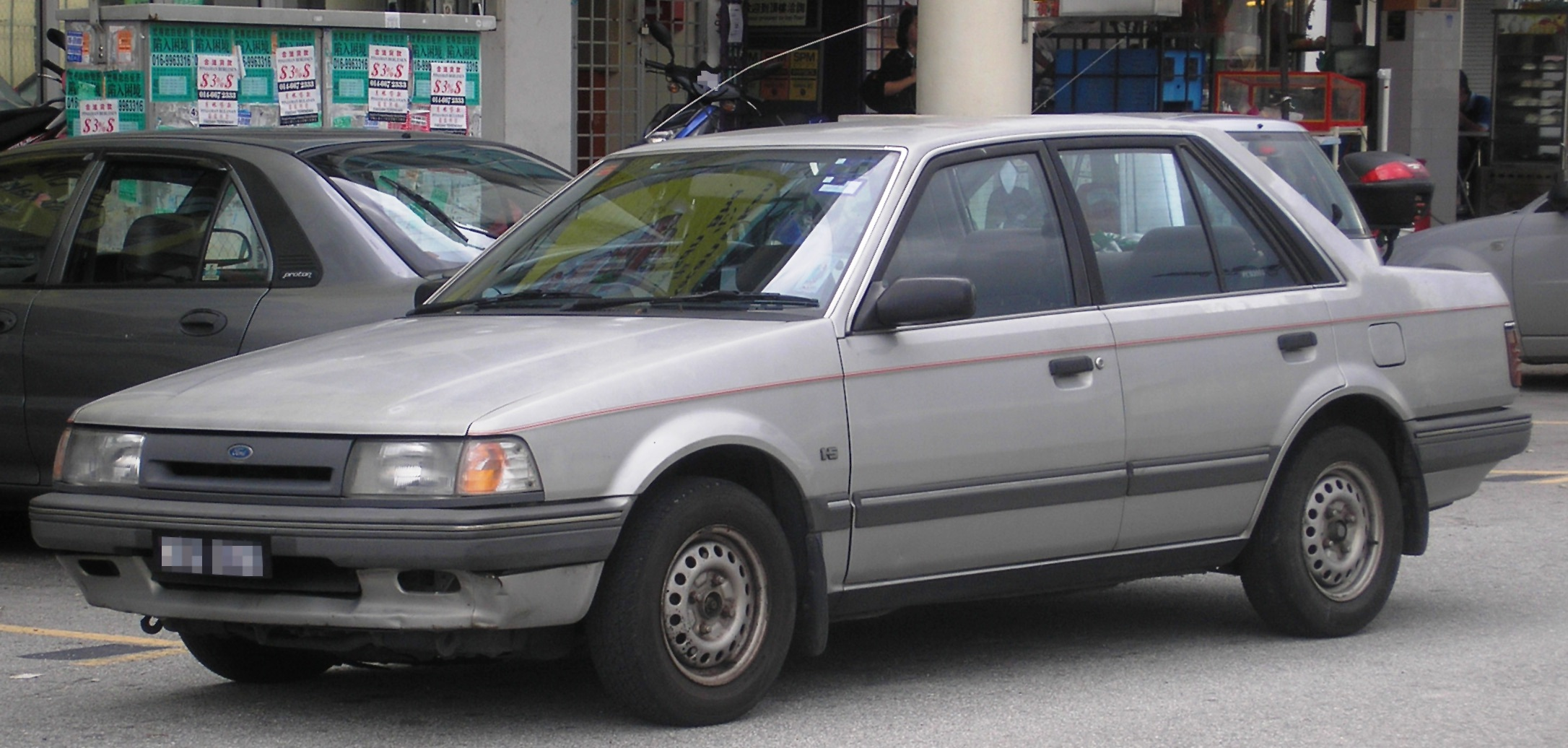
Ford Laser sedan (facelift; Malaysia)

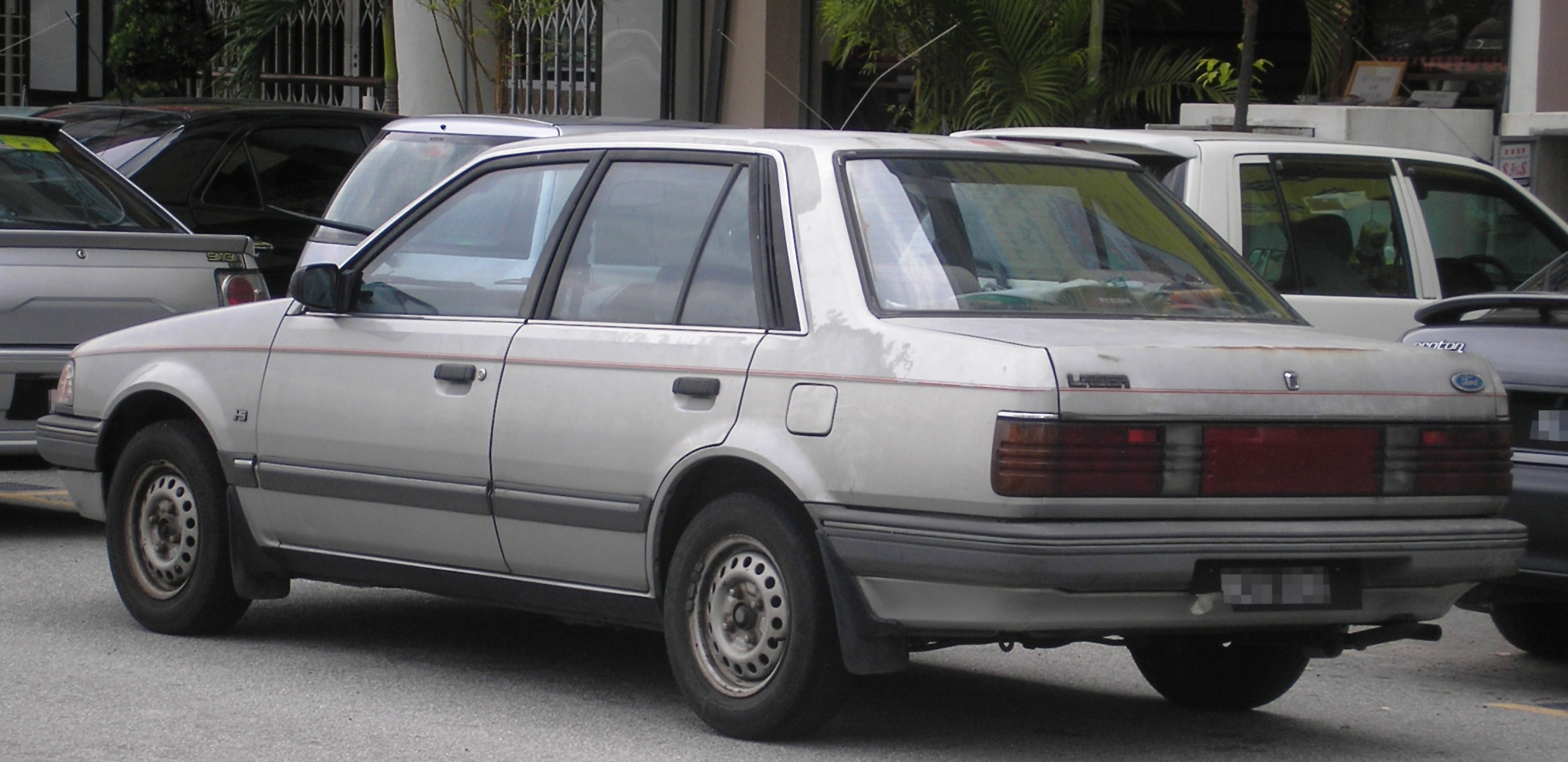
Ford Laser sedan (facelift; Malaysia)

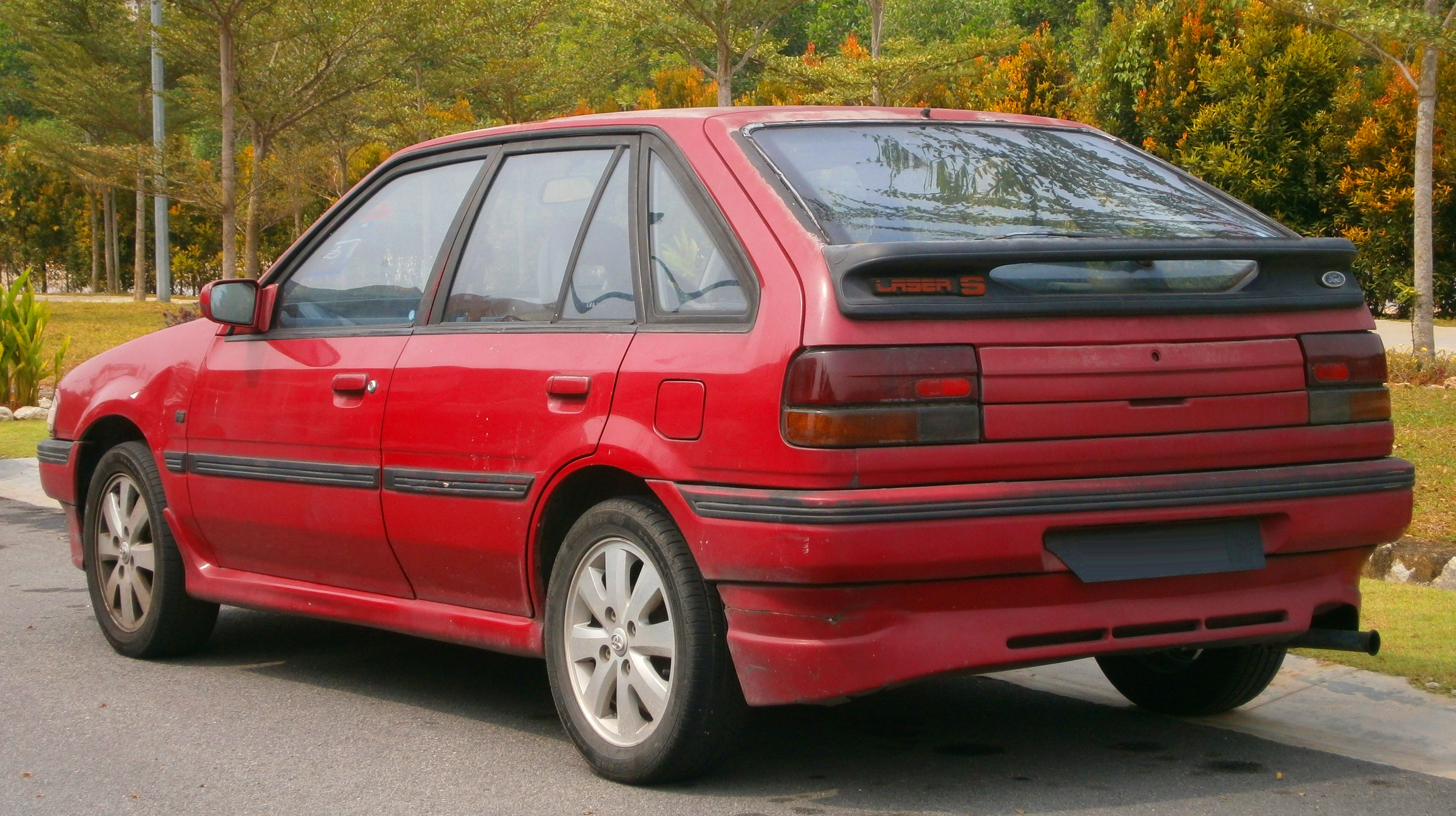
Ford Laser S 5-door hatchback (facelift; Malaysia)

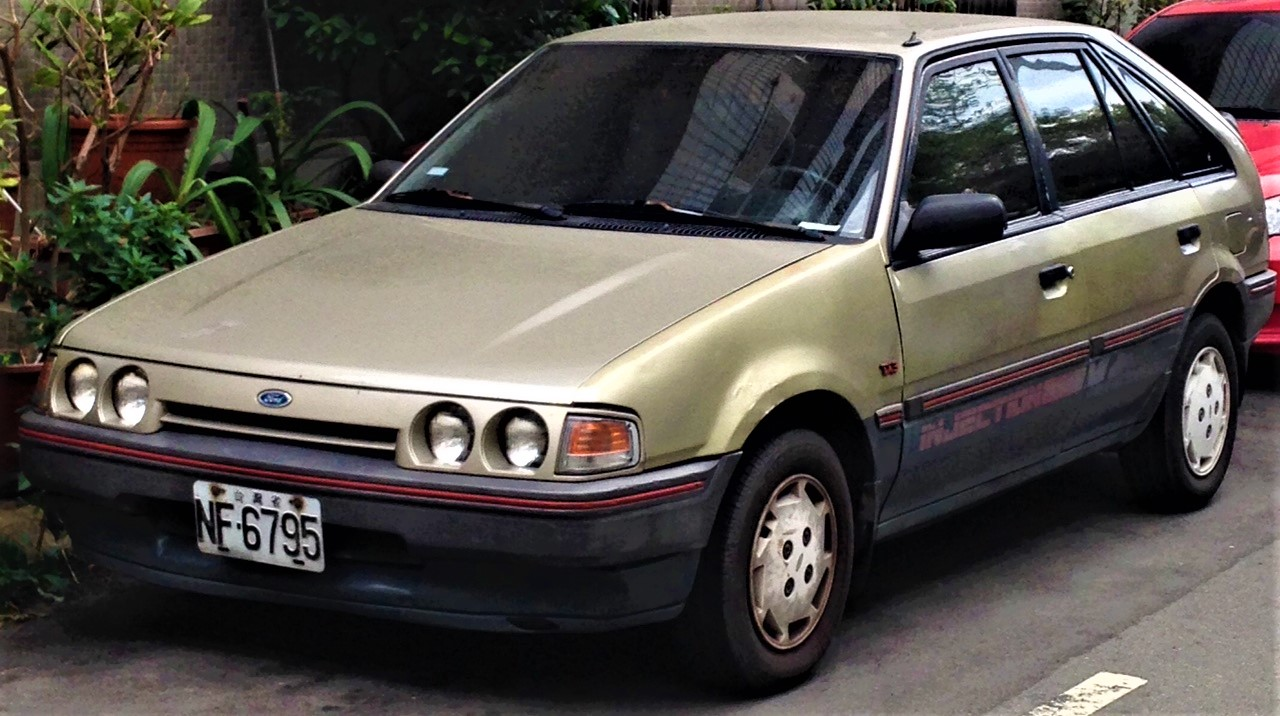
Ford Laser TX3 5-door hatchback (facelift; Taiwan)

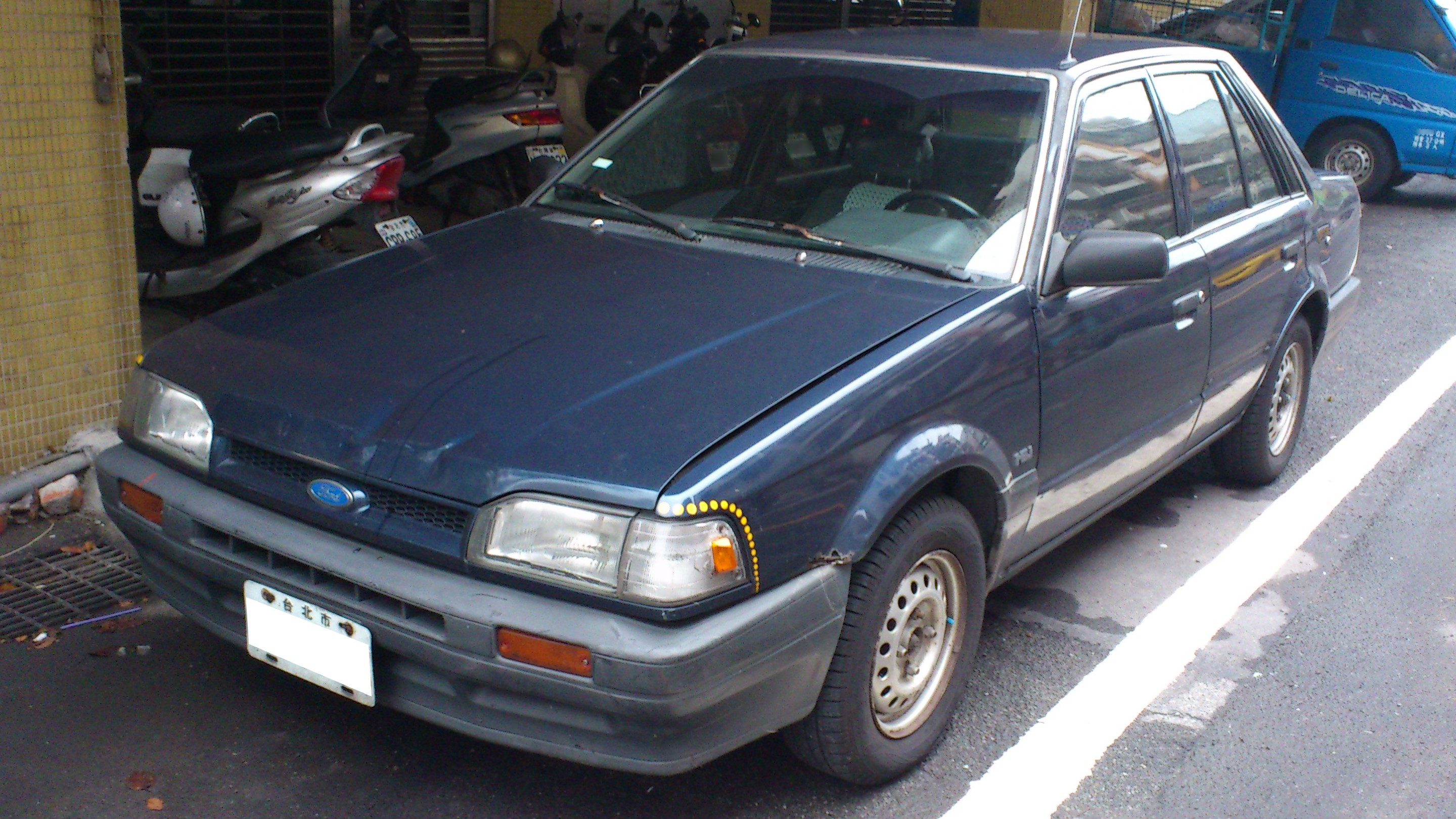
Ford Laser Nobel 1.6J sedan (second facelift; Taiwan)

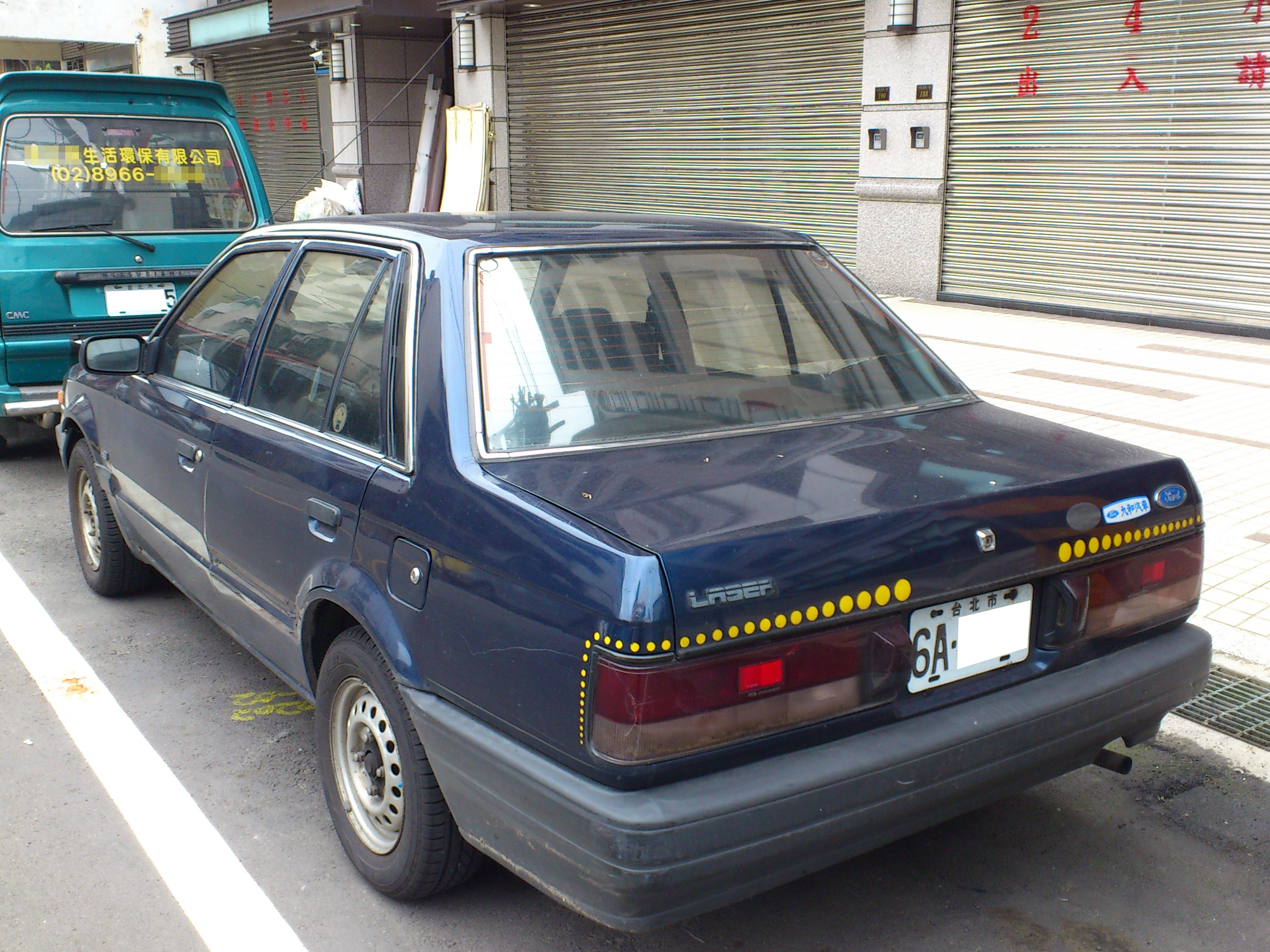
Ford Laser Nobel 1.6J sedan (second facelift; Taiwan)

=== North America ===
A version of the KC Laser, the Mercury Tracer, was marketed in the US and Canada, available as a hatchback and wagon only. The Tracer hatchback shared its bodyshell with its Laser counterpart, but the wagon was a distinct design based on the Laser hatchback, rather than the sedan, as was the case with the Meteor wagon. US versions of the Tracer were built in Mexico at Ford's Hermosillo Stamping and Assembly plant, whereas for the Canadian market, Ford opted to import the Mercury Tracer from Taiwan's Ford Lio Ho Motor instead. In Bermuda, however, the KE Laser was sold locally in right hand drive badged as a Ford.

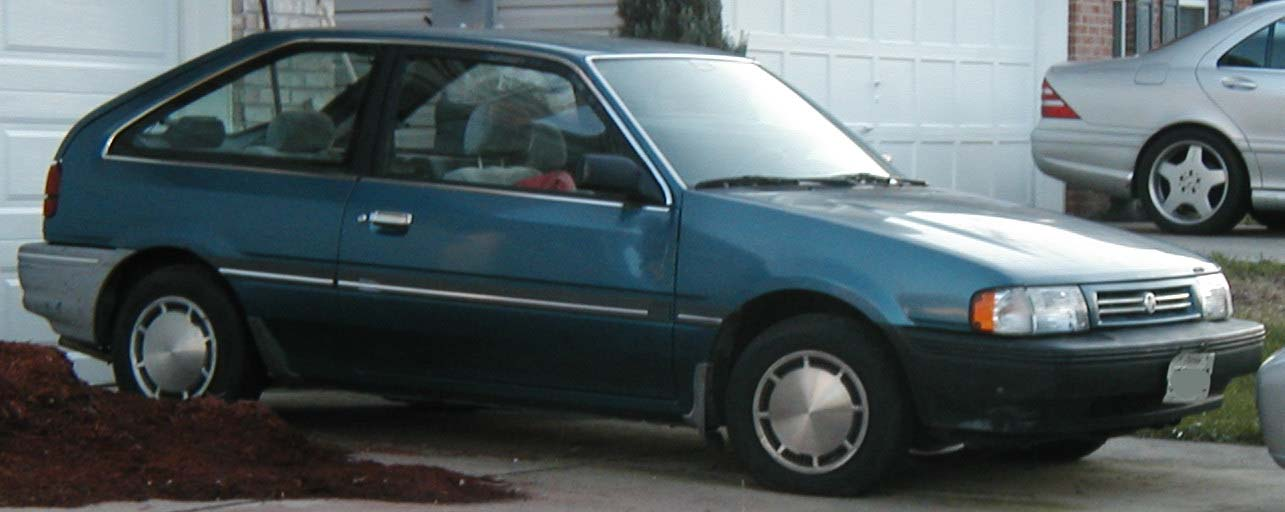
Mercury Tracer 3-door hatchback

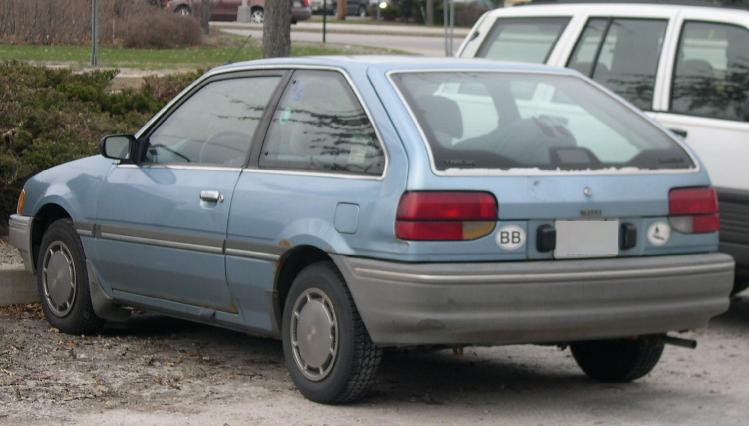
Mercury Tracer 3-door hatchback

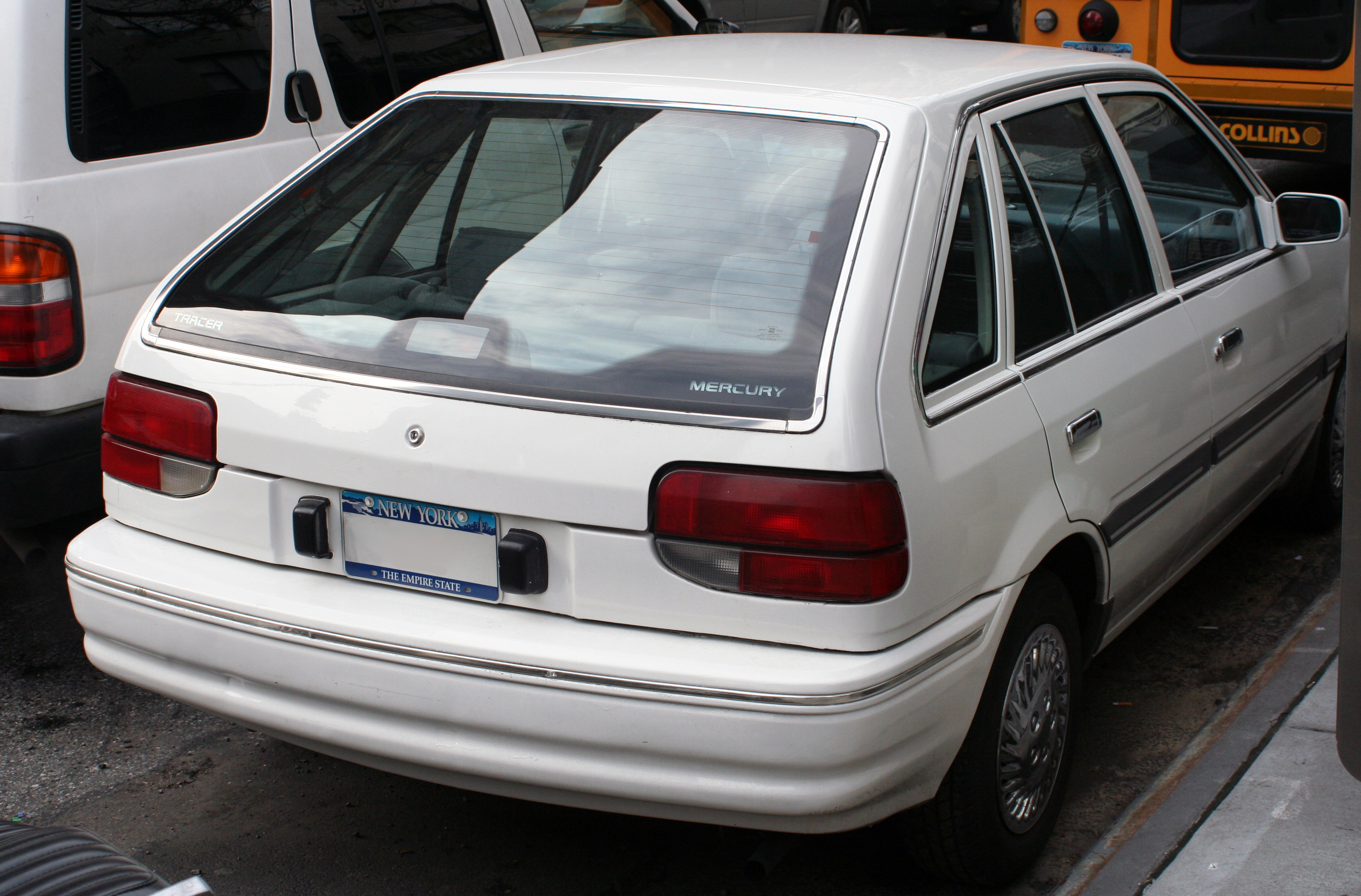
Mercury Tracer 5-door hatchback

=== South Africa ===
The Laser was introduced in South Africa in 1986, as a hatchback, with the sedan version being sold as the Meteor. Replacing the Ford Escort, it was produced alongside the Mazda 323 by Samcor. Originally the Laser and Meteor were available with Mazda E-series 1.3-litre carb and 1.5-litre carb engines and also a high compression 1.6-litre B6 EFi engine for the 1600i Sport model. From 1989, Ford's CVH engines (1.4 and 1.6) were used, replacing the earlier E engines. These were later in turn replaced by Mazda's B3 1.3-litre and F6 1.6-litre engines. South African models of the Laser and Meteor also gained the 2.0-litre FE SOHC 8-valve and FE-DOHC EFi 16-valve engine from 1991 to 1993, the later was available for the flagship 20i RS. The KC/KE Laser and Meteor remained in production in South Africa until 1995, when the Escort was reintroduced.

However, Ford introduced an entry-level model called the Tonic and Tracer, a rebadged version of the locally manufactured BF series Mazda 323 hatchback, which was sold until 2003. There was also a coupe utility version with facelifted Mazda 323 BF styling, sold as Ford Bantam and Mazda Rustler.

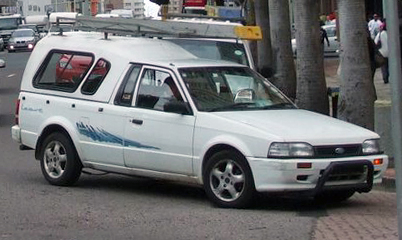
Ford Bantam coupe utility

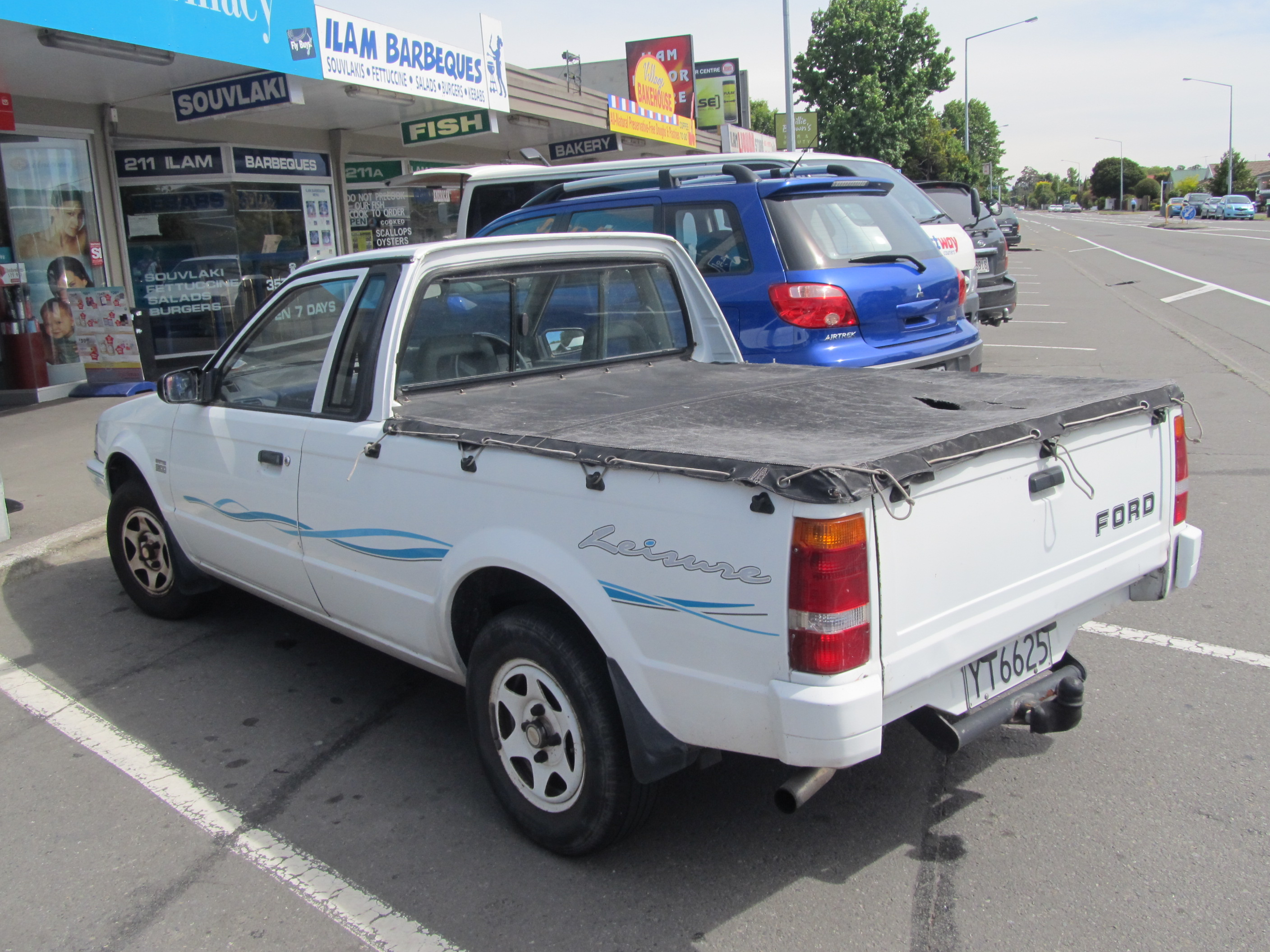
Ford Bantam coupe utility

=== Engine specifications ===
- Mazda E3
  - 68 PS (50 kW) & 95 N⋅m (70 lb⋅ft) 1296 cc Carb 8V SOHC (net)
  - 73 PS (54 kW) & 103 N⋅m (76 lb⋅ft) 1296 cc Carb 8V SOHC (gross)
- Mazda E5
  - 75 PS (55 kW) & 112 N⋅m (83 lb⋅ft) 1490 cc Carb 8V SOHC (net)
  - 85 PS (63 kW) & 121 N⋅m (89 lb⋅ft) 1490 cc Carb 8V SOHC (gross)
- Mazda E5F
  - 95 PS (70 kW) & 124 N⋅m (91 lb⋅ft) 1490 cc EFI 8V SOHC (gross, 'TX3' Japanese models)
- Mazda E5T
  - 100 PS (74 kW) & 149 N⋅m (110 lb⋅ft) 1490 cc EFI 8V SOHC Turbo ('Cabriolet' and 'TX3 Turbo' Japanese models)
- Mazda B3
  - 68 PS (50 kW) & 101 N⋅m (74 lb⋅ft) 1323 cc Carb 8V SOHC
- Mazda B5
  - 76 PS (56 kW) & 112 N⋅m (83 lb⋅ft) 1498 cc Carb 8V SOHC (Japanese models)
- Mazda B6
  - 72 PS (53 kW) & 121 N⋅m (89 lb⋅ft) 1597 cc Carb 8V SOHC
  - 84 PS (62 kW) & 123 N⋅m (91 lb⋅ft) 1597 cc EFI 8V SOHC (option on 'GHIA' models and standard on 'TX3' Australian models, 'Ghia sedan' and 'TX3' Japanese models, 'Meteor GLi' South African models)
  - 105 PS (77 kW) & 132 N⋅m (97 lb⋅ft) 1597 cc EFI 8V SOHC (10.5 compression ratio, '1600i Sport' South African models)
  - 104 PS (76 kW) & 132 N⋅m (97 lb⋅ft) 1597 cc EFI 16V SOHC (9.5 compression ratio, 'TX3 1.6i' Indonesian models)
- Mazda B6D
  - 110 PS (81 kW) & 132 N⋅m (97 lb⋅ft) 1597 cc EFI 16V DOHC ('S' and 'Cabriolet' Japanese models)
- Mazda B6T
  - 140 PS (103 kW) & 184 N⋅m (136 lb⋅ft) 1597 EFI 16V DOHC Turbo ('TX3 Turbo', 'Turbo 4WD' and 'GL' Japanese models)
  - 130 PS (96 kW) 1597 EFI 16V DOHC Turbo ('TX3 Turbo' Taiwanese models)
- Mazda F6
  - 81 PS (60 kW) & 120 N⋅m (89 lb⋅ft) 1587 cc Carb 8V SOHC (South African models)
- Mazda FE
  - 103 PS (76 kW) 1998 cc EFI 8V SOHC ('20 GLi' South African models)
  - 148 PS (109 kW) & 182 N⋅m (134 lb⋅ft) 1998 cc EFI 16V DOHC ('20i RS' South African models)
- Ford CVH 1.4
  - 73 PS (54 kW) 1392 cc Carb 8V SOHC (South African models)
- Ford CVH 1.6
  - 79 PS (58 kW) 1596 cc Carb 8V SOHC (South African models)
- Mazda PN diesel
  - 59 PS (43 kW) & 106 N⋅m (78 lb⋅ft) 1720 cc 8V SOHC (gross, 'GL' Japanese models)

== Third generation (KF/KH; 1989) ==
Third generation (KF/KH)
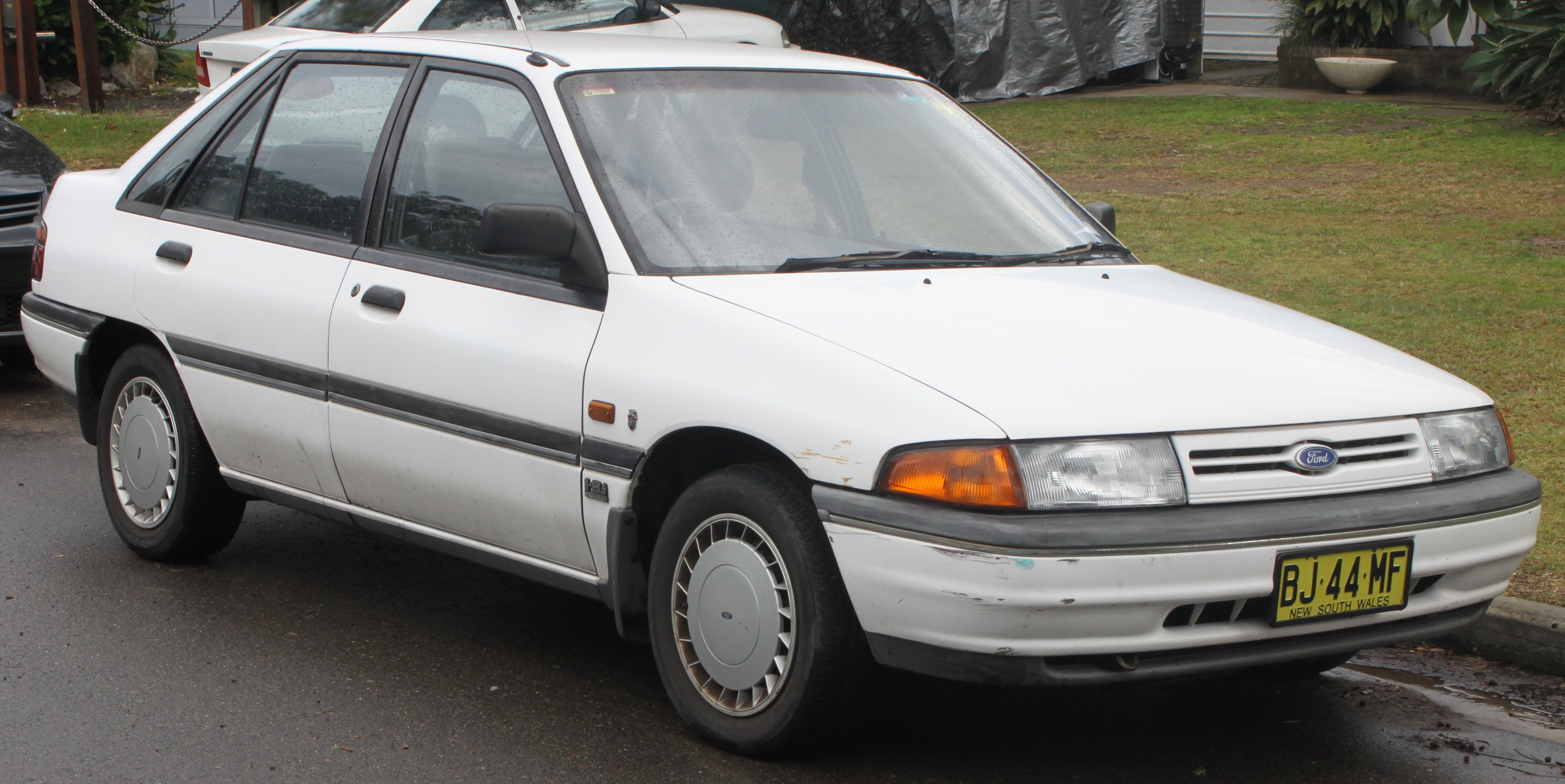
- Ford Laser (KF) Ghia hatchback

Overview
- Also called: Ford Escort (North America); Ford Golden Laser (Taiwan); Mercury Tracer (North America)
- Production: Japan: 1989–1994; Taiwan: 1990–1998; Australia: 1990–1994; New Zealand: 1990–1996; Indonesia: 1990–1997

Body and chassis
- Body style: 3-door hatchback 4-door sedan 5-door hatchback
- Related: Mazda Familia/323 (BG)

Powertrain
- Engine: Petrol: 1.3 L B3 I4; 1.5 L B5 I4; 1.6 L B6 I4; 1.8 L B8 I4; 1.8 L BP I4; 1.8 L BPT turbo I4; Diesel: 1.7 L PN I4
- Transmission: 5-speed manual 3/4-speed automatic

Dimensions
- Wheelbase: 2,500 mm (98 in)
- Length: 4,270 mm (168 in)
- Width: 1,695 mm (66.7 in)
- Height: 1,375–1,400 mm (54.1–55.1 in)
- Curb weight: 920–1,120 kg (2,030–2,470 lb)

The third generation BG series of 1989 to 1994 went on to be the most popular Laser sold in Japan, with the new "coupé" (liftback) version an instant success. Again, a DOHC turbo model with full-time 4WD was offered as a companion car to the Mazda Familia GT-X, now producing 180 PS (132 kW; 178 hp) from an increased displacement of 1.8 litres.

=== Australia ===
In Australia, this model was released in March 1990 as the KF series and updated in October 1991 with the KH facelift. Local production of the Laser in Australia ceased on 4 September 1994 when Ford closed its plant in Flemington and replaced it with the new KJ model, which was imported from Japan.

=== New Zealand ===
In New Zealand, the KH Laser continued in production at Ford's assembly plant in Wiri, Auckland, until the end of 1996 when the factory closed. The extended production model in New Zealand was sold only in five-door hatchback form as either the Laser Encore or Laser Esprit, as a cheaper alternative to the newer KJ Laser imported from Japan. The Encore was the cheaper of the two, available only with a five-speed manual transmission, while the Esprit was slightly higher specification and was available with both the five-speed and also a four-speed automatic. Both featured red pinstriping around the body and many received dealer-fit accessories such as alloy wheels to boost appeal.

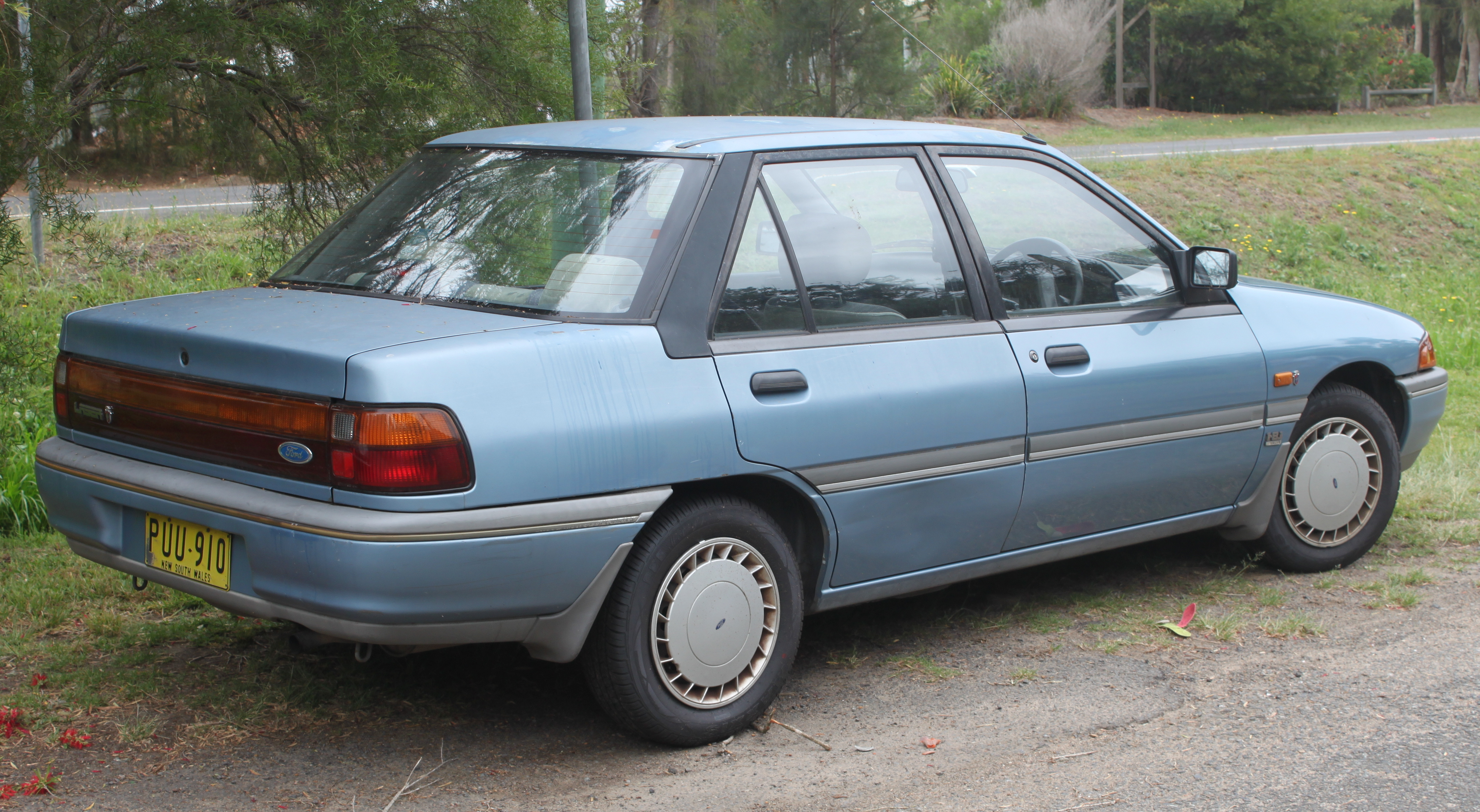
Ford Laser (KF) Ghia sedan (Australia)

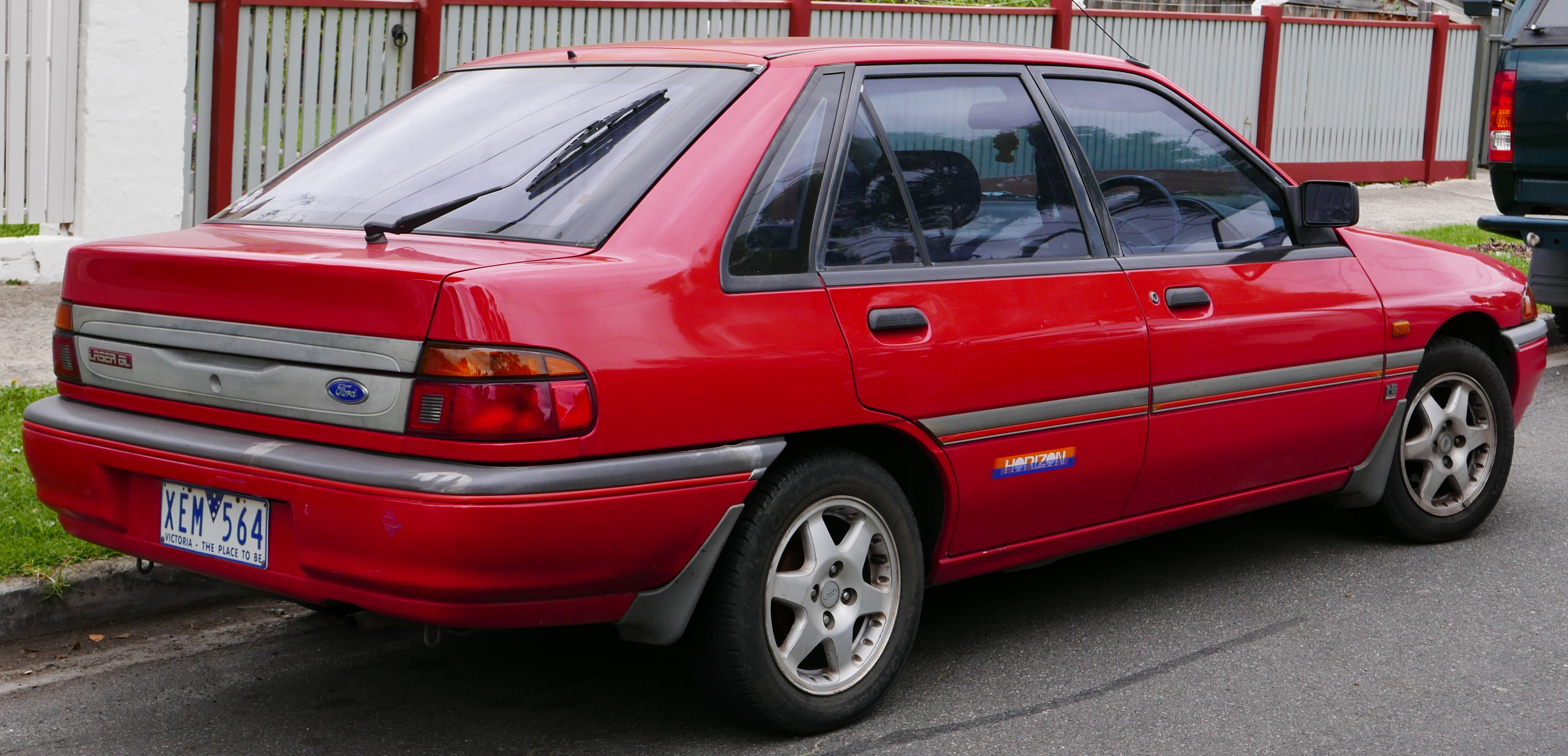
Ford Laser (KH) GL Horizon 5-door (Australia)

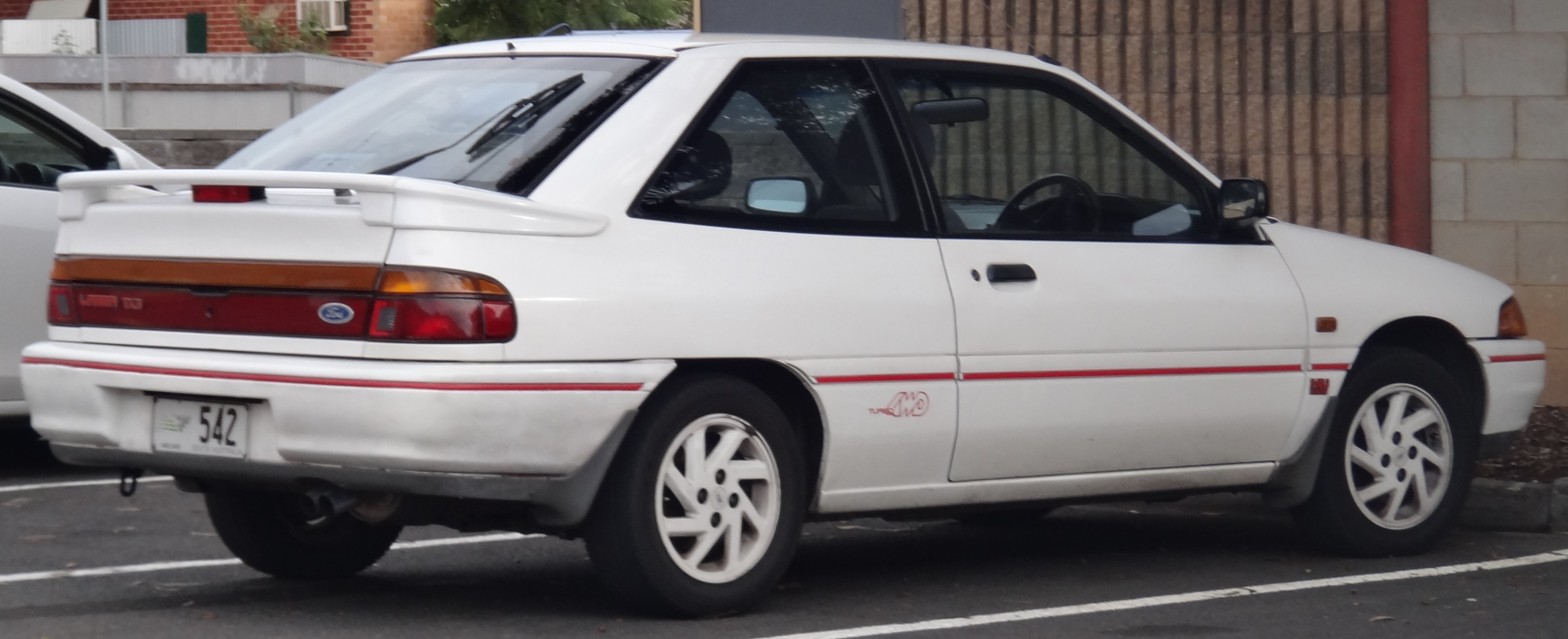
Ford Laser (KF) TX3 4WD 3-door (Australia)

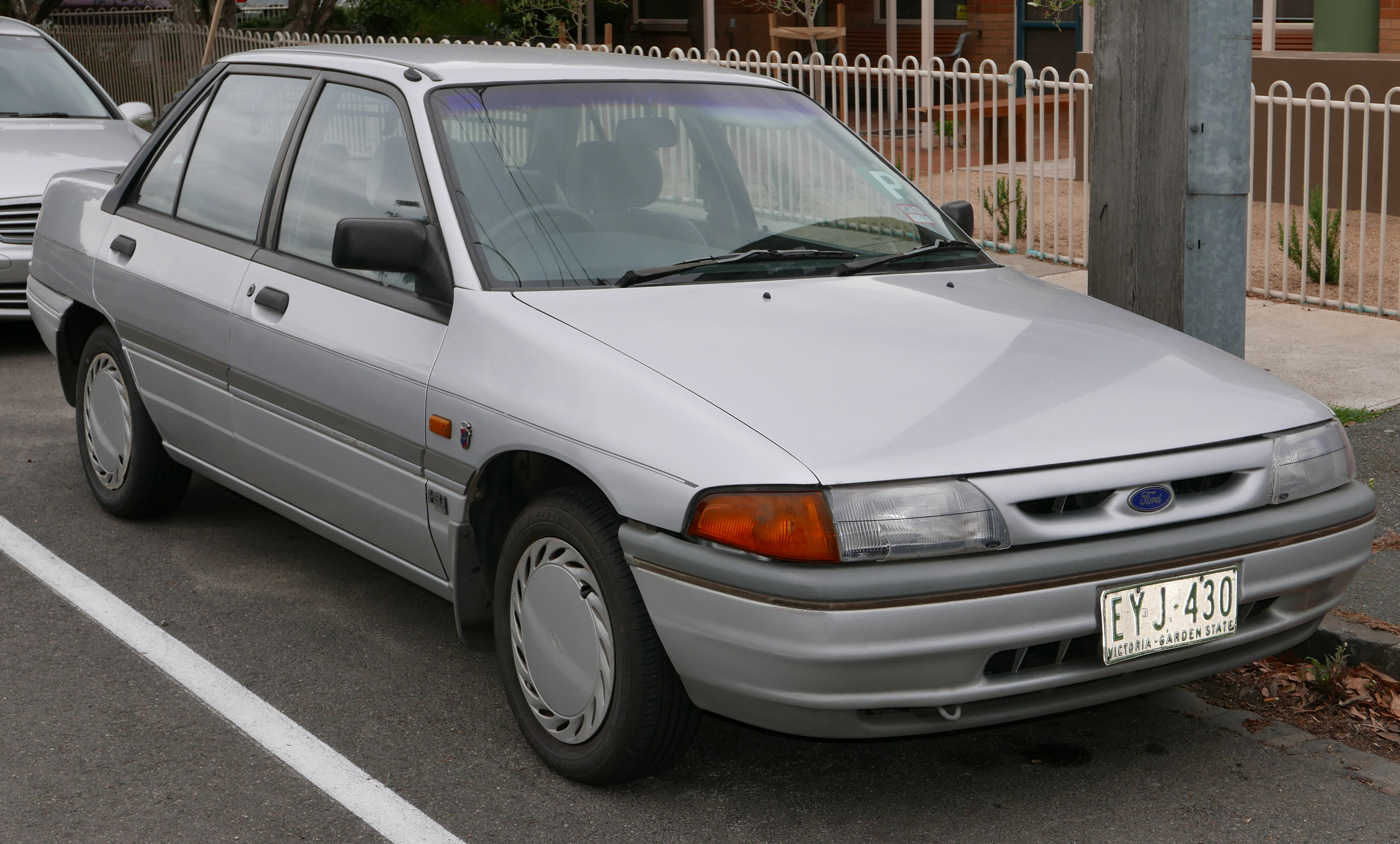
Ford Laser (KH) Ghia sedan (Australia)

=== Taiwan ===
The third generation Ford Laser was launched in May 1990 in Taiwan, with the additional Chinese name, Golden Laser (金全壘) for the third generation to be sold alongside the updated second generation model exclusively in Taiwan. The second generation models were reduced to a sedan with 5-speed manual transmission or a 3-speed automatic transmission and a station wagon with a 5-speed manual transmission. The third generation Laser was only offered as either a 4-door sedan or a 5-door liftback while the second generation station wagon bodystyle remains to be in production after production of the second generation model ceased in 1990.

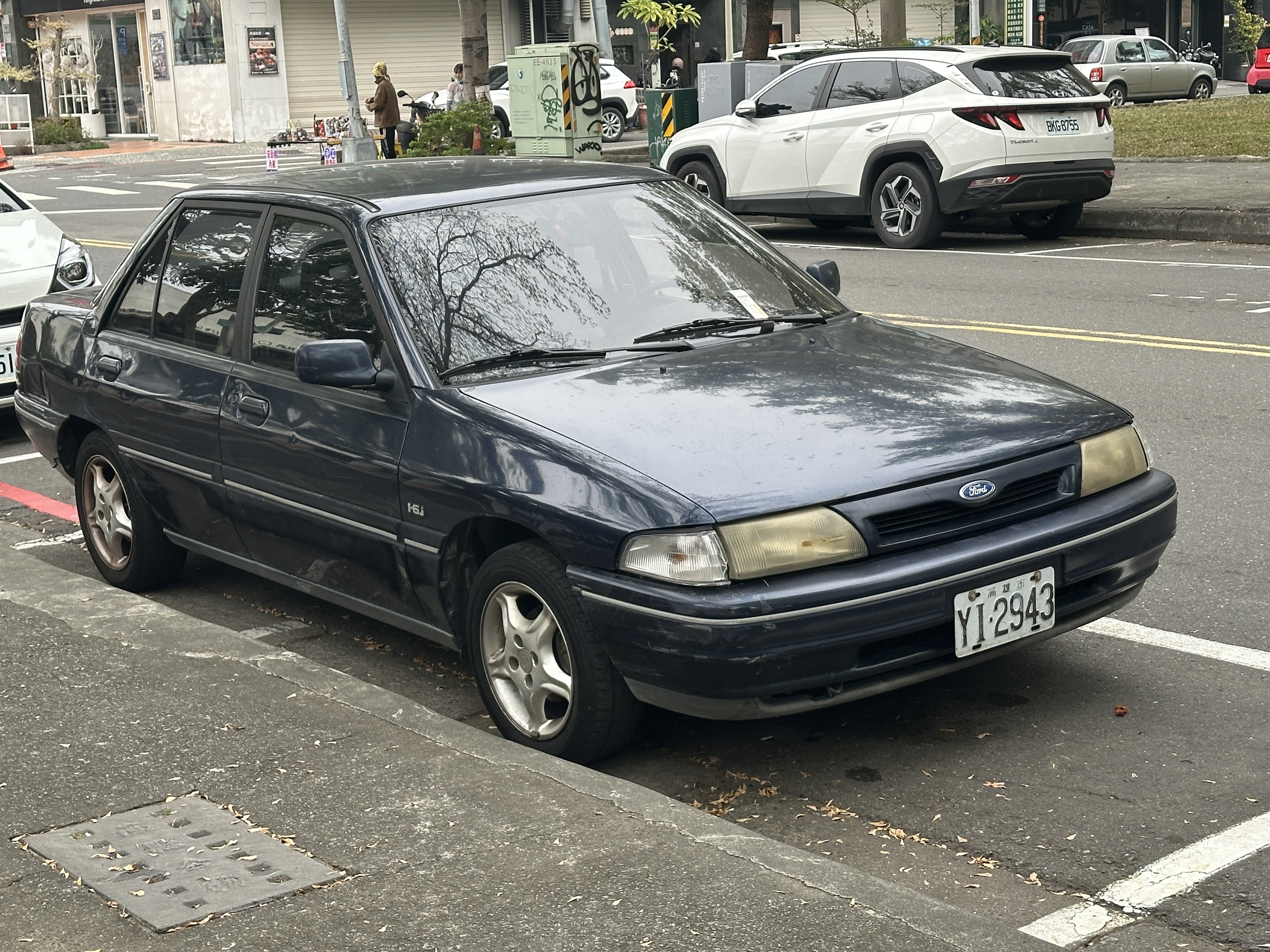
Ford Laser GLX (KH) sedan

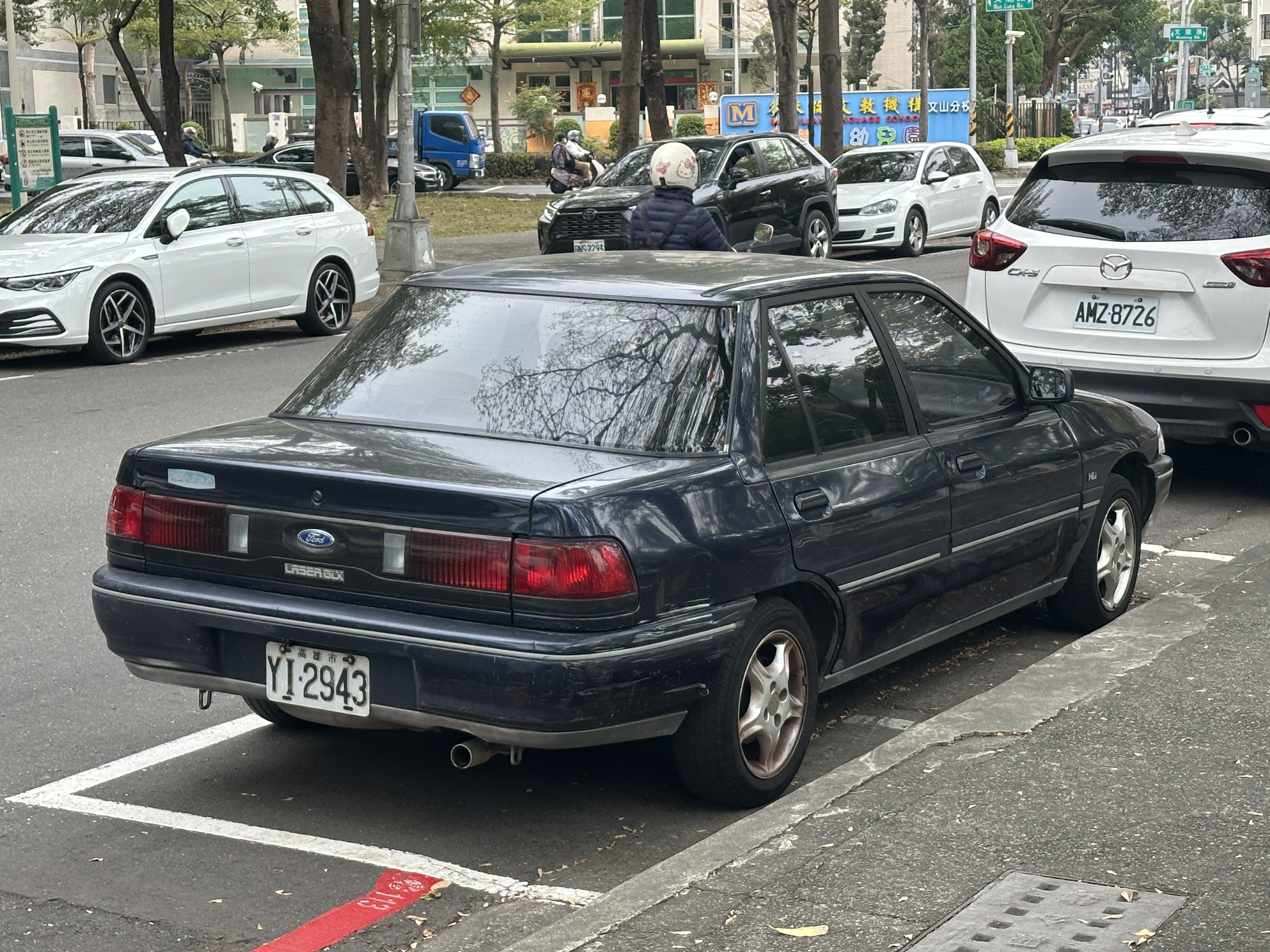
Ford Laser GLX (KH) sedan rear

=== Other markets ===
This generation of Laser was also sold in Cyprus and Malta. This generation was the basis of later Escort models sold in North America from 1990 for the 1991 model year, which is not to be confused with the model of the same name sold in Europe. The Escort name was retained for the new model due to both strong brand equity on the Escort name as well as Chrysler already using the Laser name for the Plymouth Laser. The Escort wagon seen in North America during this generation was unique to that continent and was not part of the Laser ranges elsewhere. There was also a luxurious version of the North American Escort, sold as the second generation Mercury Tracer.

In Indonesia, this generation was assembled locally (CKD) and sold from 1990 to 1996. The Laser was available in two body styles and three trim levels: 1.3 L sedan "Sonic", 1.6 L sedan "Gala" and a 5-door sporty hatchback "Champ" with a 1.8 L DOHC BP engine.

Engine specifications:
Note: Higher engine output are for the Japanese market Laser

- Mazda B3, 47–56 kW (63–75 hp; 64–76 PS) 1.3 L carb, 16V SOHC (XL)
- Mazda B5, 67 kW (90 hp; 91 PS) 1.5 L carb, 16V SOHC (Japanese GL-X, Ghia and S models)
- Mazda B5, 81–88 kW (109–118 hp; 110–120 PS) 1.5 L fuel-injected, 16V DOHC (Japanese Ghia DOHC and S DOHC models)
- Mazda B6, 64–67 kW (86–90 hp; 87–91 PS) 1.6 L carb, 16V SOHC (L, XL, GL, Livewire, Grand Slam, Indy, Collection, Horizon models)
- Mazda B6, 96 kW (129 hp; 131 PS) 1.6 L fuel-injected, 16V DOHC (Japanese Ghia DOHC)
- Mazda B8, 76 kW (102 hp; 103 PS) 1.8 L fuel-injected, 16V SOHC (Ghia, S and GLi models)
- Mazda BP, 92–99 kW (123–133 hp; 125–135 PS) 1.8 L fuel-injected, 16V DOHC (TX3 non-turbo models)
- Mazda BPT, 117–132 kW (157–177 hp; 159–179 PS) 1.8 L fuel-injected, 16V DOHC Turbo (Turbo 4WD models)
- Mazda PN, 43 kW (58 hp; 58 PS) 1.7 L diesel, 8v SOHC (Japanese market only)

== Fourth generation (KJ/KL/KM; 1994) ==
Fourth generation (KJ/KL/KM)
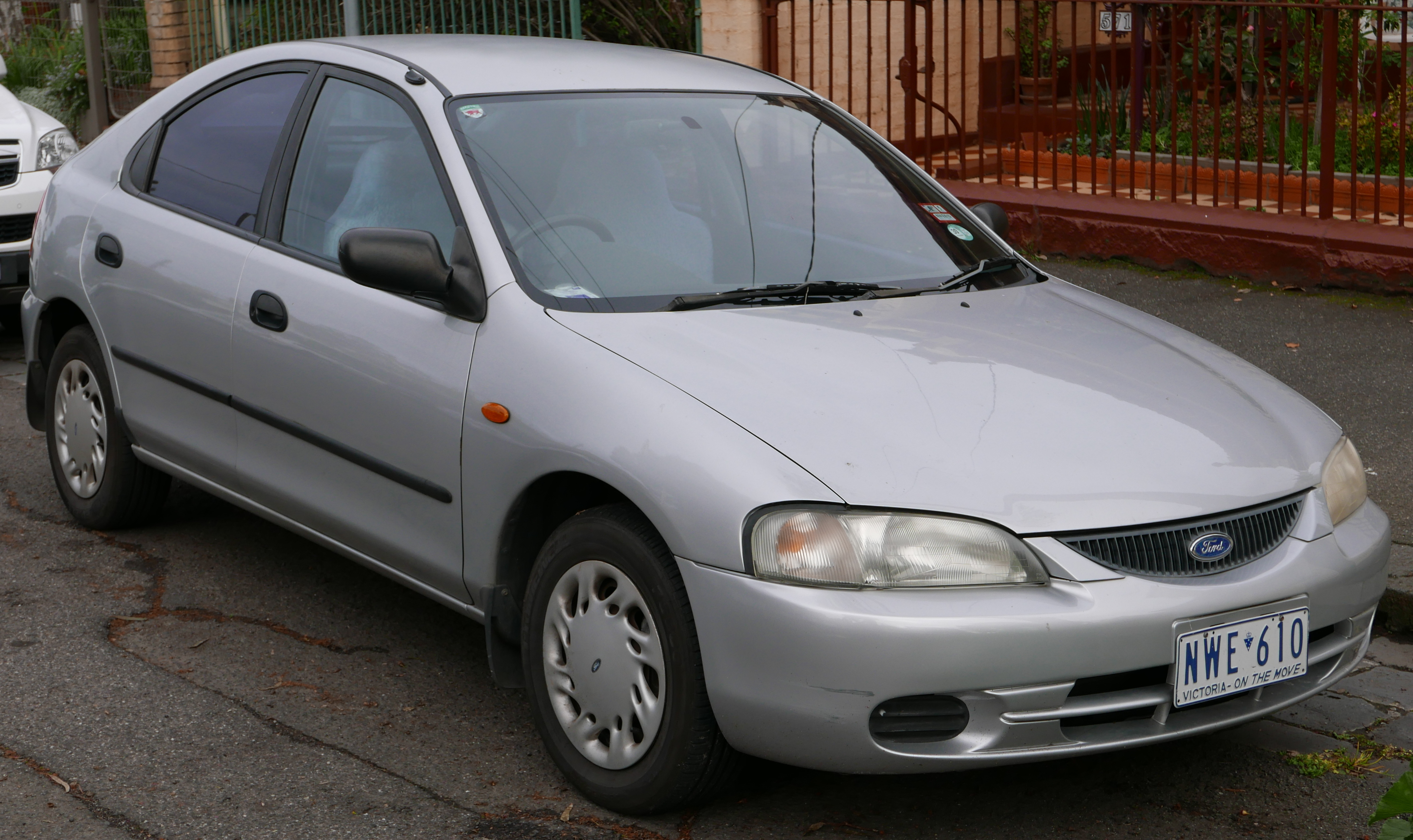
- Ford Laser (KJ) Liata LXi 5-door (Australia)

Overview
- Also called: Ford Aztec (Taiwan; 3-door); Ford Liata (Taiwan; 4-door)
- Production: 1994–1999

Body and chassis
- Body style: 4-door sedan 3-door hatchback 5-door hatchback

Powertrain
- Engine: 1.6 L B6 I4; 1.8 L BP I4
- Transmission: 5-speed manual 3/4-speed automatic

=== Japan ===
The fourth generation Laser was known as the BHA series in Japan. All sporting models were discontinued with the release of this model in the wake of poor sales and financial returns as Mazda scaled back operations and sought to rearrange market focus. Only the sedan and three-door hatchback were sold in Japan, the hatch being based on the Mazda Familia Neo.

=== Australia ===
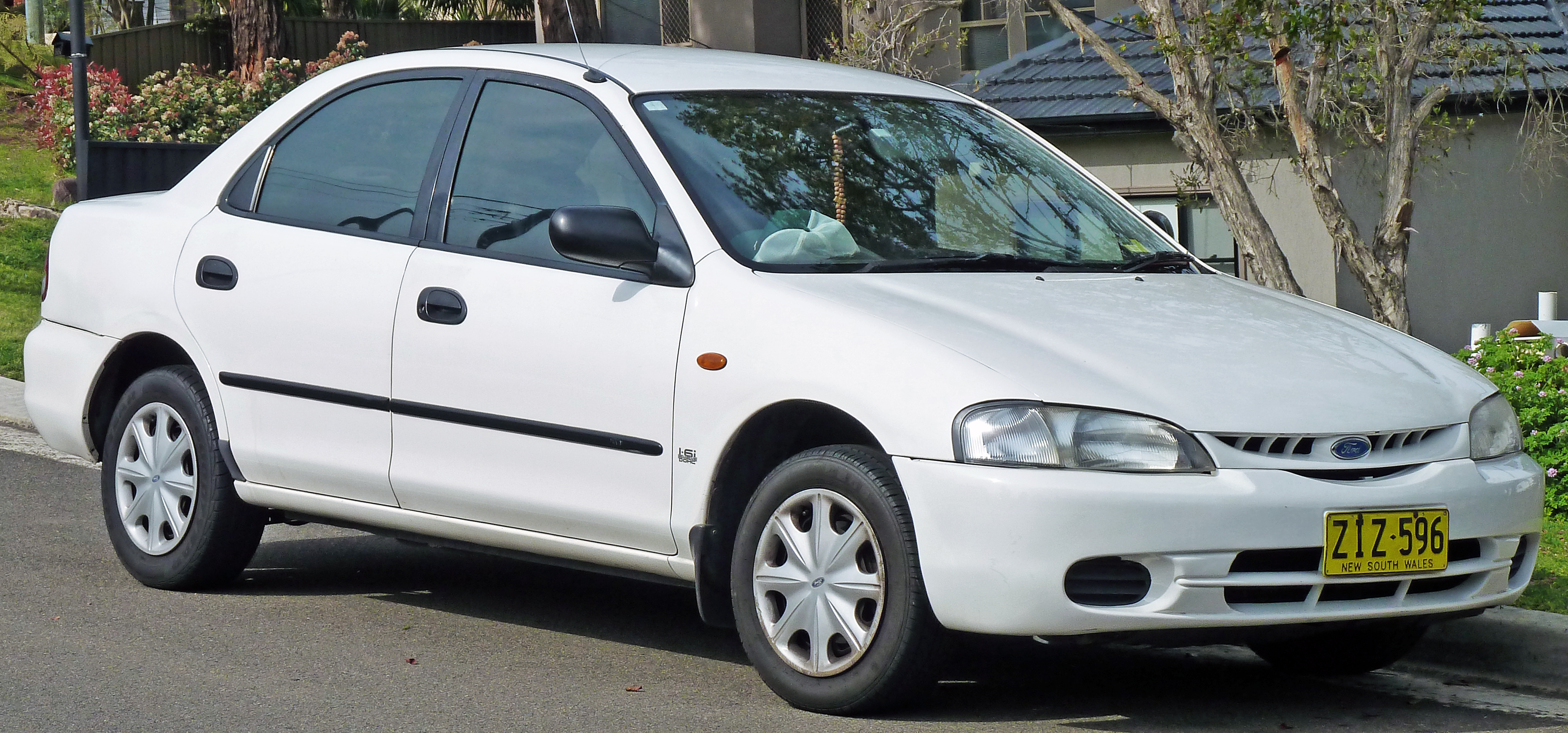

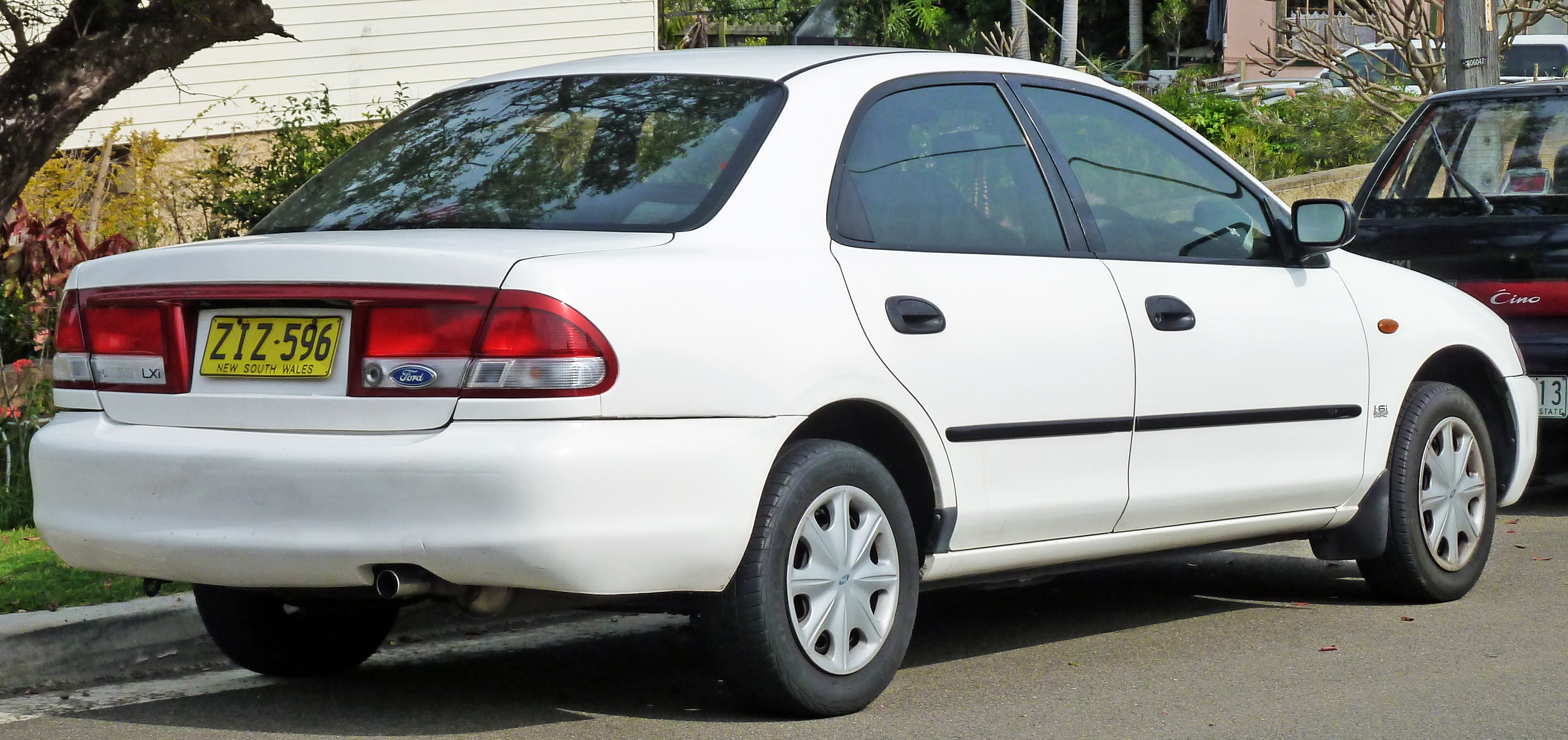
Ford Laser (KL) LXi sedan (Australia)

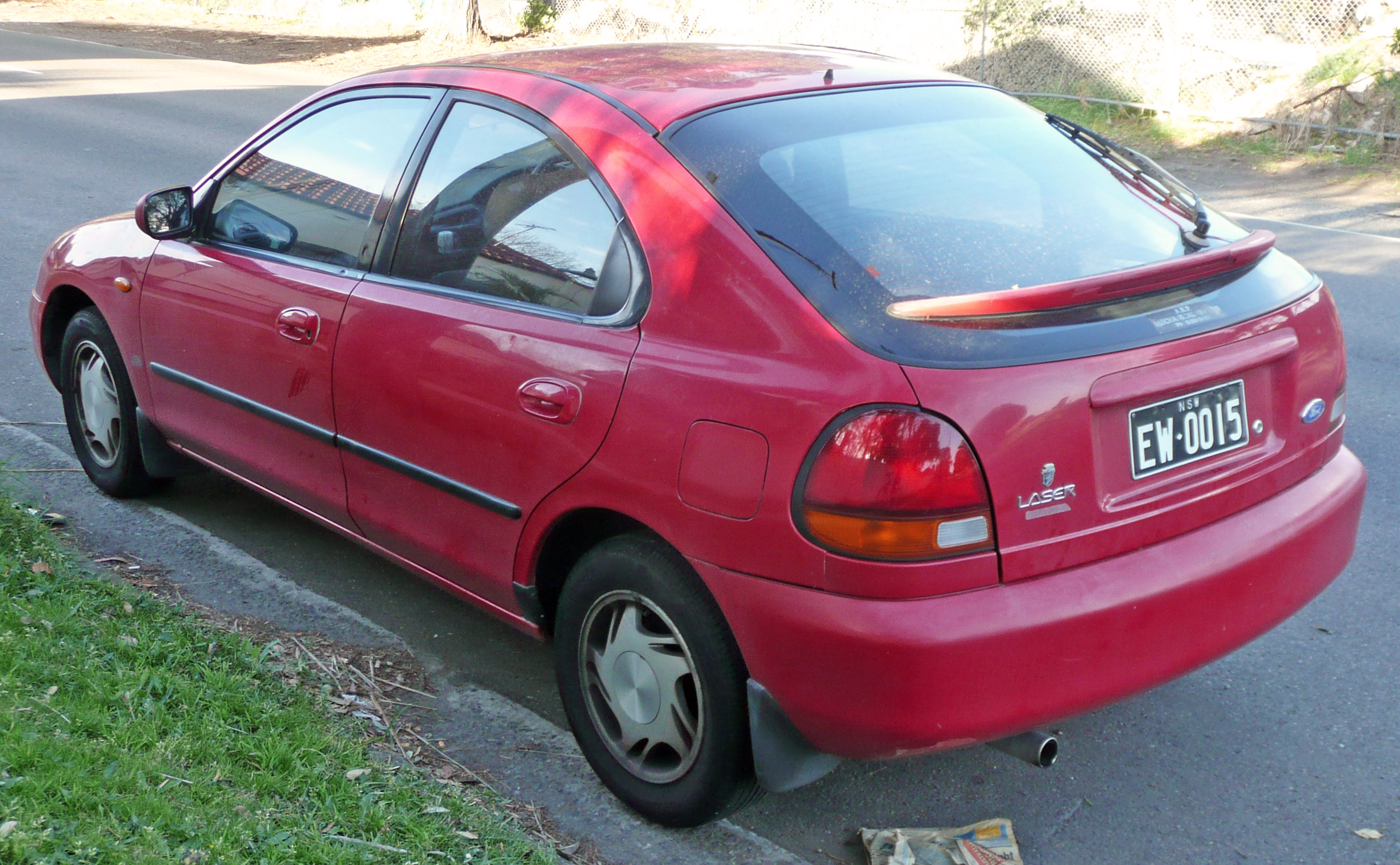
Ford Laser (KJ) Liata Ghia 5-door (Australia)

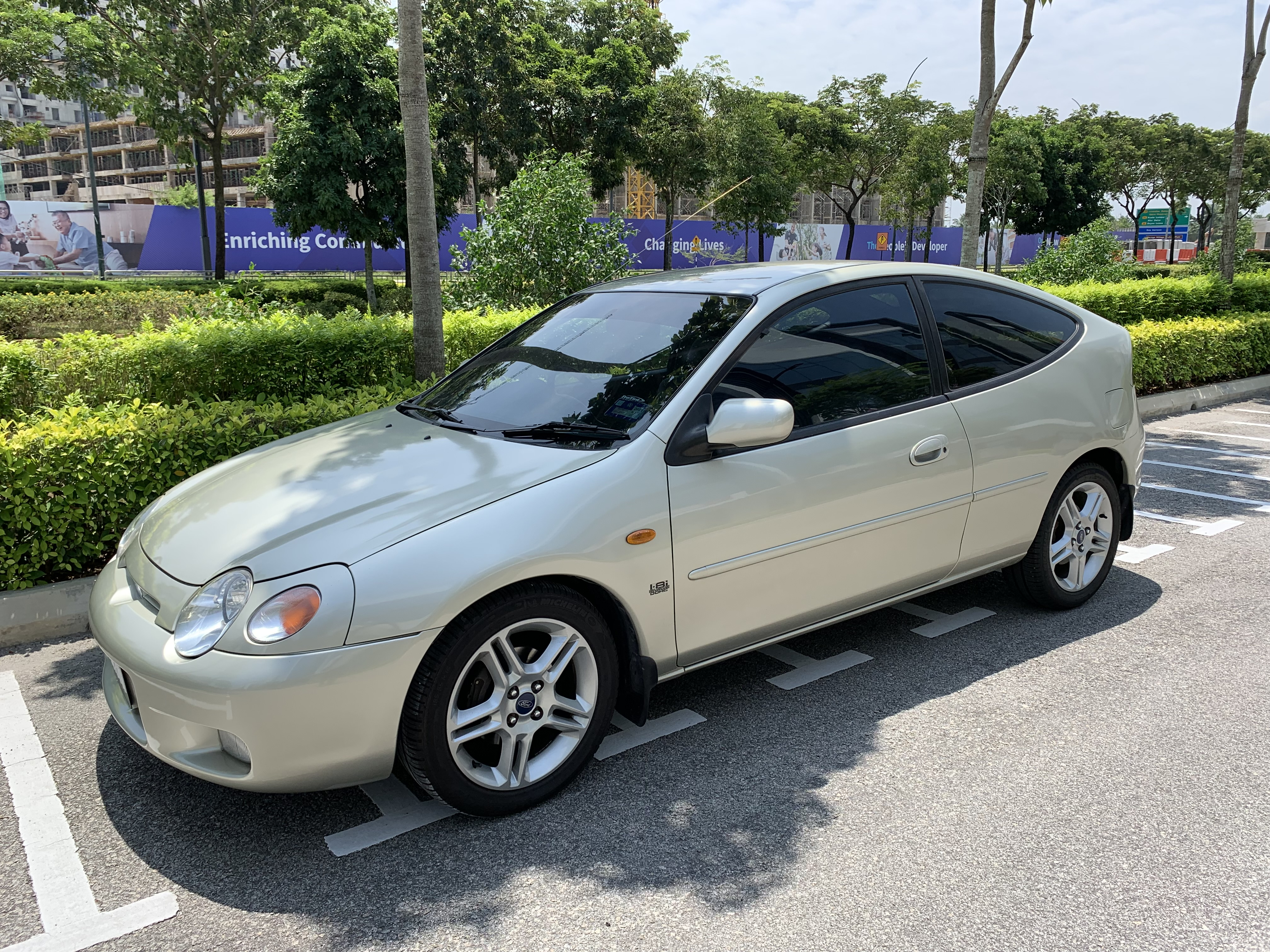
Ford Laser (KJ) Lynx 3-door (Malaysia)

The Japanese built KJ Laser in Australia went on sale in October 1994 represented a major change in design; looking very different from the previous KH model. The three-door hatchback was known as the Laser Lynx and the five-door as the Laser Liata.

The new KJ Laser was introduced in 1994 with variants, facelifts (KL of December 1996 and KM of December 1997) and engine driveline improvements continuing up until the last of the KM series were released in 1999. The KJ Laser was the first Laser manufactured wholly in Japan, following Ford Australia's decision to close their Flemington plant.

However, the KJ was disappointing in sales numbers mainly because of the smaller Festiva and other cheaper South Korean cars from Hyundai, Kia and Daewoo to which many conservative buyers flocked.

=== New Zealand ===
With the introduction of the KJ Laser in 1994, Ford New Zealand found itself in a unique position, offering three different generations of the Laser as new vehicles at once at its dealerships—the new KJ Laser, the previous-generation KH Laser as a five-door hatchback, and the older-shape KE Laser station wagon. These were assembled at the VANZ factory in Wiri, Auckland until 1997 when Ford NZ discontinued local assembly.

The second update KM Laser was not sold in New Zealand. The KL Laser, now replaced in Australia, continued to be sold alongside the European Ford Escort in New Zealand during 1997 but was discontinued locally at the end of the year, the Escort hatchback and sedan replacing it for just 16 months between January 1998 and May 1999 when the new KN Laser was introduced.

=== Taiwan ===
For 1995 in Taiwan, Ford Lio Ho Motor assembled the Laser sedan branded as the Ford Liata; the Lynx three-door version was rebranded as the Ford Aztec. However, the Liata five-door version was not available in Taiwan, although the Mazda 323 was sold as a rebadged version of the Laser sedan only.

=== Latin America ===
In Latin America, this generation of Laser was assembled in Colombia and Venezuela, alongside its Mazda 323 counterpart, known as the Mazda Allegro.

Engine Specifications:

- Mazda B6, 80 kW, 1.6L, 16V, DOHC ('LXi' models)
- Mazda BP, 92 kW, 1.8L, 16V, DOHC ('GLXi' and some 'LXi' models)

== Fifth generation (KN/KQ; 1999) ==
Fifth generation (KN/KQ)
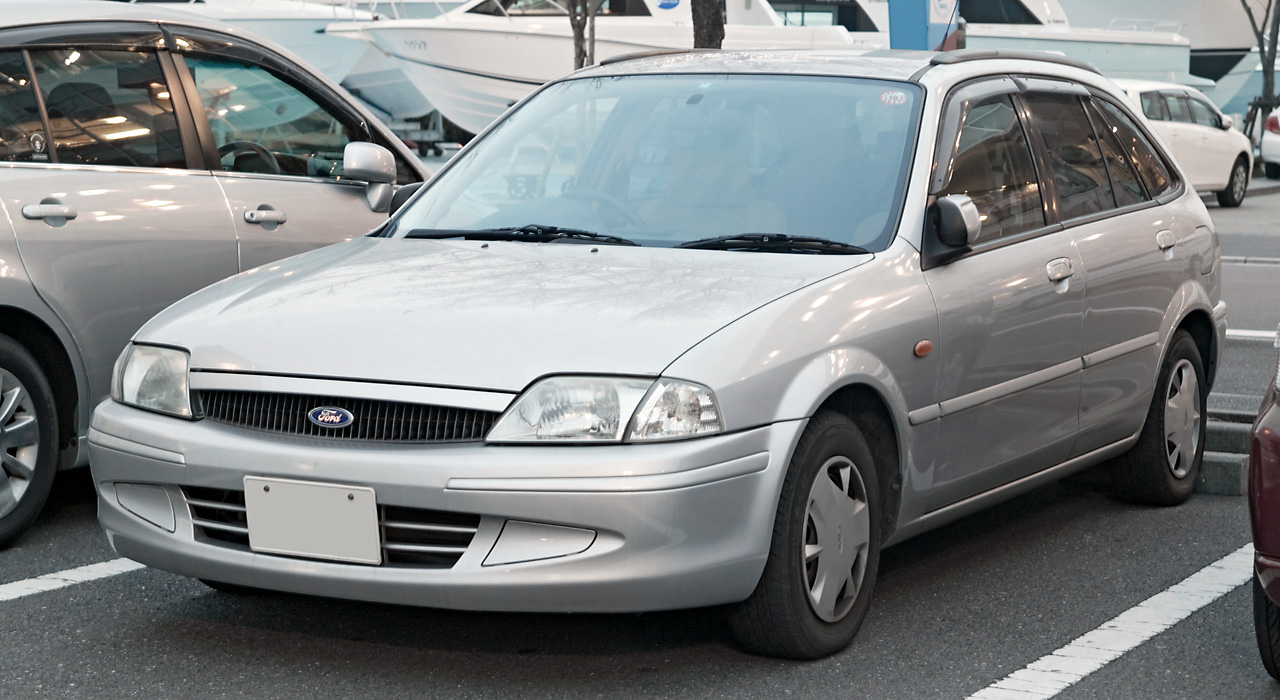
- Ford Laser (KN) Lidea hatchback (Japan)

Overview
- Also called: Ford Life (hatchback only); Ford Tierra/Activa (Taiwan, Thailand); Ford Lynx (Philippines, Malaysia, Indonesia)
- Production: 1999–2005

Body and chassis
- Body style: 4-door sedan 5-door hatchback

Powertrain
- Engine: 1.3 L B3-ME SOHC I4; 1.6 L ZM-DE DOHC I4; 1.8 L FP-DE DOHC I4; 2.0 L FS-DE DOHC I4; 2.0 L FS-ZE DOHC I4
- Transmission: 5-speed manual 4-speed automatic

Fifth generation "BJ" series models were renamed "Laser Lidea" in Japan in December 1998, with popularity falling even further than the previous model. Japanese production ceased at the end of 2002, to be replaced by the imported Ford Focus, which was already sold there since 2000.

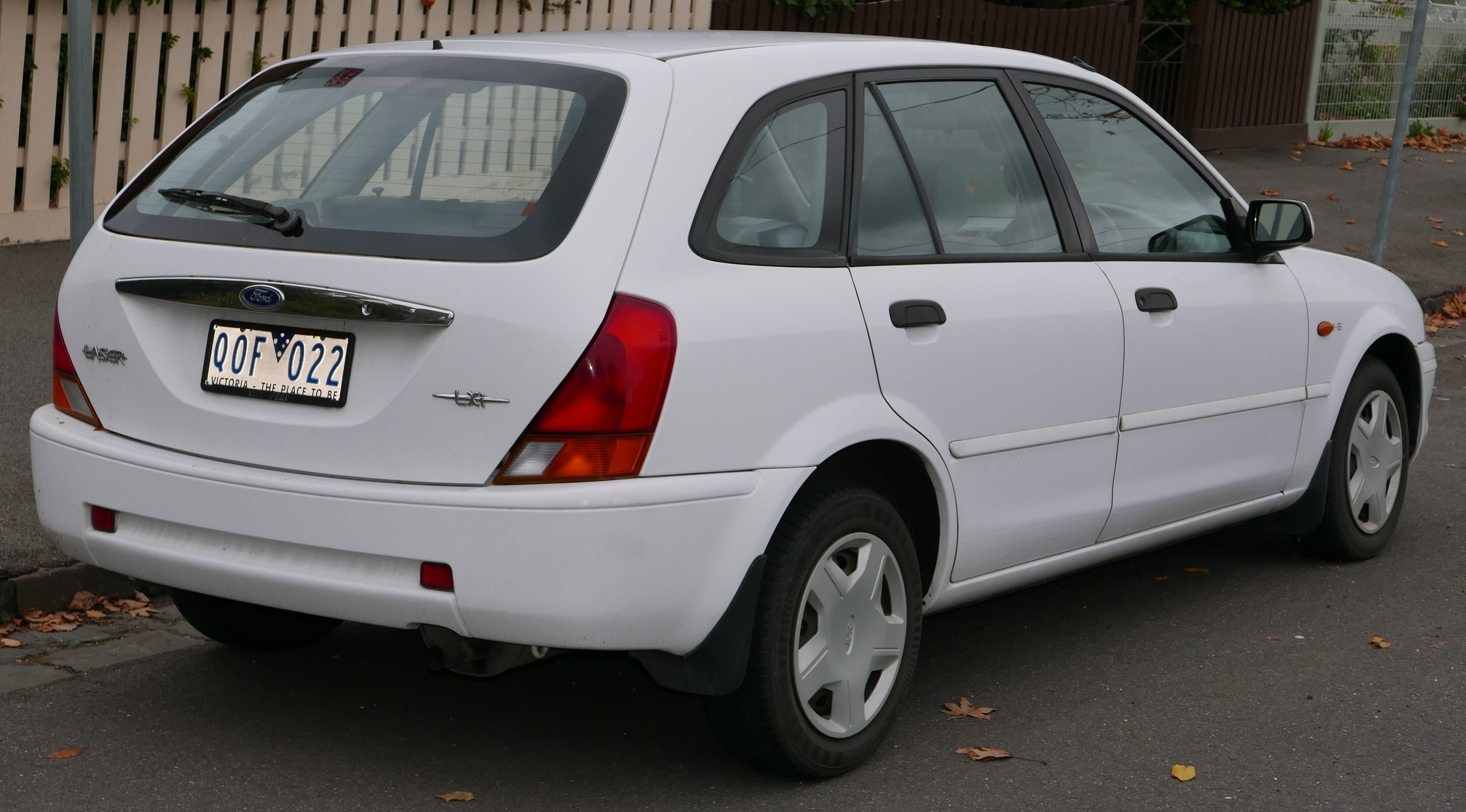
2000 Ford Laser (KN) LXi hatchback (Australia)

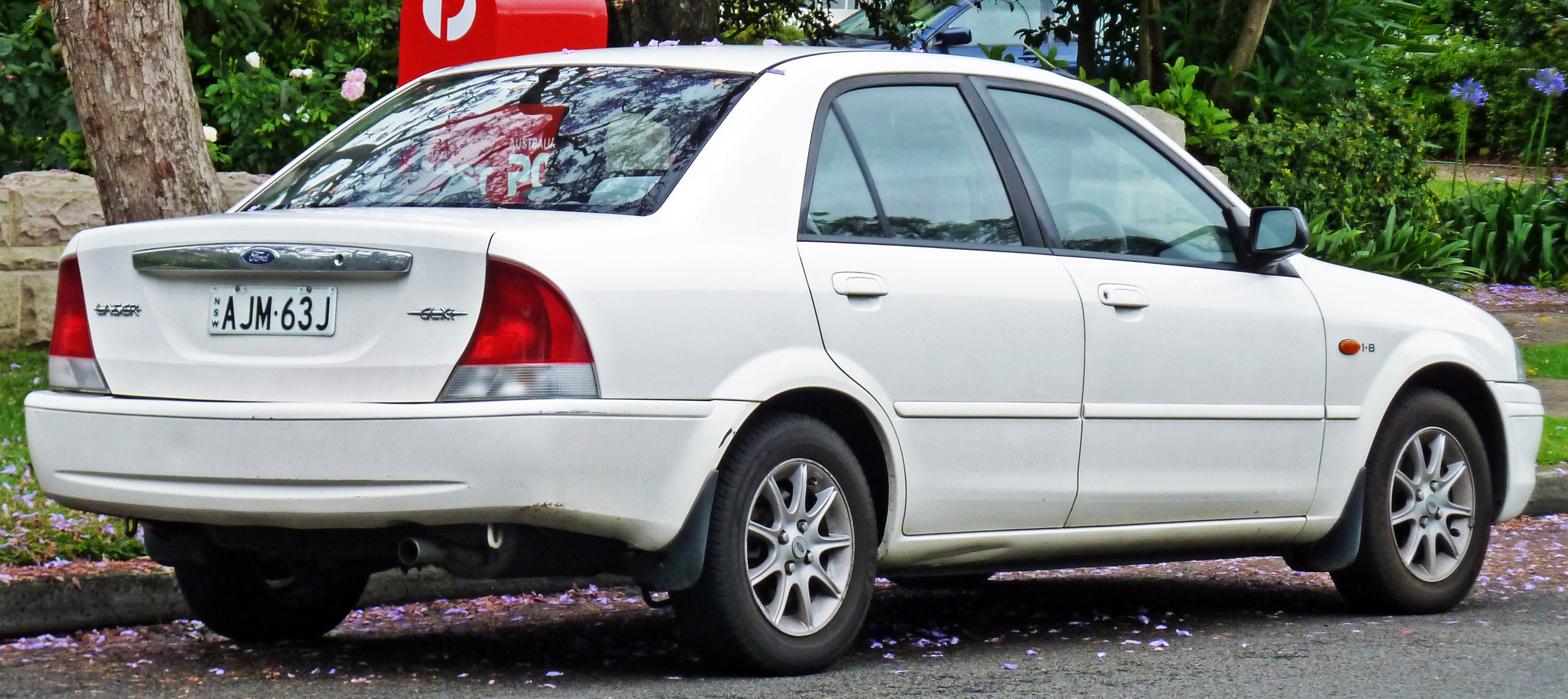
1999–2001 Ford Laser (KN) GLXi sedan (Australia)

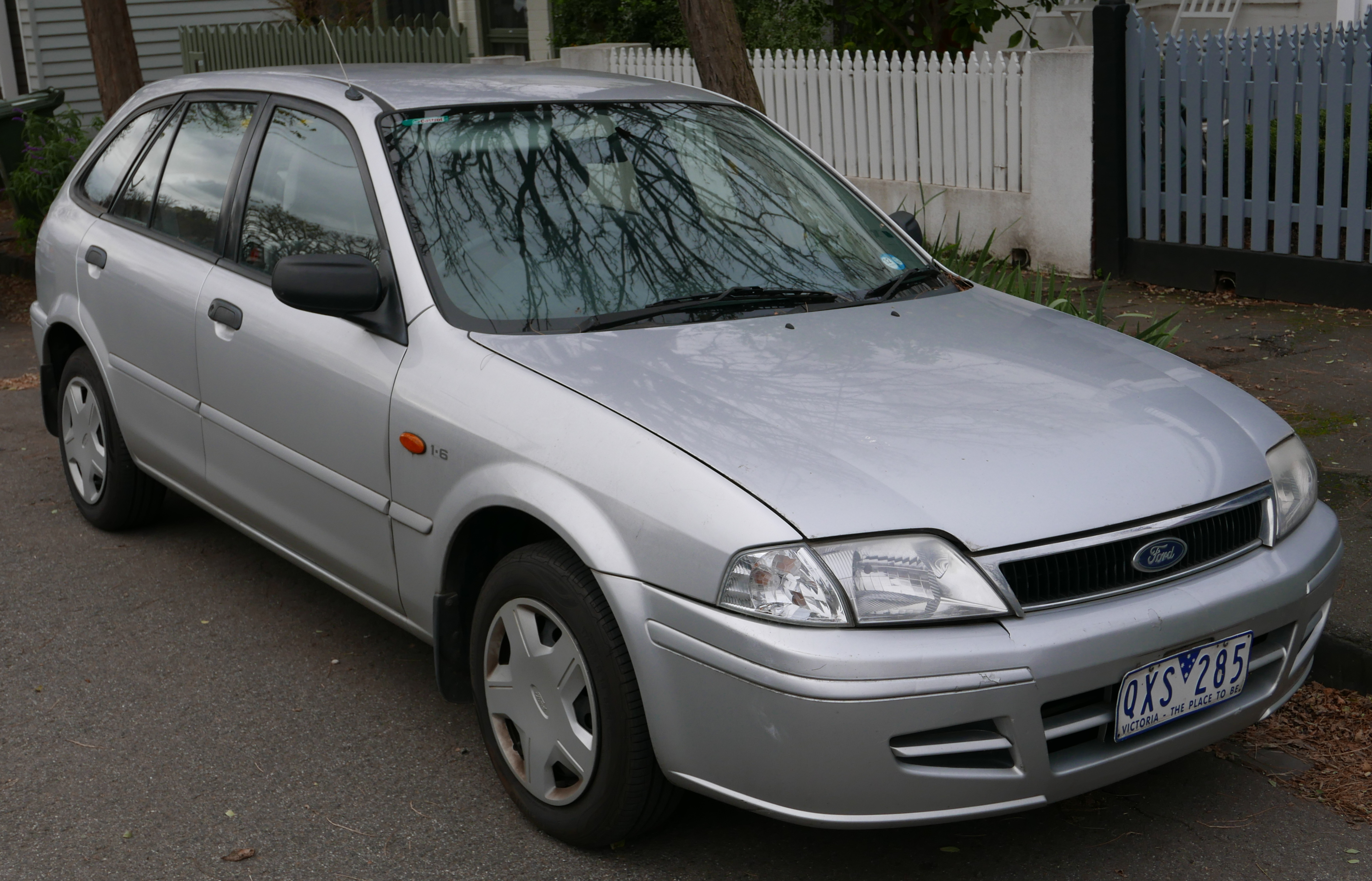

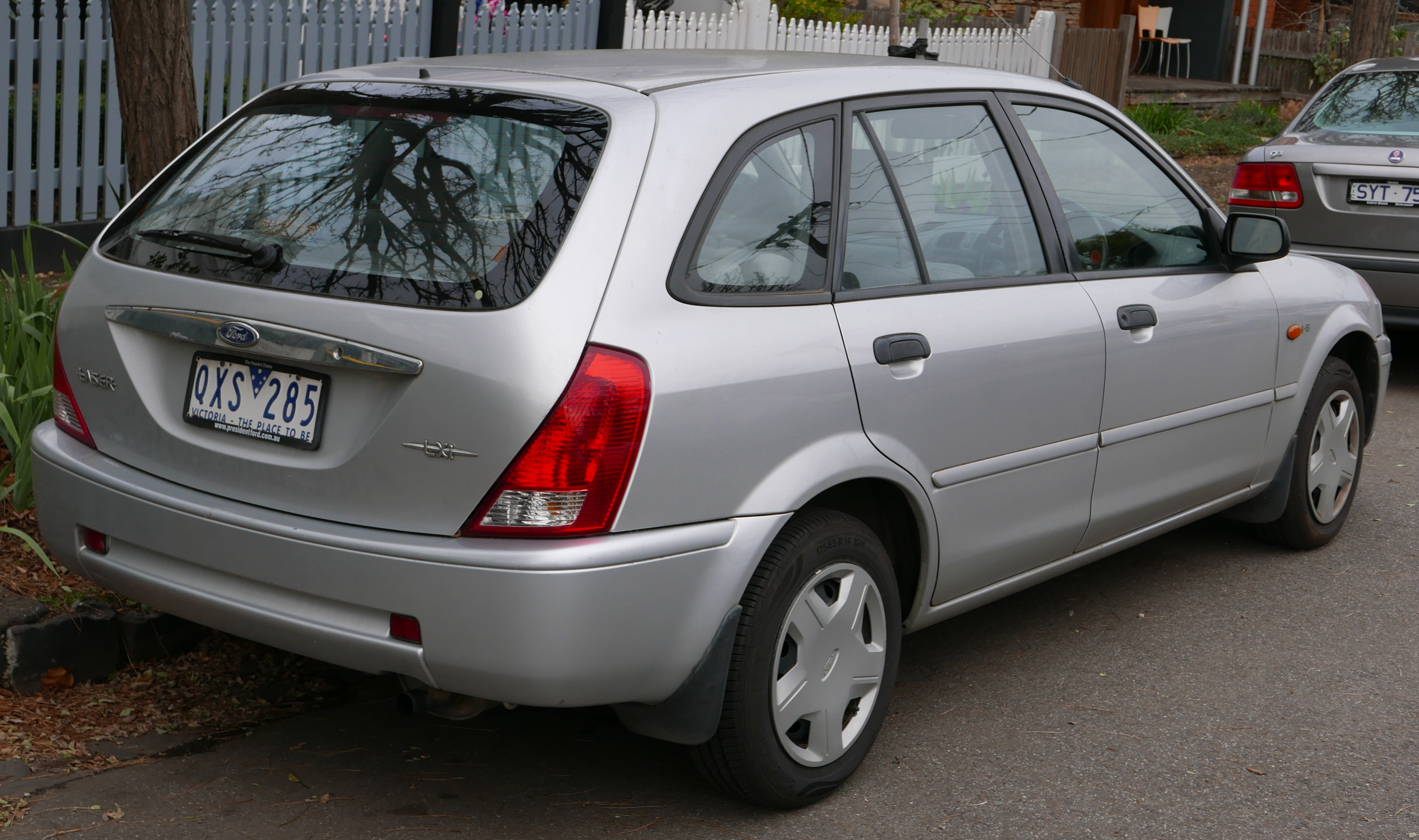
2001–2002 Ford Laser (KQ) LXi hatchback (Australia)

Released in Australia in May 1999, the KN Laser was the last generation of the Laser to be introduced. The model range was almost identical to the Mazda 323 on which it was based, which was the first time since the KE Laser. In February 2001, the KN received a minor facelift and became the KQ Laser. The big news with the KQ Laser was the addition of a 2.0-litre four-cylinder engine for the new top-spec "SR2", which was also the first sports-oriented Laser variant in almost five years, since the unpopular Laser Lynx was discontinued in 1996. A new "SR" level of trim, which sat below SR2 was also introduced at this time. The KQ can be distinguished from the earlier KN, with a new grille with chrome moulding, new headlights, revised tail lights, different exterior colours, and slightly revised interiors.

In March 2002, due to falling sales, Ford made one last attempt to restore the Laser's popularity to its former glory, by announcing minor upgrades to the SR2, and added three new exterior colours to the range, being "Goldrush", "Red Revenge", and "Electric Blue". Three engines were available, a 1.6-litre that was fitted to the LXi, a 1.8-litre that was fitted to the GLXi & SR, and a 2.0-litre that was exclusive to the SR2.

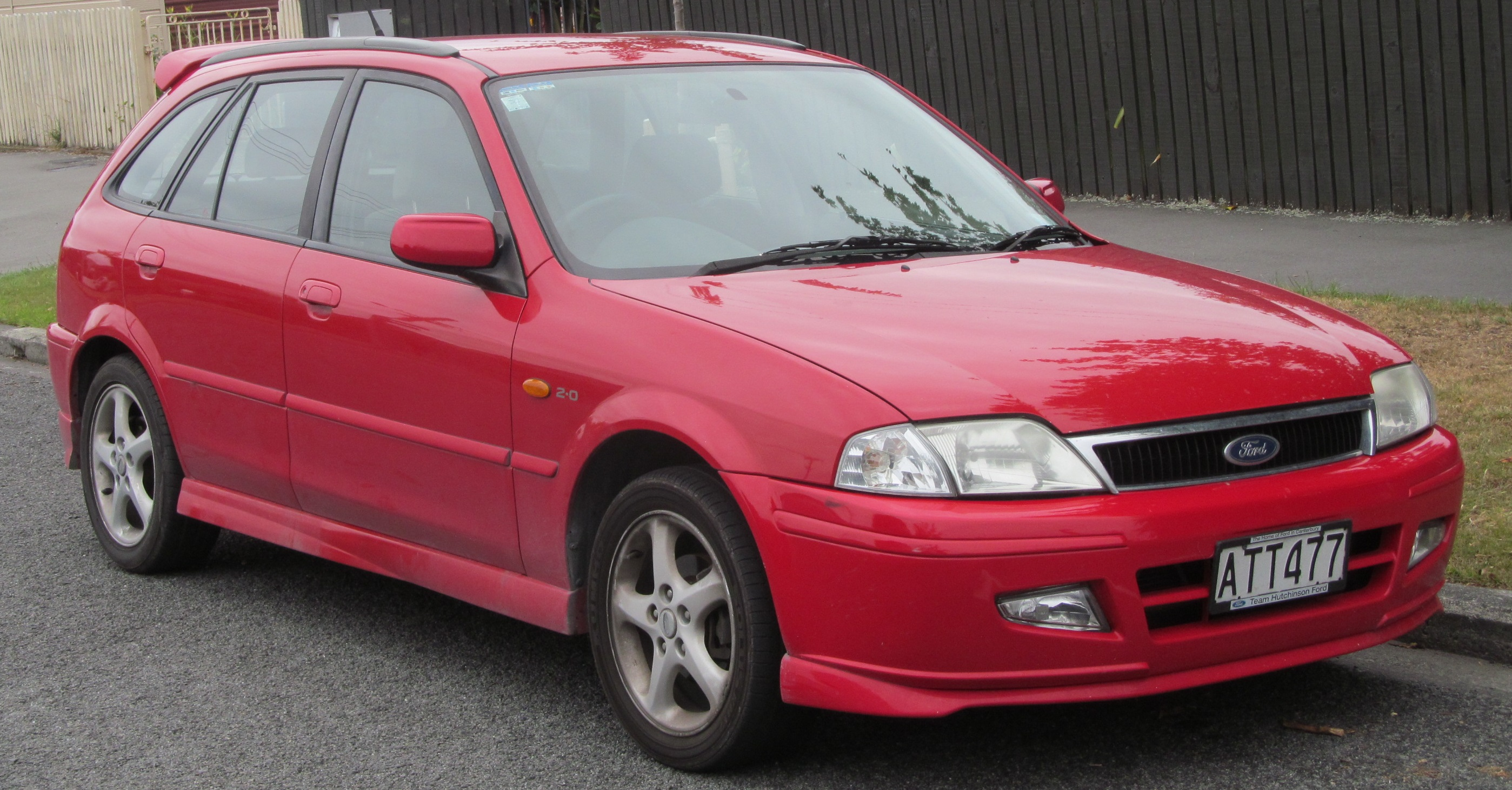
2002 Ford Laser XRi (New Zealand)

Despite the Laser having a good reputation with buyers in the marketplace, and many attempts from Ford to reignite interest in the model, it was unable to sell in reasonable numbers. In September 2002, Ford decided to discontinue the Laser in Australia, replacing it with the European-sourced Focus. However, the Laser continued in New Zealand until mid-2003, when it was also replaced by the facelifted Focus.

Model range:

- Laser LXi (sedan or hatchback)
- Laser GLXi (sedan or hatchback)
- Laser Deluxe 1.6
- Laser Ghia 1.8 AT/MT
- Laser SR (hatchback only)
- Laser SR2 (hatchback only), renamed Laser XRi in New Zealand

Engine specifications:

- Mazda 1.8 L FP-DE DOHC I4 91 kW (122 hp) and 163 N⋅m (120 ft⋅lbf)
- Mazda 2.0 L FS, 97 kW (130 hp) and 183 N⋅m (135 ft⋅lbf)
- Mazda 2.0 L FS-ZE (2001 Sport 20)
- Mazda 1.6 L ZM-DE 72 kW (97 hp) and 145 N⋅m (107 ft⋅lbf)

=== Ford Tierra ===
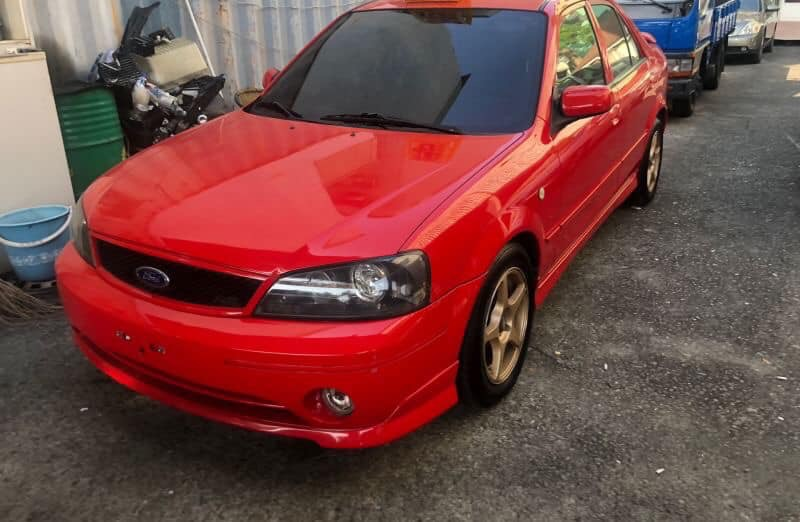

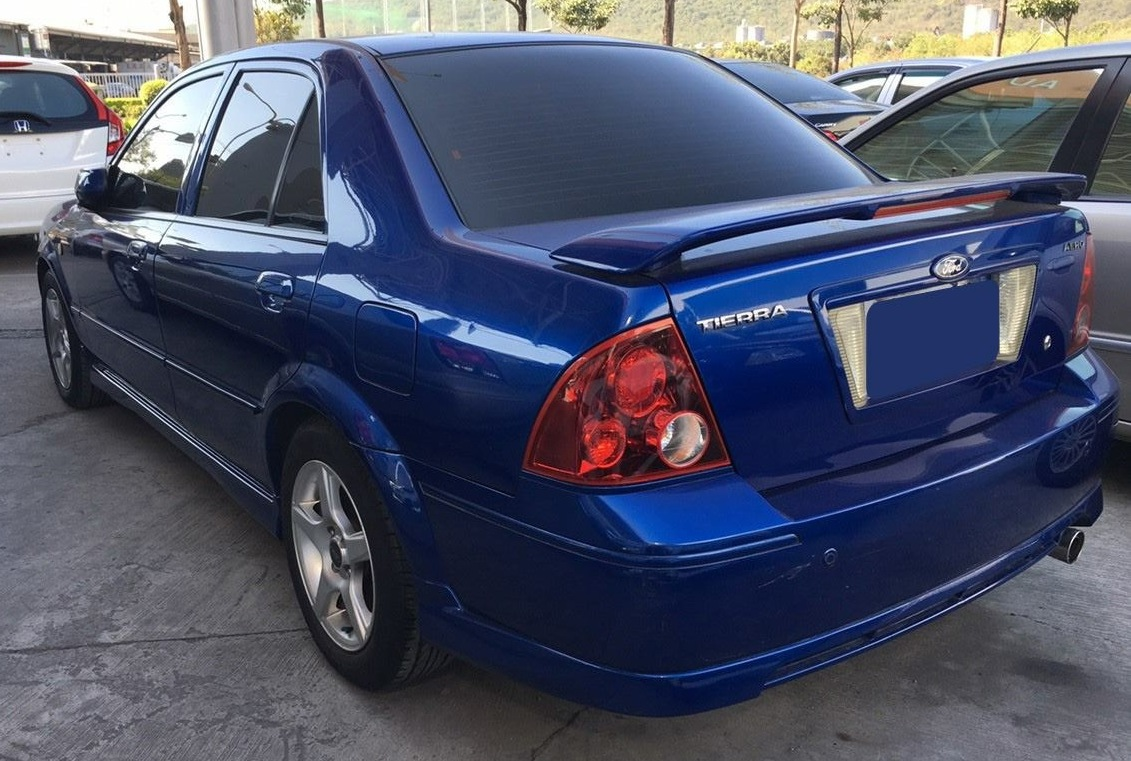
Ford Tierra Aero

In Taiwan, Ford Lio Ho Motor renamed the KN/KQ Laser sedan as Ford Tierra while the Laser hatchback was renamed Ford Life, and both was sold as rebadged versions of the pre-facelift Mazda 323 BJ generation without any exterior redesigns. The KQ facelift design was directed by Ford Lio Ho Motor and was based on the Australian KN Laser as the rear fenders are different from the Mazda-derived Ford Tierras. A facelift of the Tierra arrived in the early-to-mid 2000s, distinguished by its completely new front fenders, new hood, a new grille with chrome moulding, new headlights, revised tail lights, new trunk lid, different exterior colours, and slightly revised interiors.

When the facelift for the Tierra was introduced, the pre-facelift model sold alongside it, renamed as Ford Activa and acting as a cheaper alternative. The Activa was sold in both sedan and hatchback forms and a wider variety of colour choices was also available while the Tierra facelift was only offered in sedan form and was offered in a variety of trim levels. The KQ Tierra was sold originally as the Tierra LS and the Tierra RS with a slight performance tuning and body kit. In 2005, the RS was replaced by the Tierra Aero which was a slightly tuned down version of the RS, and later in 2007, the Tierra GT was introduced and later the Tierra XT with a redesigned body kit before the model was replaced by the European second generation Ford Focus.

=== Ford Lynx ===
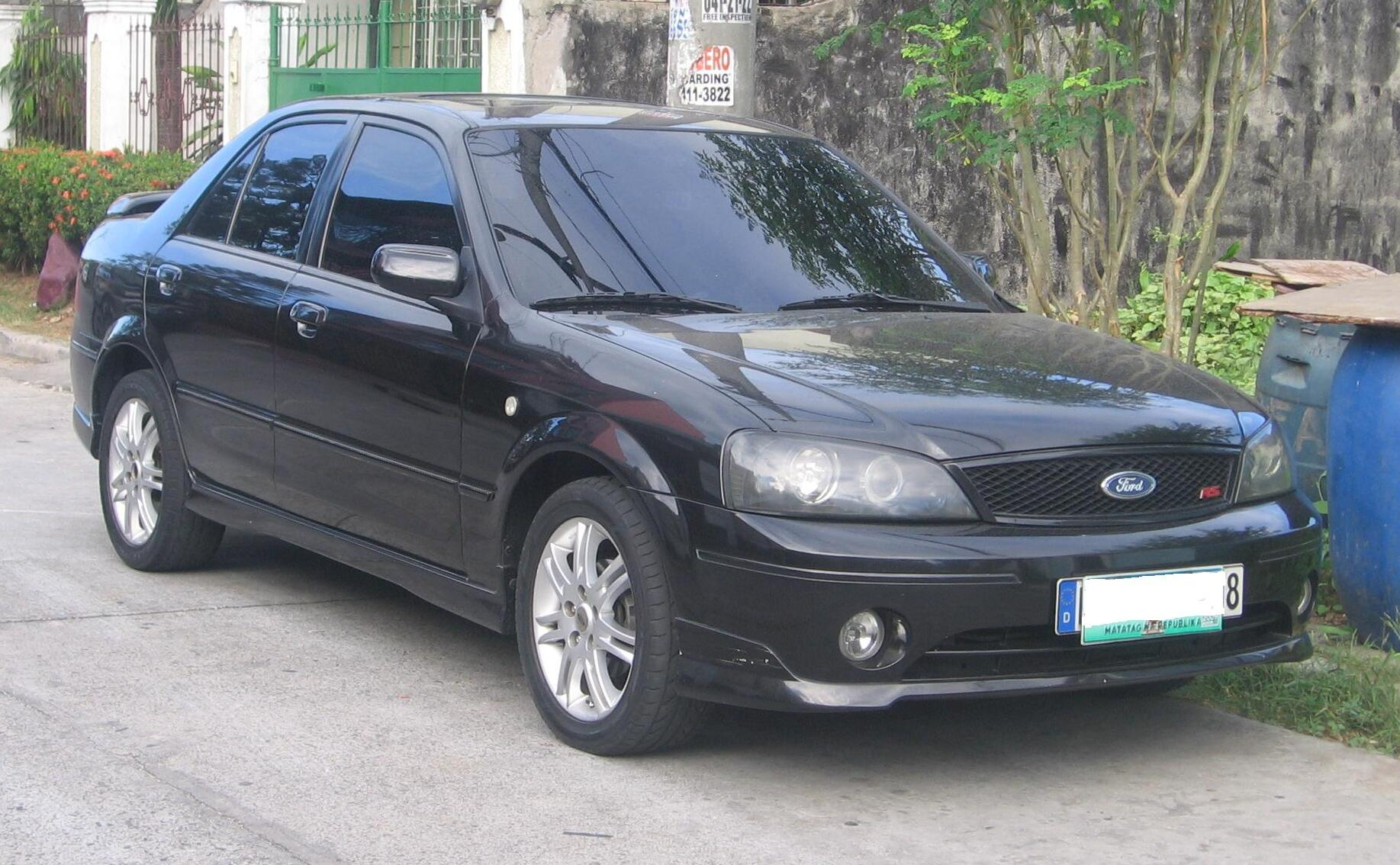
2005 Ford Lynx RS

The fifth generation Laser were marketed in the Philippines and Malaysia as the Lynx.

In the Philippines, two grades were offered; the GSi and Ghia. Both were powered with a 1.6-litre petrol engines. Transmission choices were a 5-speed manual or 4-speed automatic, available in both grades. In 2002, the Lynx received its first facelift, featuring newly designed headlights and tail lights, front and rear bumpers, newly designed chrome grille and trunk lid, newly wheel designs and exterior colors, and slightly revised interiors. The higher-grade came with an electronic sunroof and luxury based color-toned interior. The lower-grade called "LSi" was added into the lineup, which was discontinued until June 2004. It is powered with a 1.3-litre engine with only manual transmission, no power features (except for steering) and steel wheels with hubcaps. In 2004, another facelift took place, featuring new taillights, newly front and rear bumpers, newly designed chrome grille and trunk garnish, and newly wheel design for the higher-grade. Also added a new trim called RS, firstly known as the RS Centennial Edition in March 2004. It had a 2.0-litre engine, making 143 hp with only 5-speed manual transmission. Albeit with sporty body kits and spoiler, strut bar, electronic sunroof, smoked headlights, mesh grille with RS emblem, and 17-inch 7-spoke alloy wheels. Available colors were Red and Black Metallic.

In Malaysia, only one grade was originally offered; the 1.6-litre Ghia. It had front discs and rear drum brakes. Transmission choices were a 5-speed manual or 4-speed automatic. In 2002, the Lynx received its first facelift. The RS grade was released in March 2004 with automatic transmission along with a second facelift.

The Laser was replaced in most markets around the world by the European-sourced Focus, designated as one of Ford's "world cars". The Mazda 323's replacement, the first generation Mazda3, was also based on the same platform as the Focus, continuing the tradition of both companies having products in this market segment around the world sharing common componentry.
