= Ford Courier =

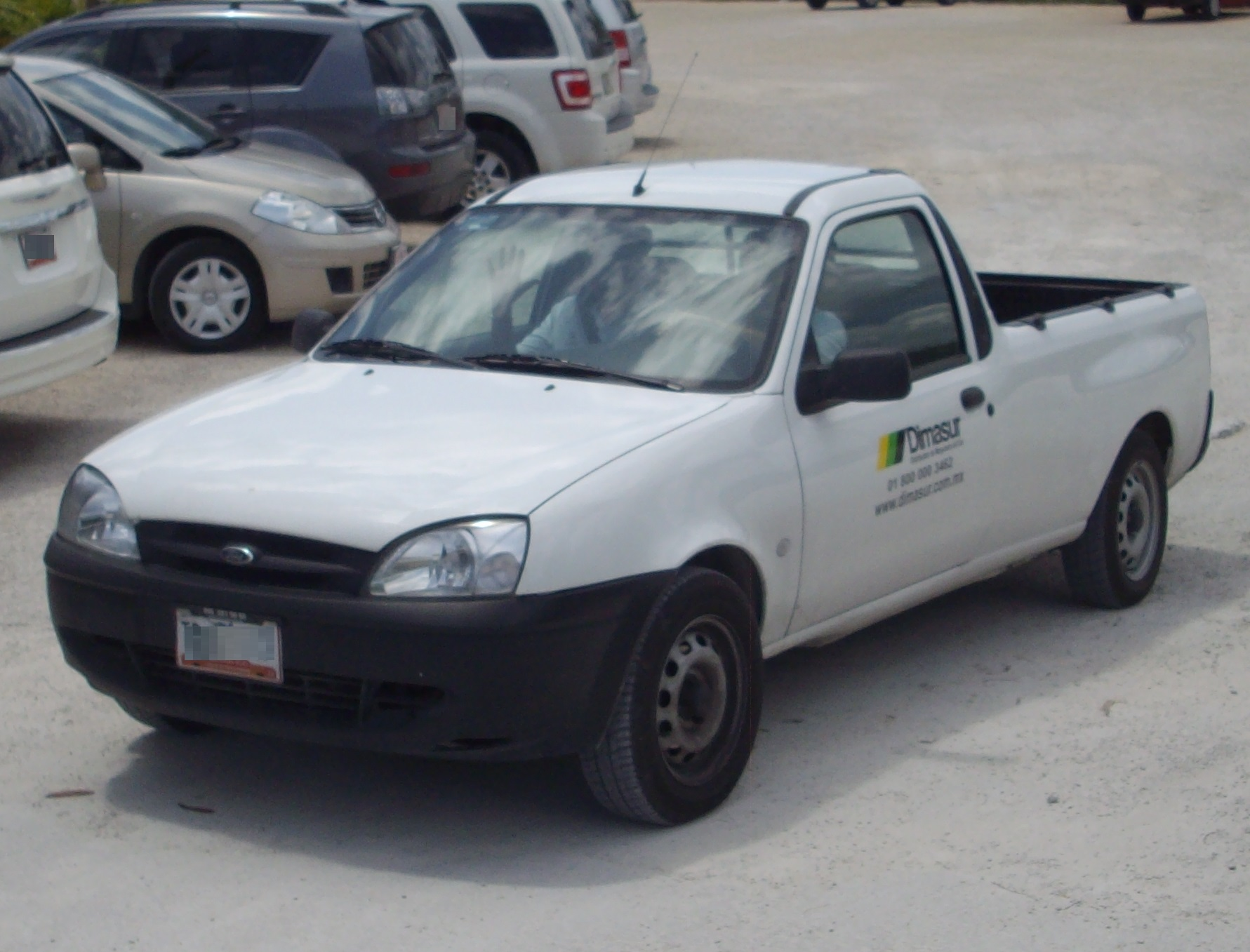
- The most recent model in the Ford Courier series, developed by Ford Brazil and introduced in 1998

Overview
- Manufacturer: Ford
- Production: 1952–1960; 1971–2013
- Model years: 1952–1960 (sedan delivery); 1972–2007 (compact pickup); 1991–2002 (compact panel van); 1998–2013 (coupe utility)

Chronology
- Successor: Ford Transit Courier (Europe); Ford Transit Connect (Europe); Ford Ranger; Ford Ranger (T6) (Europe and Brazil); Ford Maverick (Americas)

Ford Courier is a model nameplate used by Ford since the early 1950s. The Courier moniker has been used on a variety of vehicles all around the world since it was first used in North America for a sedan delivery. The Courier nameplate was also used by Ford for a series of compact pickup trucks (produced by Mazda) and would also see use by Ford of Europe denoting a Fiesta-based panel van. Ford Brazil used the nameplate for a Fiesta-based coupe utility pickup marketed across Latin America.

During the 2000s, the Courier pickup truck was replaced by the Ranger nameplate (which replaced the Courier in North America for 1983); the Courier panel van was replaced by the Ford Transit Connect in 2002. For 2014, the stand-alone Courier name was withdrawn, but returned as the Transit Courier, the smallest vehicle of the Ford Transit van series.

== Sedan delivery (1952–1960) ==
From 1952 to 1960, the Ford Courier nameplate was used for the sedan delivery bodystyle of the full-size Ford line. Sharing its body with the two-door Ford station wagon, the Courier was intended for use primarily as a commercial vehicle, replacing the rear seating area with storage; the side windows were replaced with painted steel panels. Ford also marketed a similar vehicle derived from the F-Series pickup truck named the panel delivery; both of these served as precursors of the modern-day cargo van.

Marketed exclusively as a two-door vehicle, the Courier was initially designed with a side-hinged rear cargo access door (unique to the model line). For 1957 and 1958, the Courier adopted the two-piece "clamshell" rear door of the Ford Parklane and Ford Del Rio station wagons.

For 1959 and 1960, to lower production costs of the model line, the Courier adopted the body of the two-door Ford Ranch Wagon in its entirety, distinguished only by its rear cargo area.

For the 1961 model year, Ford discontinued the Courier sedan delivery and F-Series panel delivery, replacing both model lines with the Ford Econoline cargo van. The two-door sedan delivery bodystyle was made part of the compact Ford Falcon range, offered through the 1964 model year.

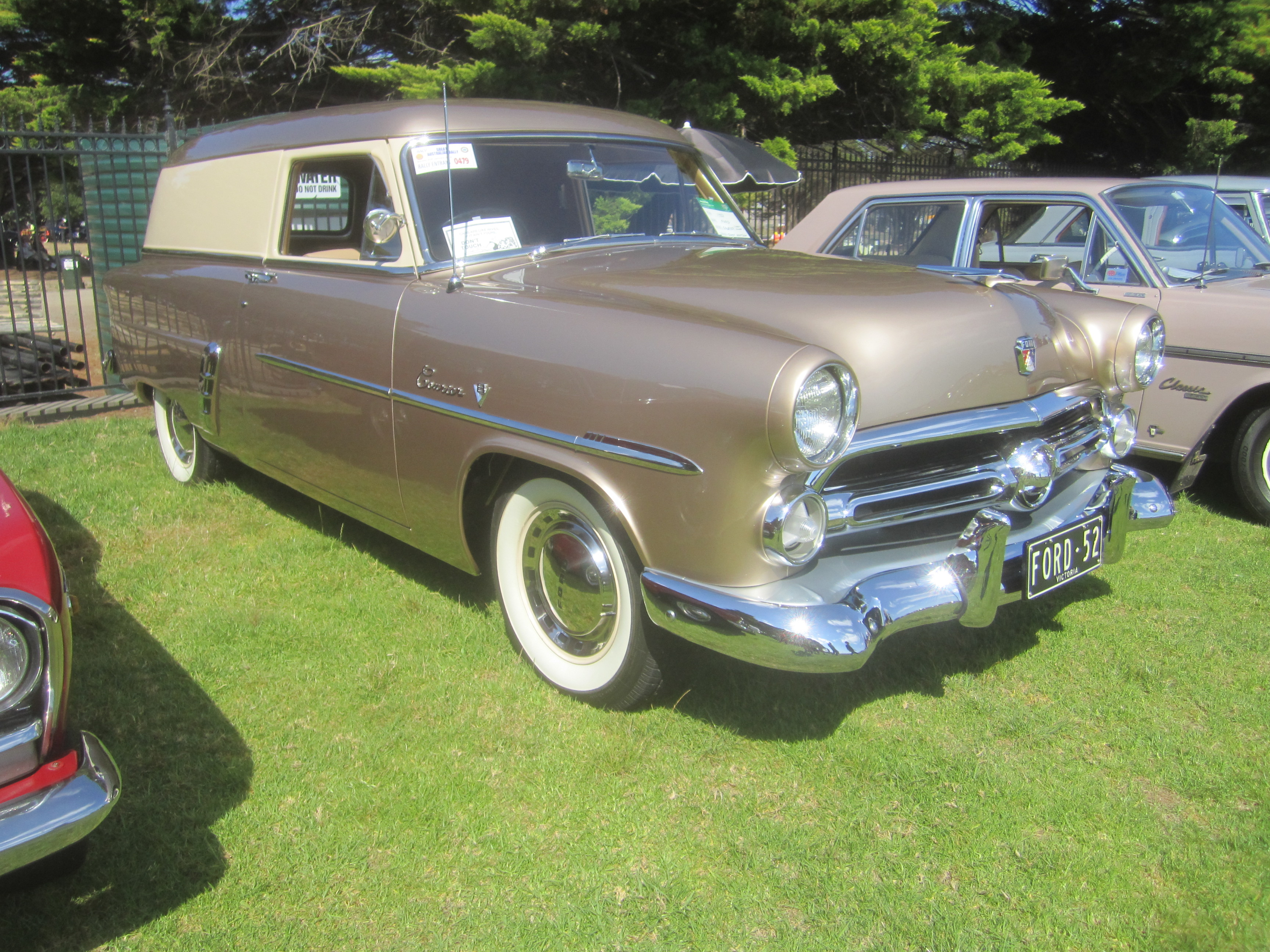
1952 Ford Courier

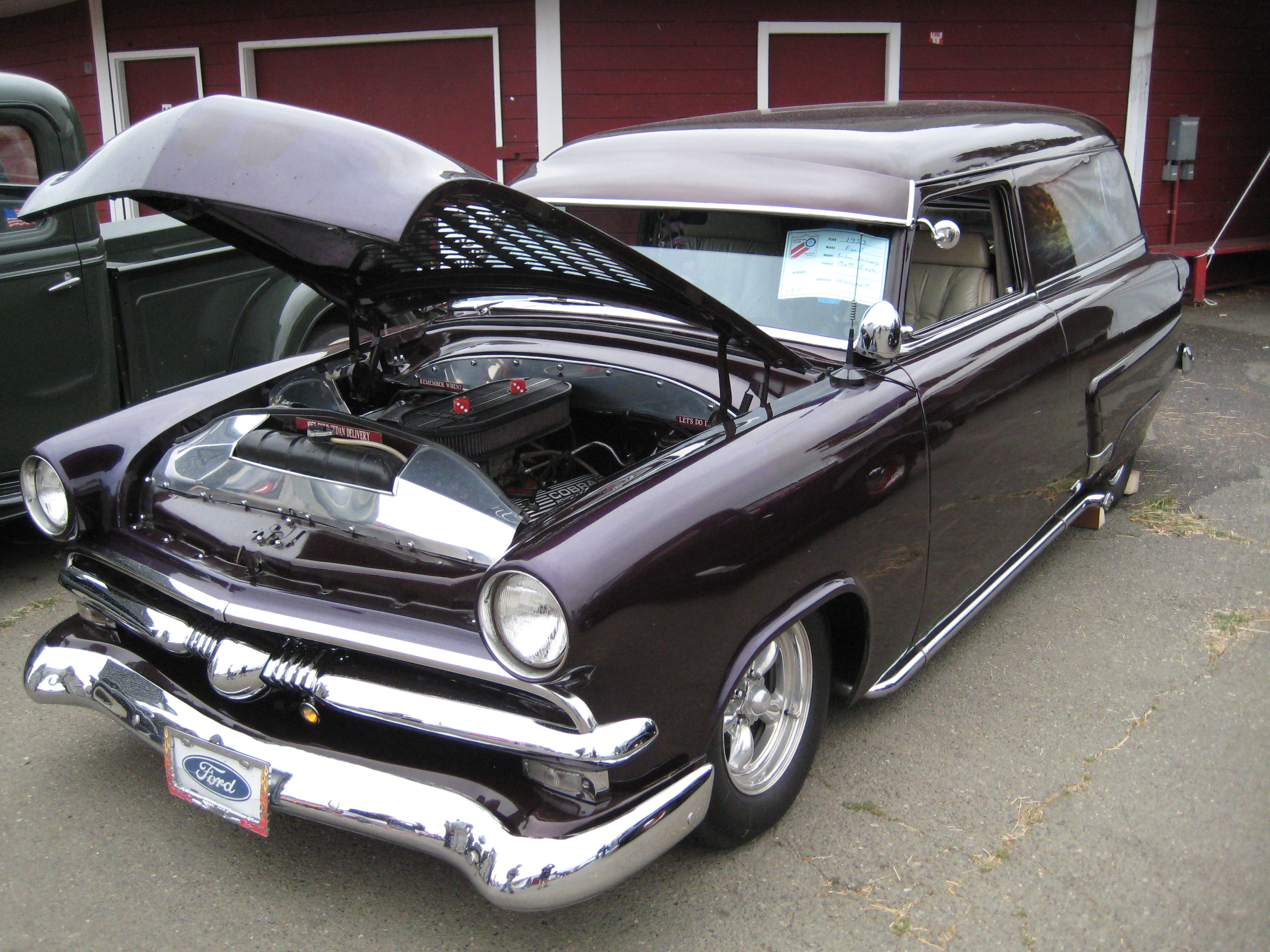
1953 Ford Courier (with after-market wheels)

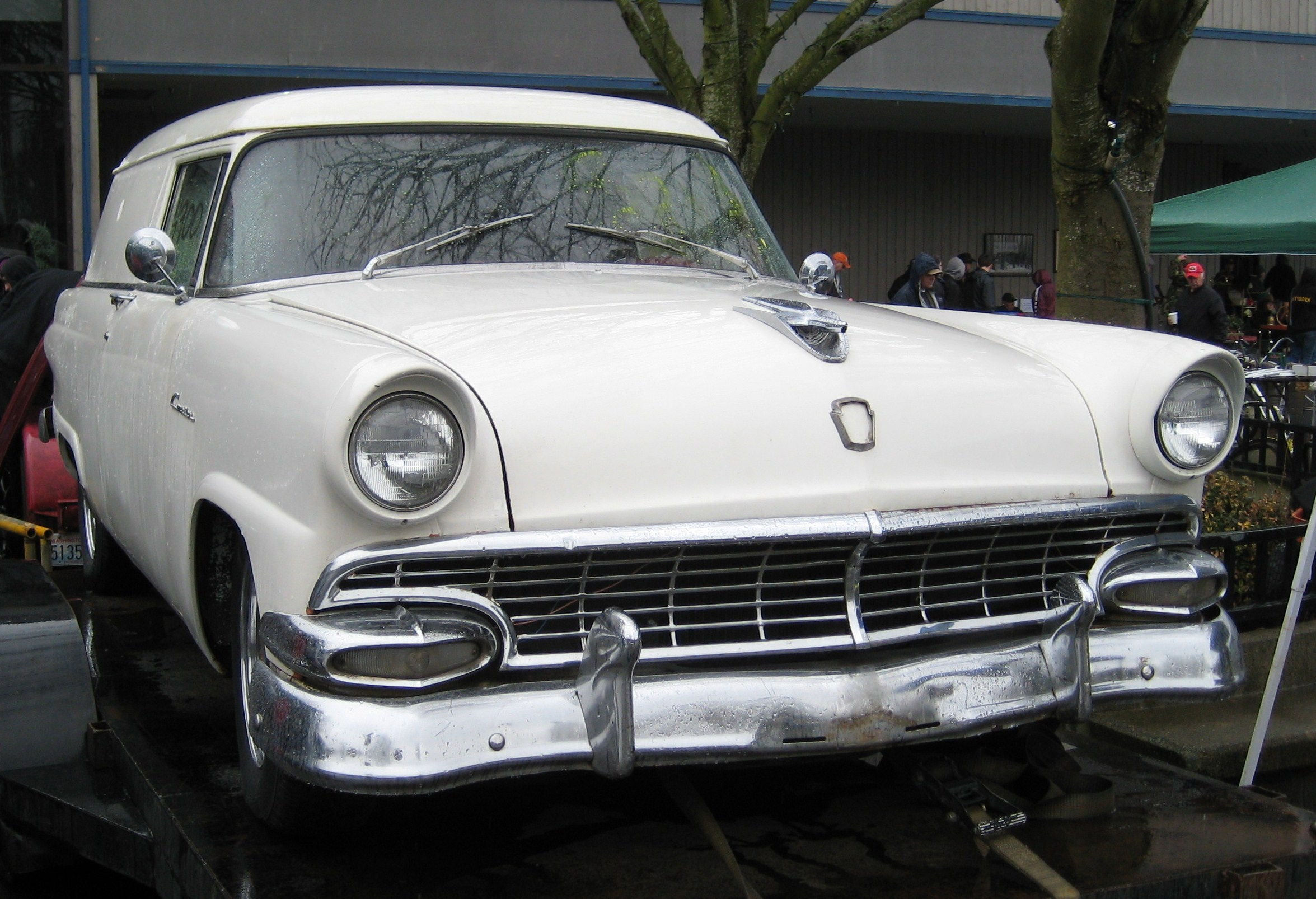
1956 Ford Courier

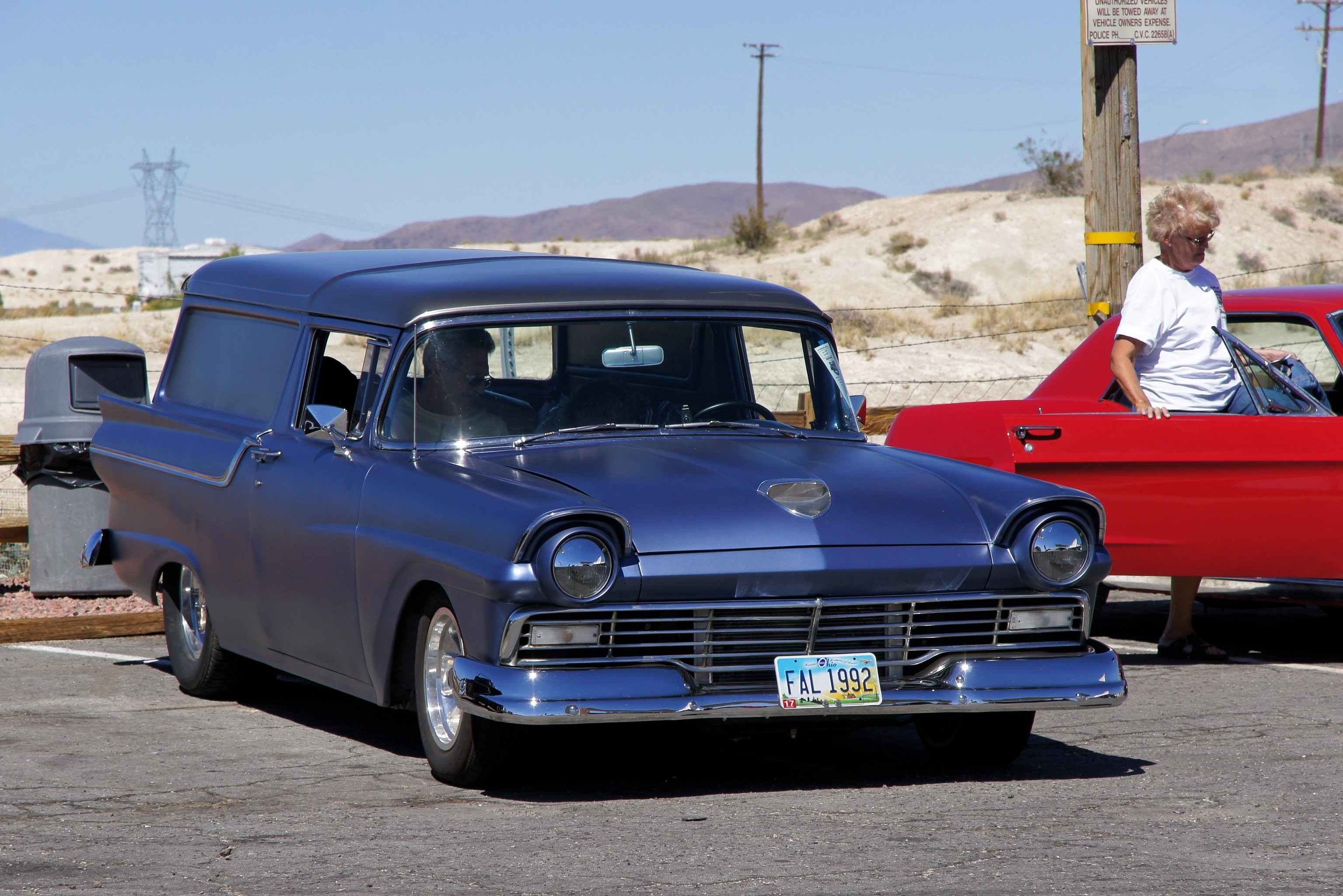
1957 Ford Courier (with after-market wheels)

== Mazda-based models ==
For 1972 production, Ford revived the Courier nameplate after a 12-year hiatus, applying it to its first compact pickup truck, a rebranded version of the Mazda B-Series. Sold worldwide, the model line was the first product marketed jointly between the two manufacturers, launching an alliance that would last through 2020 production.

=== First generation (1972–1976) ===
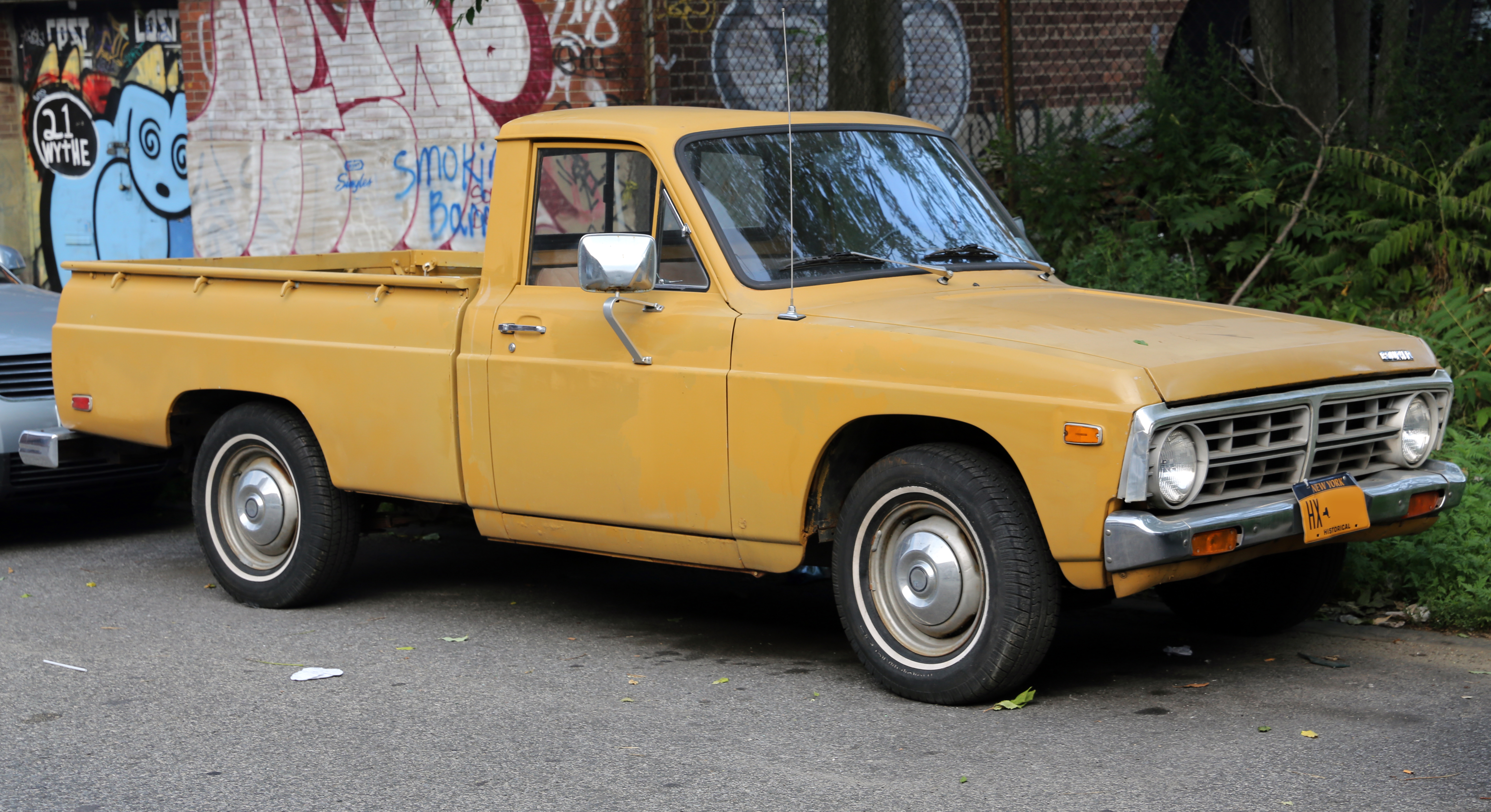
1972 Ford Courier

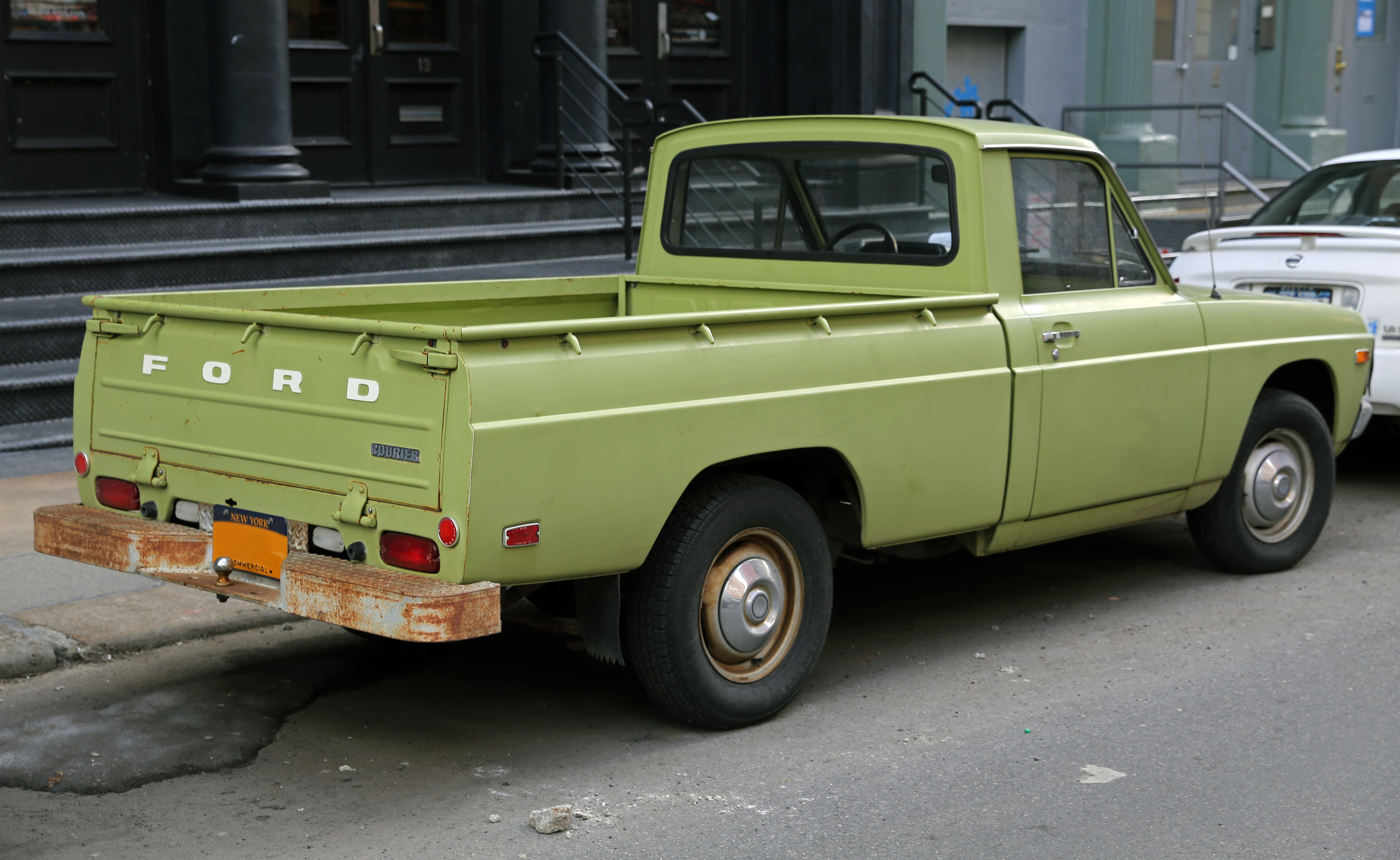
1975 Ford Courier

In the early 1970s, the Ford Courier name was applied to the Mazda B series, a compact pickup manufactured by Mazda. It had greater fuel economy than the full-sized pickups of the time. The Courier was manufactured by Toyo Kogyo (Mazda) and imported to North America and sold by Ford Motor Company as a response to the unforeseen popularity of the small Toyota and Nissan/Datsun Pickups. It occupied the market segment previously held by the Ford Falcon-based Ranchero when that platform was upgraded to the larger Ford Fairlane in 1966.

Like the other minipickups of the time, it featured a small (by US standards) four-cylinder engine, a four-speed manual transmission, rear-wheel drive, an impressive load capability of 1,400 lb (635 kg) considering its size, and a fairly small price tag compared to full-sized pickups of the time. To circumvent the 25% "chicken tax" on light trucks, Couriers (as with Chevrolet LUVs) were imported in "cab chassis" configurations, which included the entire light truck—less the cargo box or truck bed—and were only subject to a 4% tariff. Subsequently, a truck bed was attached to the chassis and the vehicle could be sold as a light truck.

The body styling was effectively that of the related Mazda B-series; however, its front styling was unique in that the grille was designed to emulate the larger Ford F-series, and large single headlights instead of the B-series' smaller twin units.

When the Courier was introduced, it came standard with a 1.8-liter overhead-cam engine, which produced 74 hp (55 kW) at 5,070 rpm, and 92 lb-ft (125 Nm) at 3,500 rpm. A four-speed manual transmission was standard, and a three-speed automatic was optional. A five-speed manual option was introduced for the 1976 model year. Northwest A.T.V. in Kelso, Washington converted around 1500 examples to the 4WD "Courier Sasquatch". The Sasquatch was fitted with a Dana Spicer two-speed transfer case and a solid front axle; they were only sold along the west coast of the United States.

The Courier's badging changed a few times in the first generation. In 1972 and 1973, the tailgate read "COURIER" in large raised letters, with a small "FORD" badge on the upper left. The 1972 model has a small "COURIER" badge on the front driver's side edge of the hood, and from 1973 through 1976, the hood badging read "FORD". From the 1974 model year, the tailgate read "FORD" in large letters, with a small "COURIER" badge on the lower right. In 1976, the cab was lengthened by 3 in (76 mm), and the grille received added trim.

=== Second generation (1977–1985) ===
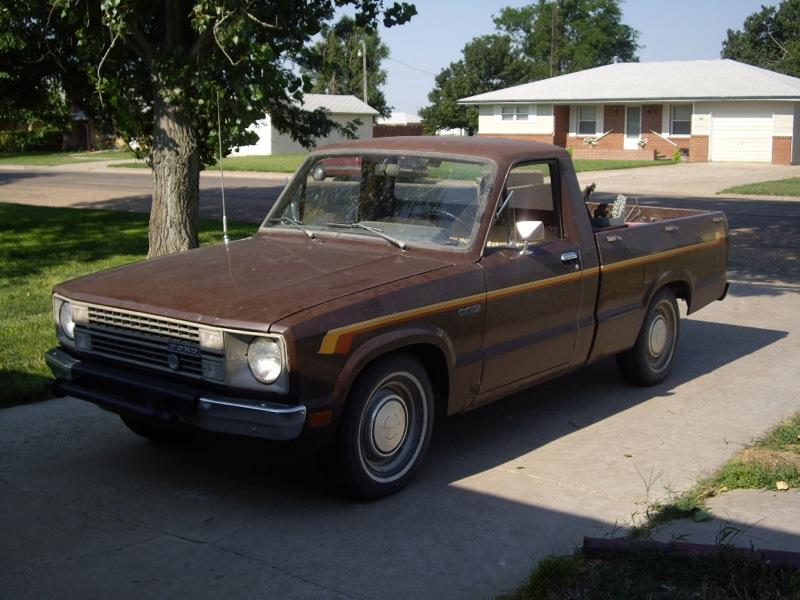
1979 Ford Courier

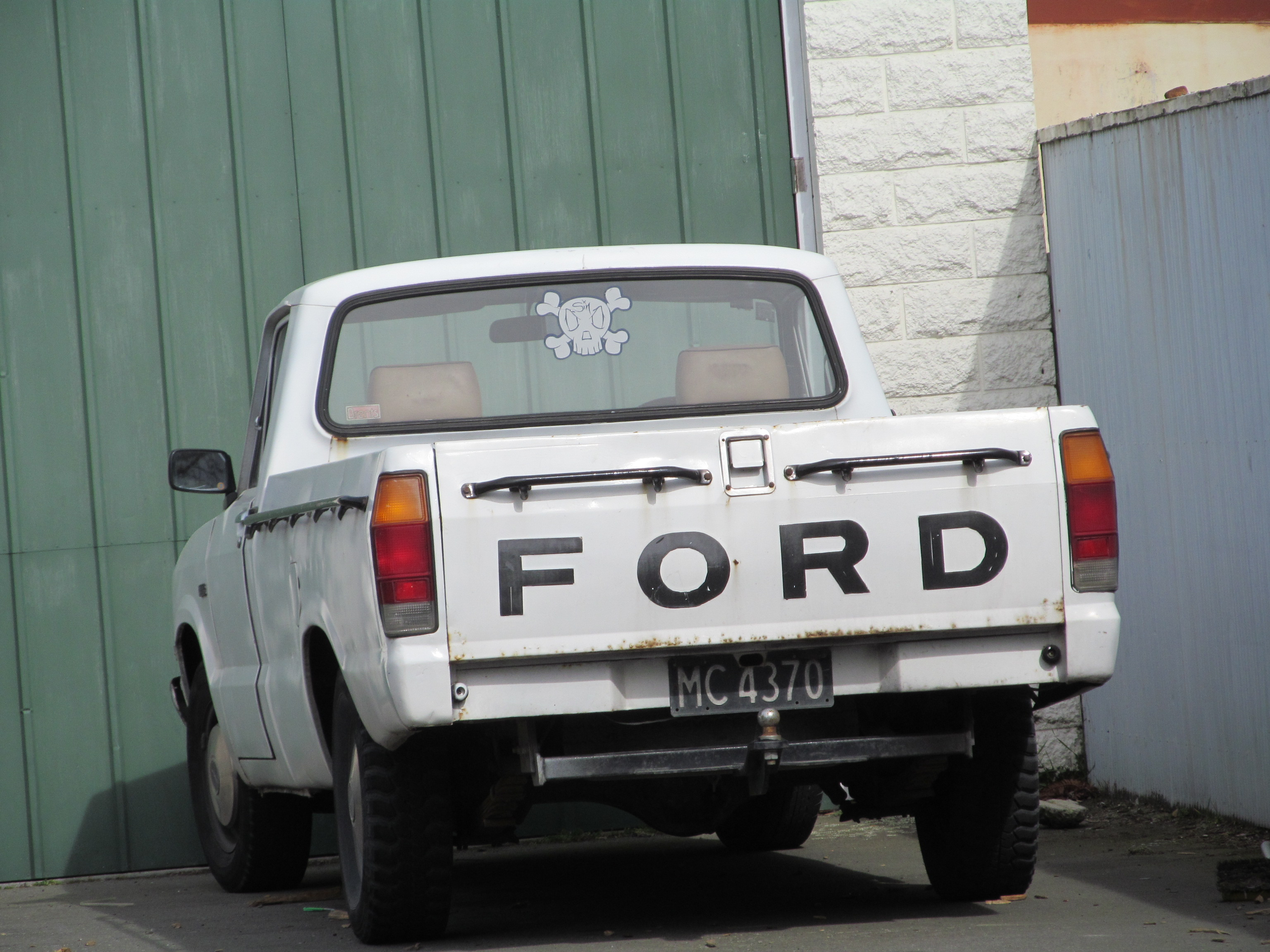
1985 Ford Courier

Beginning in 1977, Ford gave the Courier a fresh look, moving into the more blocky, angular styling that is distinct of 1980s automotive design. The base model engine remained the 1.8 L (1,796 cc) VB engine.

The truck was available with front disc brakes, and a Ford-built 2.3-liter engine option (which was the same as that of the Ford Pinto & Mustang II and Mercury Bobcat & Capri). The key identifying feature of the Courier from the Mazda B-Series was still the singular headlights, although with park and indicator lights placed in the grille starting in '78 ('77s still had the turn signal lights in the bumper). In 1979, the base model was increased in size to 2.0 liter (120.1 CID). The optional Ford 2.3-liter (140 cid) engine was produced in Brazil. The Courier was never available with a diesel engine in the US. However, the 1980 Mazda B2200 was available with the S2, a Mazda license built Perkins 4.135 (four-cylinder, 135-cid) 2.2-liter diesel engine, producing 66 hp (49 kW) at 2,100 rpm. This same diesel engine was available in the 1983 and 1984 Ford Rangers, but it was replaced by the Mitsubishi 4D55T 2.3-liter turbodiesel (also used in Mitsubishi's own Mighty Max and the Dodge Ram 50) for the 1985 to 1987 Ford Rangers.

The Courier continued to be sold in North America until 1982 model year. For 1983, Ford introduced its own Ford Ranger to fill its compact truck segment in the United States and Canada, effectively replacing the Courier. However, in other markets (such as Australia), this generation of Couriers continued on until the 1985 model year, when the next generation was introduced. Australian models received a facelift around 1982/1983.

Between 1979 and 1982, a number of electric Ford Couriers were produced. Jet Industries purchased "vehicle gliders" (Ford Courier bodies minus their engines) and put in a series DC motor and lead-acid batteries to produce the Jet Industries ElectraVan 750. These were sold mainly for use as service trucks, generally to local government departments. They had a top speed of about 70 mph (113 km/h), and would go 50 to 60 miles (97 km) on a full charge. A number of these vehicles still exist, usually with upgraded motor control systems and higher-voltage battery packs.

=== Third generation (1985–1998) ===
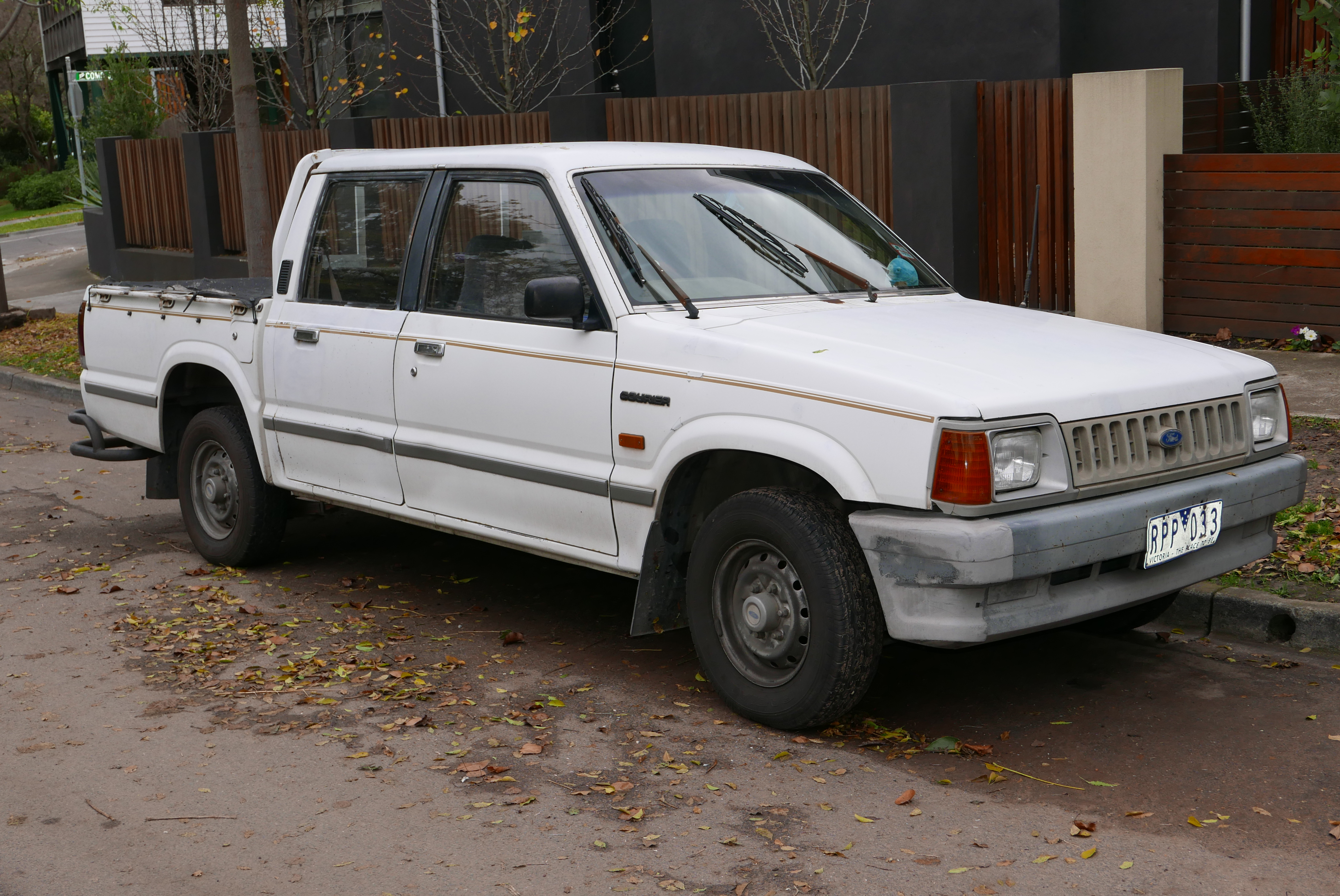
1990 Ford Courier

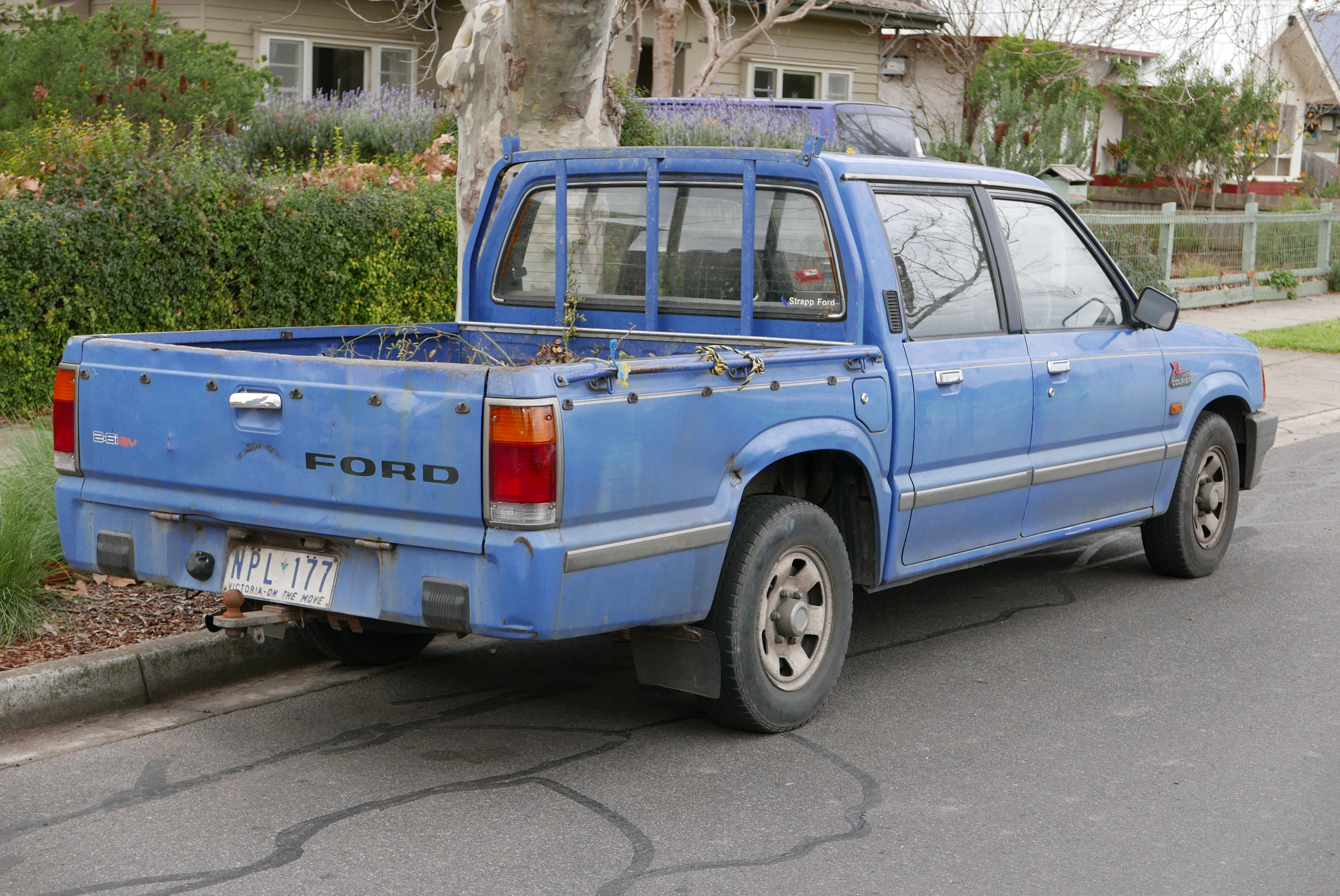
1995 Ford Courier

Coinciding with the 1985 redesign of the Mazda Proceed/B-Series, the Courier was given a larger, more modern cab. New options included five-speed manual transmissions, four-wheel drive, and a V6 engine. For the first time, extended and four-door cabs were available.

In a similar fashion to the North American Ford Ranger becoming the donor platform for the Ford Explorer SUV, a sport utility would be based upon this version of the Courier. Branded the Ford Raider (and equivalent Mazda Proceed Marvie), it was sold from 1991 to 1997.

=== Fourth generation (1998–2007) ===
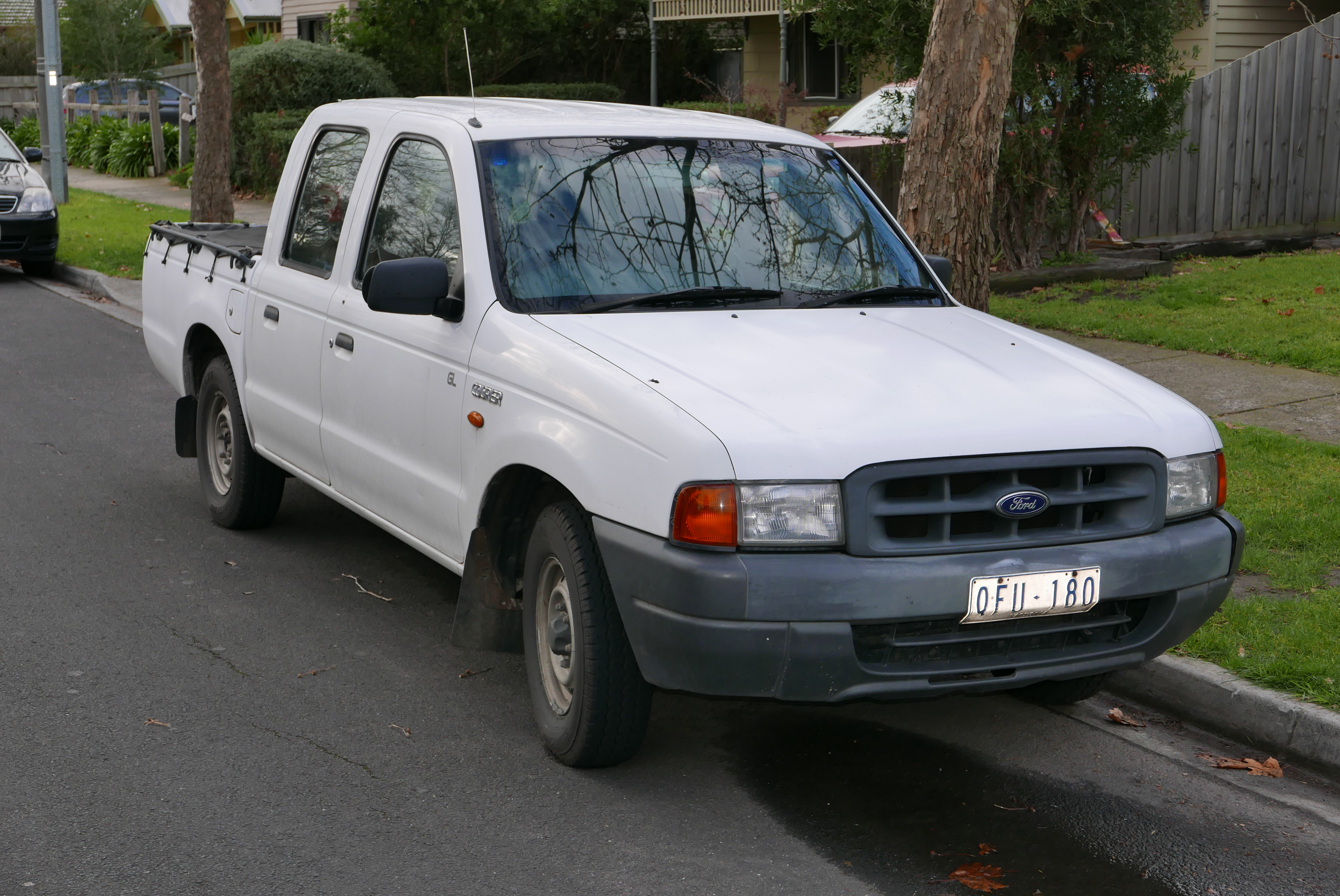
2000 Ford Courier

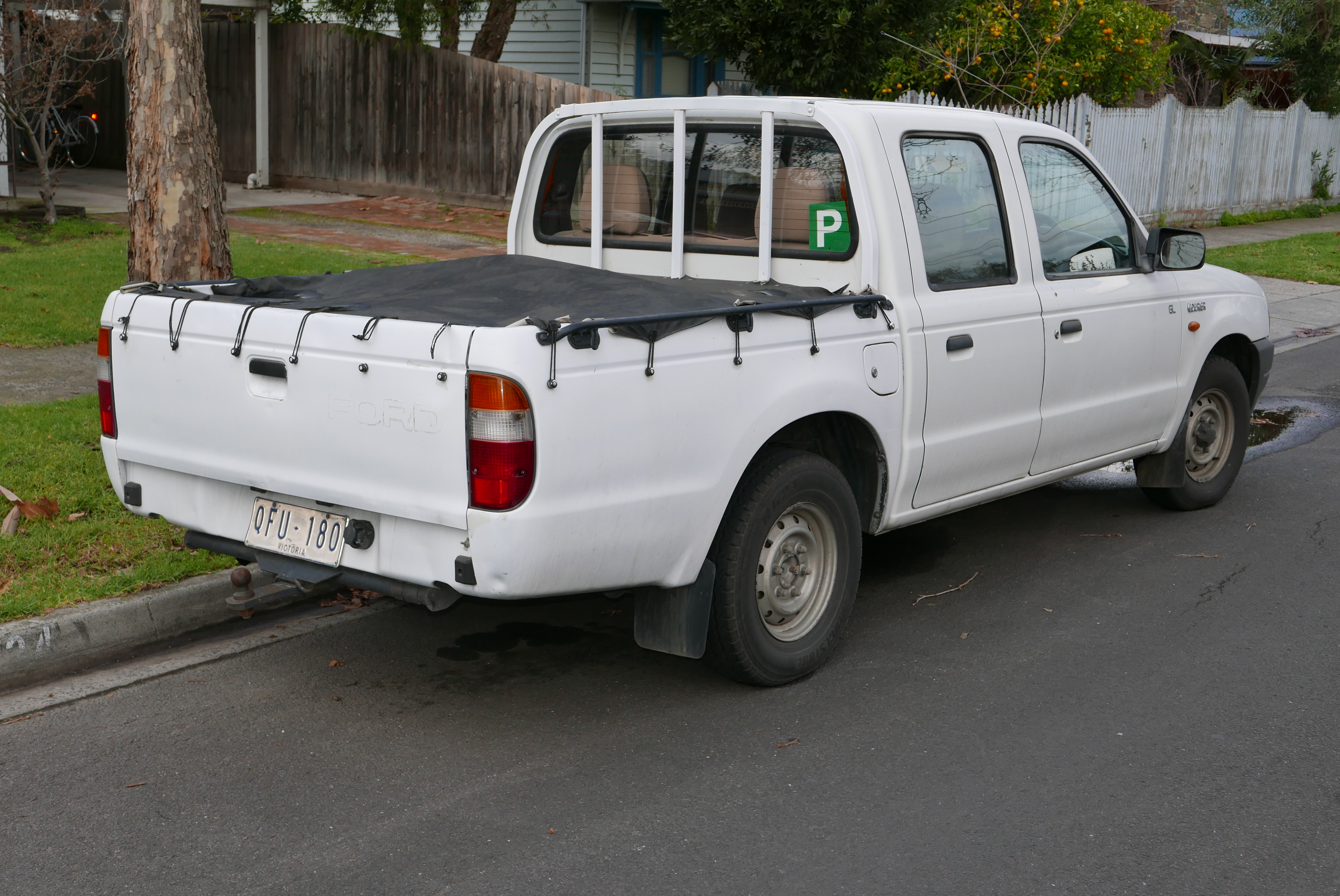
2000 Ford Courier

In 1998, Mazda released a complete redesign of the B-Series, with Ford adopting the Ranger nameplate for both Mazda-produced and Ford-produced compact trucks. This Ranger was sold worldwide, with the exception of North America (and certain Latin American markets).

Ford Australia continued the use of the Ford Courier nameplate, selling it through 2006 in Australia and New Zealand.

== Fiesta-based models ==
=== Europe (1991–2002) ===
A Ford Courier B-segment car-derived van was launched in Europe in June 1991 with a front-engine, front-wheel-drive layout and 1.3-litre OHV petrol or 1.8-litre OHC Diesel power. Based on the Ford BE-2 platform also used by the Mark III and Mark IV Fiesta, Mark I Ka and Puma (sport compact) cars, the Ford Courier van was initially based on the Mark III Fiesta that had been introduced two years earlier in 1989, but with a longer wheelbase and Renault-derived torsion bar rear suspension.

From August 1995, the Courier van was instead produced in a Mark IV-based version and did receive that Fiesta's facelift in 1999, meaning that it was produced with three different front ends, all with similar rear ends using the 1986–2000 Transit rear lights. As well as the two-seat cargo version, there was also a glazed version produced with rear seats fitted; this five-seat passenger model was sold as the Courier Kombi.

The Courier van was built in the Dagenham, England and Cologne, Germany factories and is 4,115 mm long, 1,650 mm wide and 1,835 mm tall, with a curb weight of 1,700 kg. With a capacity of 590 kg, competing products were initially the Fiat Fiorino and the Renault Express, and all units received a five-speed manual gearbox.

In France, the Ford Courier was called Ford Courrier (with two "r"s), likely because "Courier" looked like the French word "Courrier" (mail) was misspelled.

The 60 PS (44 kW) 1.8-litre naturally aspirated Diesel engine achieves its maximum power at 4,800 rpm, and its maximum torque is 110 Nm at 2,500 rpm. The claimed top speed of the Courier van 1.8D is 84 mph (135 km/h), with acceleration not specified.

From 1999 to 2002, a 1.8-litre turbo-diesel engine was available as an option for improved performance. However, the 1.8TD was only offered in 75 PS low-boost guise; the 90 PS intercooled version (as offered on the Mark VI Escort van) was not made available on the Courier van.

Production of the Courier van ended in August 2002, and both it and the Escort van were replaced in September 2002 by the Ford Transit Connect, based on the Focus. However, after 11 years of no direct replacement, a van based on the Fiesta bearing the Transit Courier/Tourneo Courier name was revealed in Yeniköy, Turkey, in 2013 under Ford Otosan (Koc-Ford Motor Company Joint Venture).

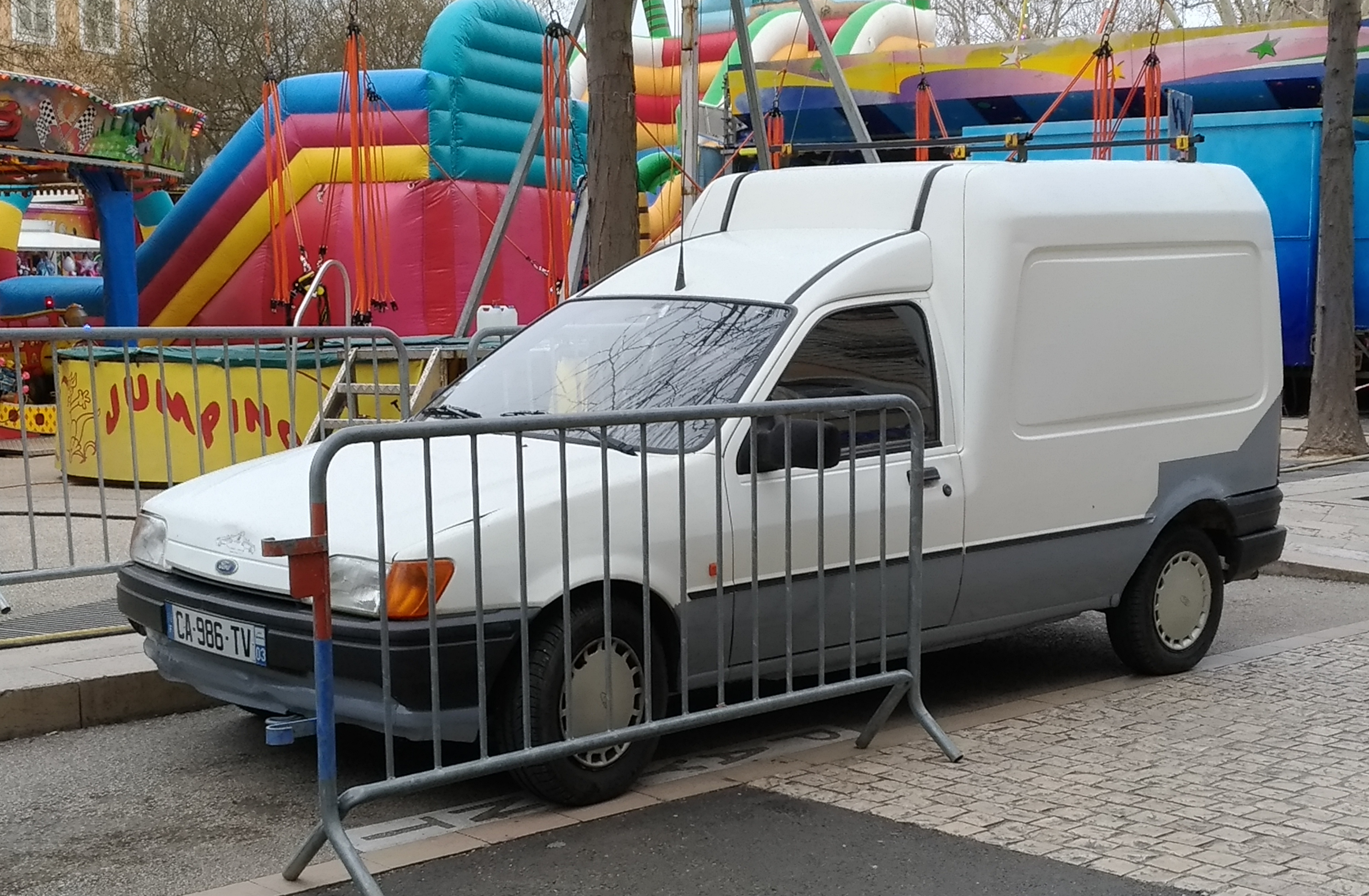
1993 Ford Courrier van (French version)

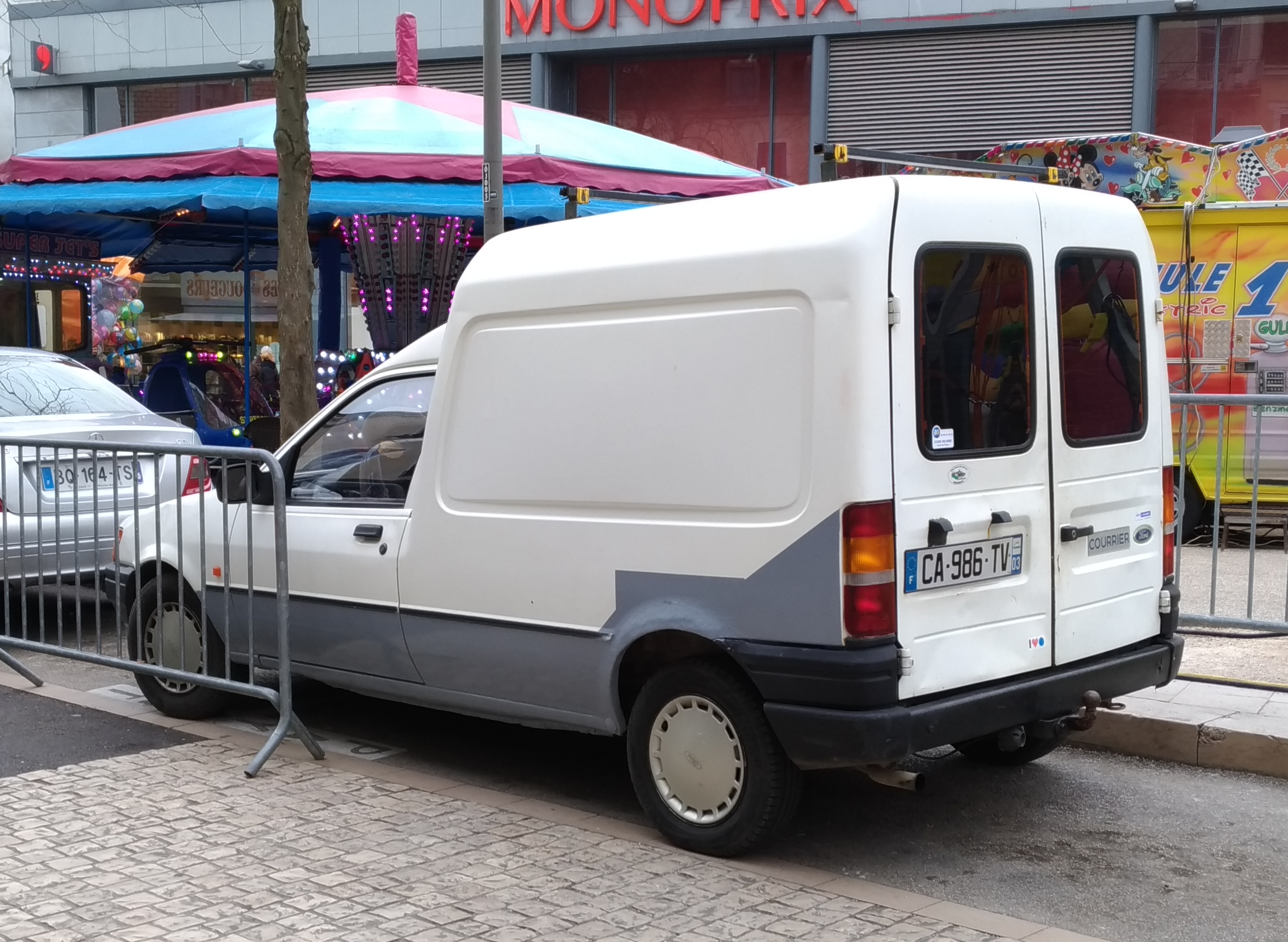
1993 Ford Courrier van (French version) rear

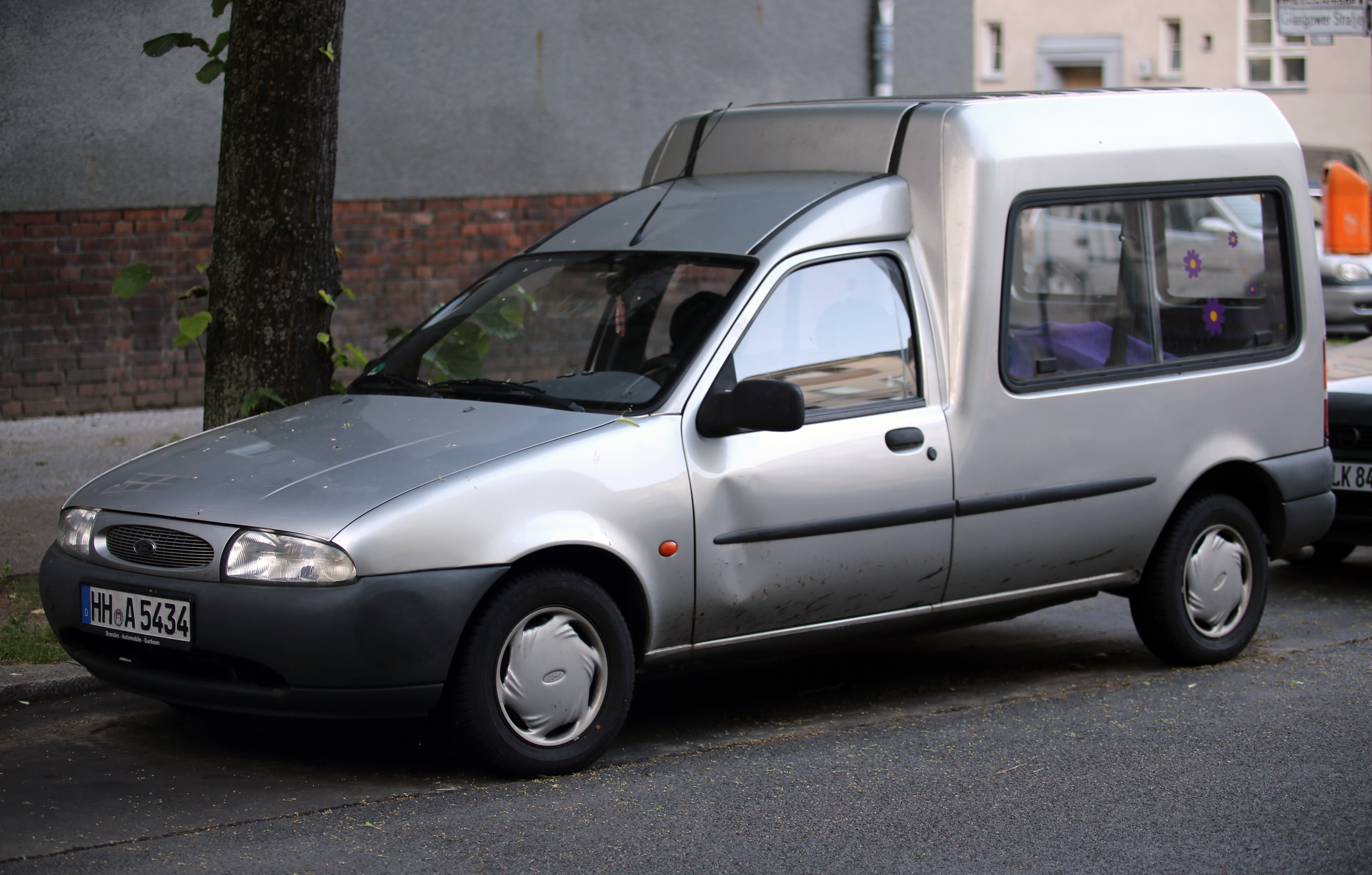
1996–1999 Ford Courier Combi (Europe)

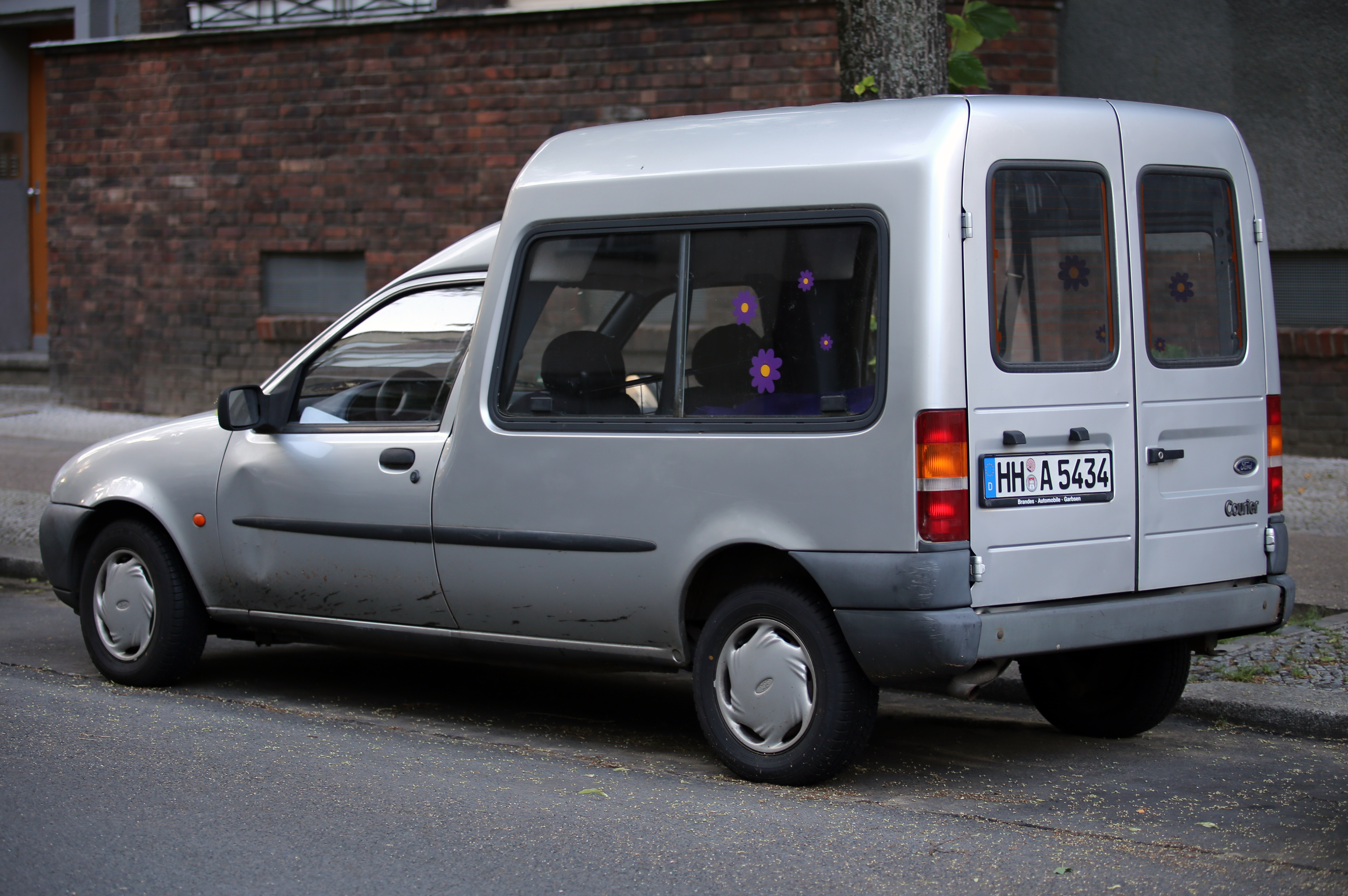
1996–1999 Ford Courier Combi (Europe) rear

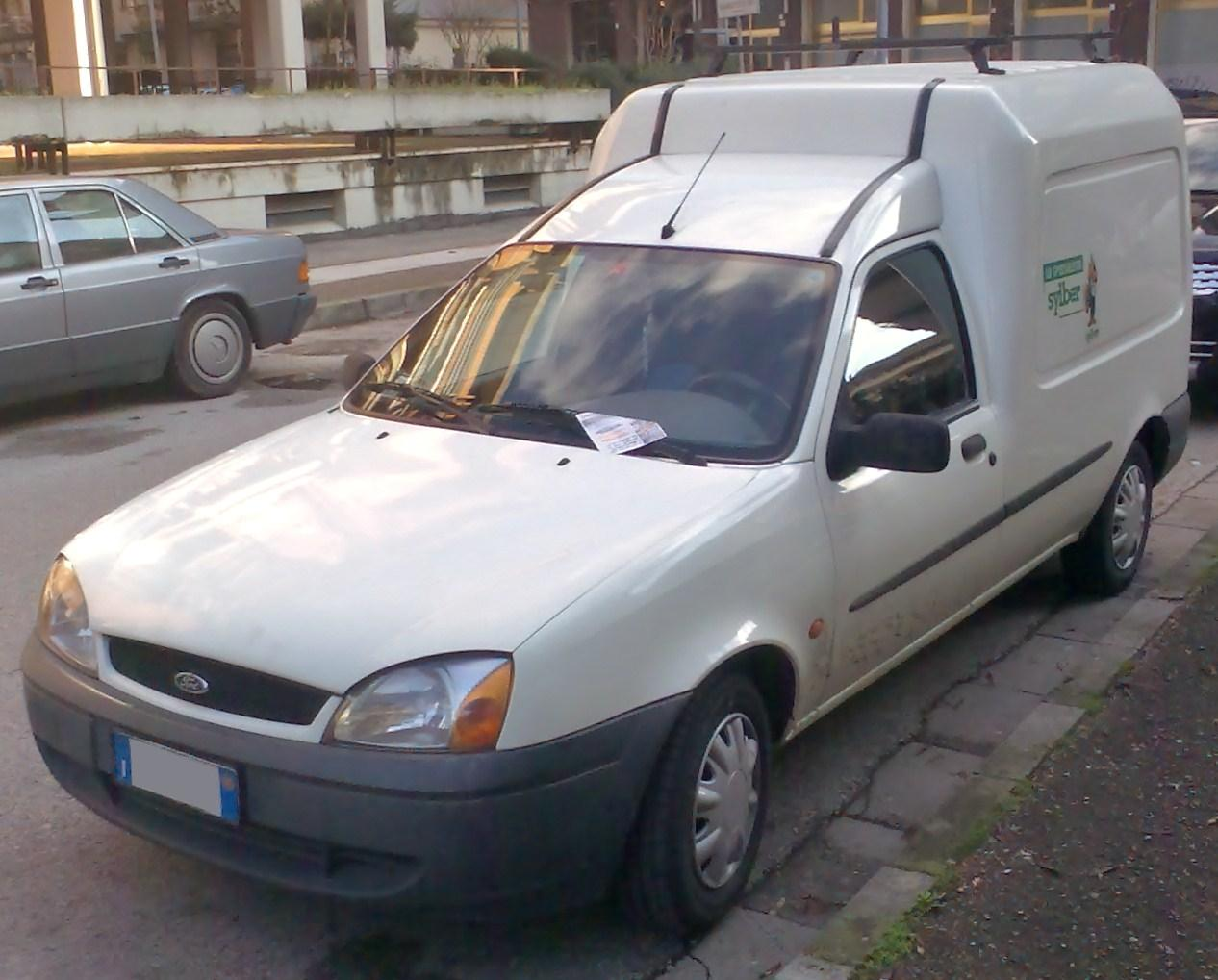
2000 Ford Courier van (Europe)

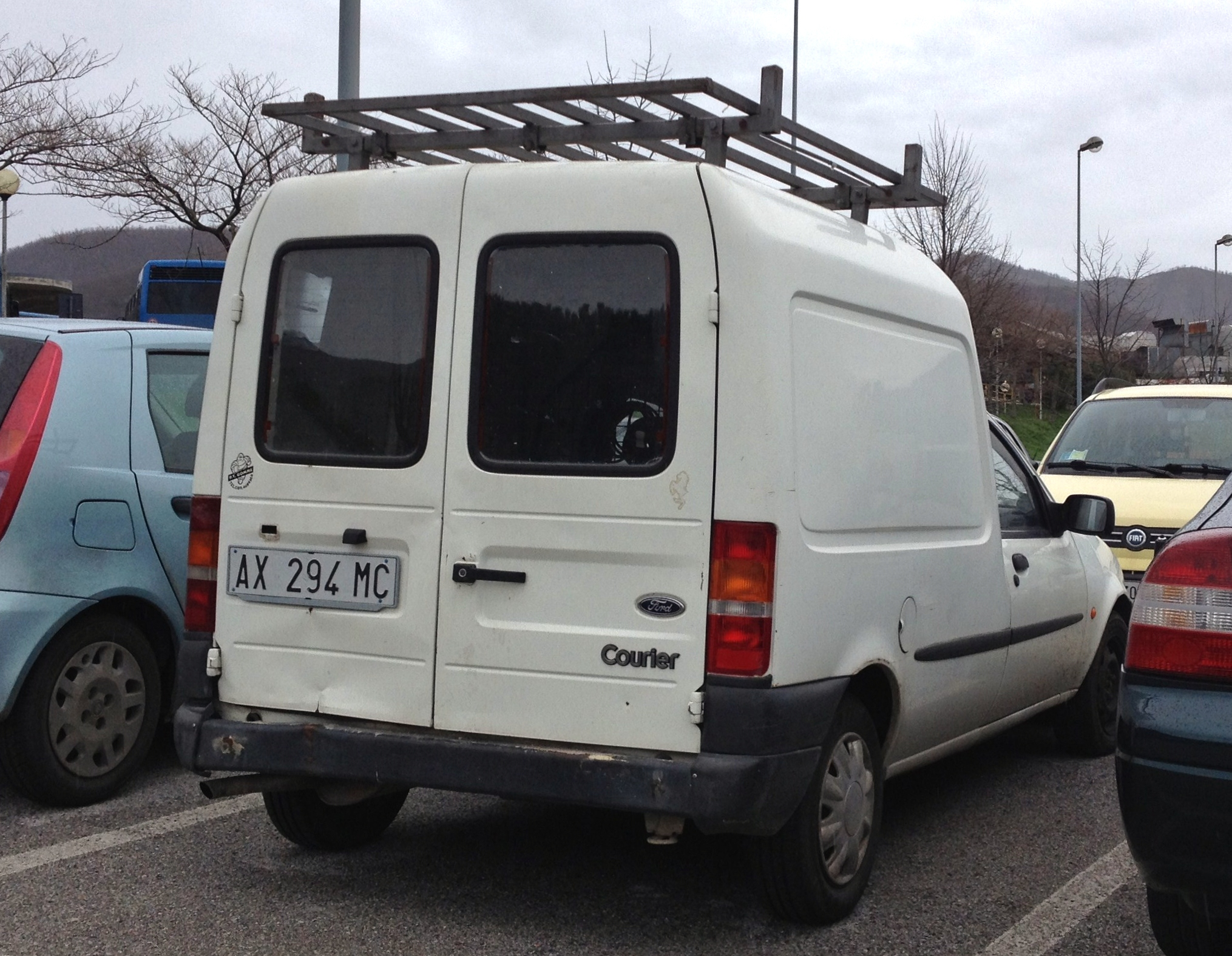
1995–2002 Ford Courier van (Europe) rear

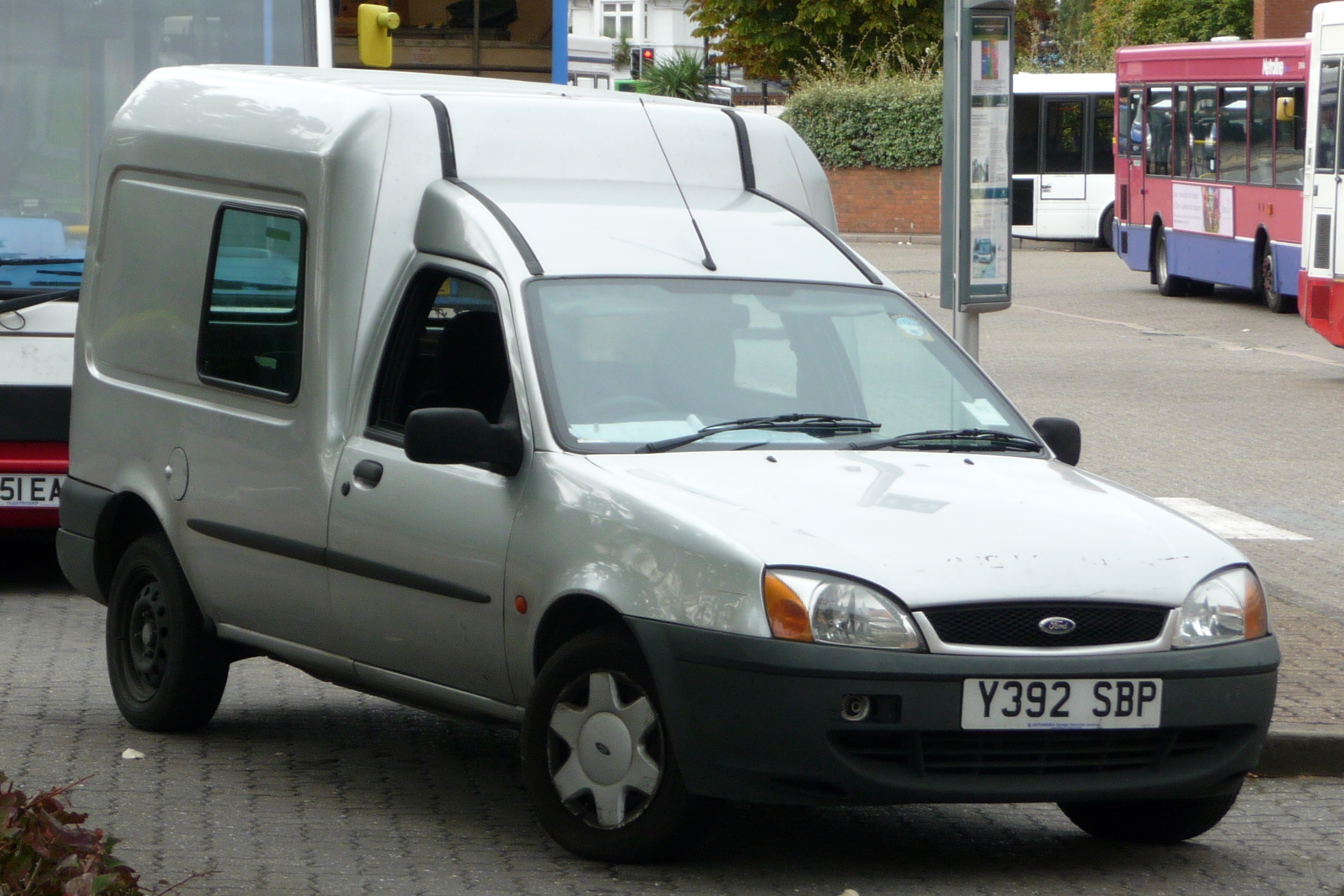
2001 Ford Courier van (UK version)

=== Brazil (1998–2013) ===
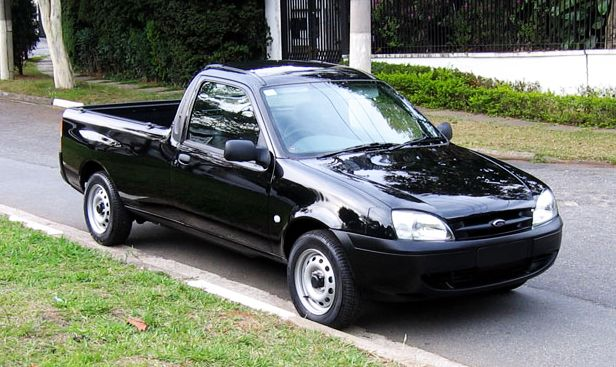
Brazilian Ford Courier pickup

The name was also applied to a small coupe utility of similar layout produced by Ford in Brazil and exported to countries such as Mexico. It is based on the 1998 model of the Ford Fiesta. While its front treatment is the same as the South African-built Fiesta-based Ford Bantam "bakkie" coupe utility, it has a completely different load box. The South African version had the short doors of the five-door hatchback and small quarter lights in the style of larger extended cab pickups, and the Brazilian version had the three-door's longer doors and no quarter windows.

Its load capacity is 700 kg (1,543 lb). Until 1999, the Courier used the Endura 1.3-liter engine and the Zetec-SE 1.4-l 16v engine. The Mk IV 1.4 16v Zetec-SE has a top speed of 170 km/h (106 mph) and can accelerate from 0–100 km/h (0–62 mph) in 12 seconds. Since 2000, both engines were replaced by the Zetec Rocam 1.6-liter. The Mk V 1.6 model has top speed of 180 km/h (112 mph) and can accelerate from 0–100 km/h in 10 seconds.

Its dimensions are 2,830 mm (111.4 in) wheelbase, 4,457 mm (175.5 in) length, 1,793 mm (70.6 in) width and 1,477 mm (58.1 in) height.

Ford announced in January 2002 that it is going to transfer the entire production of the Courier pickup to the factory in São Bernardo do Campo, in the ABC region of São Paulo, starting in May 2002. Production of the pickup truck is currently divided between the São Bernardo do Campo plant in the state of São Paulo and the Camaçari plant in Bahia state. The transfer agreement was signed on January 22, 2002 with workers representatives.

From 2013, the plant in São Bernardo do Campo in Brazil has suspended the manufacturing model for ordinary consumers and business, but Ford has not confirmed that the model was taken from line definitely. Despite Ford not confirming that the Courier was taken from line definitely, the Courier had seemed to end production and was possibly replaced by the Ford Ranger (T6). In Mexico, it stopped being sold after 2010.

== Sales ==
Year	Brazil
2002	7,306
2003	6,373
2004	7,044
2005	7,004
2006	8,668
2007	9,563
2008	8,333
2009	8,261
2010	7,309
2011	7,706
2012	7,264
2013	3,053
