= Mazda Grand Familia =

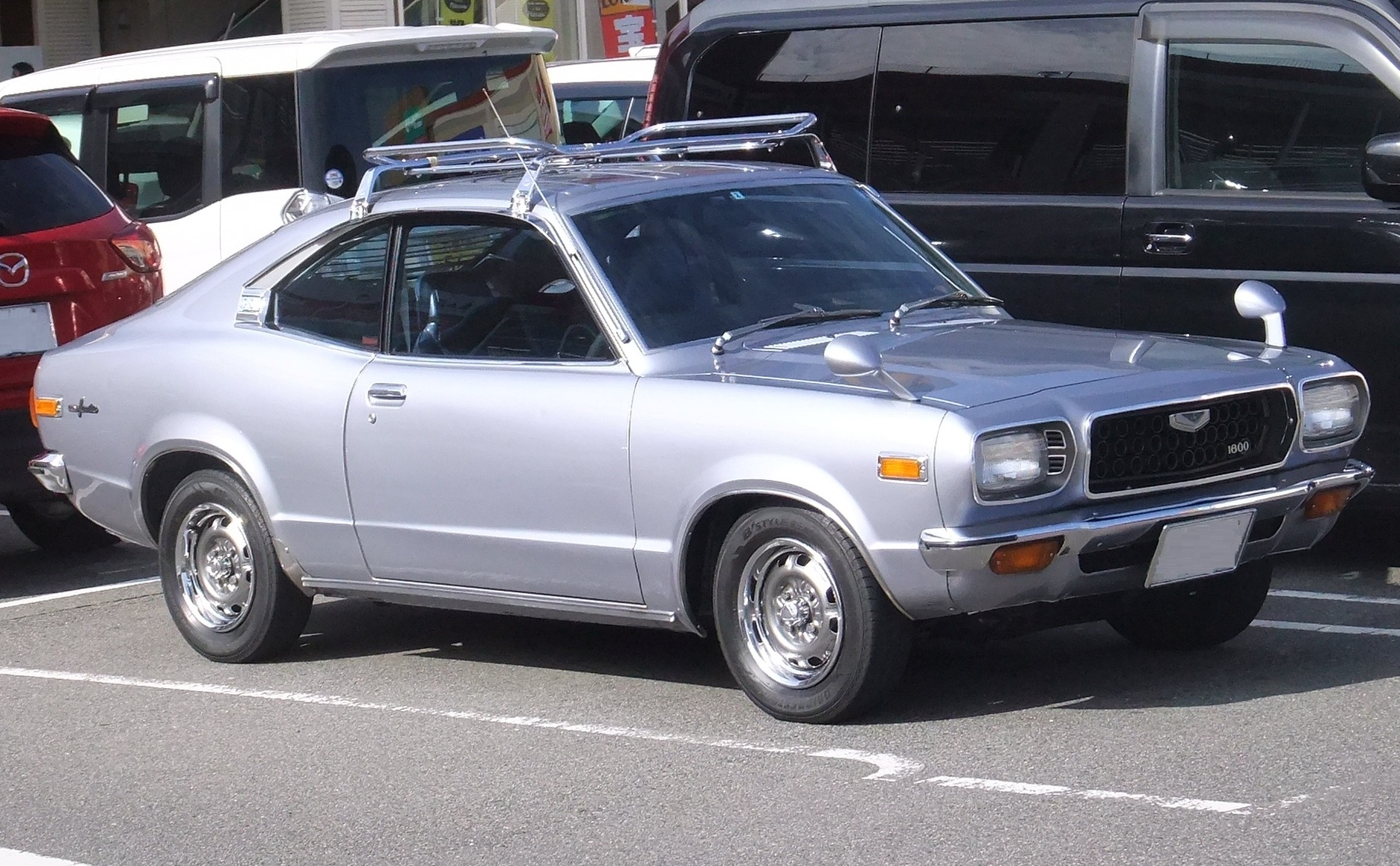
- Mazda Grand Familia Coupé

Overview
- Manufacturer: Mazda
- Also called: Mazda 808; Mazda 818; Mazda Mizer; Mazda RX-3; Mazda Savanna; Kia Brisa II; Kia K303
- Production: 1971–1978
- Assembly: Japan: Hiroshima Assembly, Hiroshima; South Korea: Hwaseong (Kia Motors)

Body and chassis
- Body style: 2-door coupé 4-door sedan 5-door station wagon
- Layout: Front-engine, rear-wheel-drive
- Related: Mazda Familia

Powertrain
- Engine: 1272 cc TC I4 (STC/ST3AV); 1272 cc TC LPG I4 (Kia Brisa II/K303 Taxi); 1490 cc UB I4 (SU4); 1586 cc NA I4 (SN4); 982 cc 10A-0866 Wankel; 1146 cc 12A Wankel; 1146 cc 12B Wankel

Dimensions
- Wheelbase: 2,310 mm (90.9 in)
- Length: 4,075 mm (160.4 in)
- Width: 1,595 mm (62.8 in)
- Height: 1,375 mm (54.1 in)
- Curb weight: 930 kg (2,050 lb)

Chronology
- Predecessor: Mazda R100 (Savanna/RX-3)
- Successor: Mazda RX-7 (Savanna/RX-3)

The Mazda Grand Familia (Japanese: マツダ・グランドファミリア, Matsuda Gurando Famiria) is an automobile which was produced by Mazda in Japan from 1971 to 1978. It was sold as the Mazda 808 in some export markets including Asia, Australia, and New Zealand, and as the Mazda 818 in many others - this was mostly due to Peugeot having trademarked three-digit numbers with a middle zero in many markets. The body style configurations offered were a two-door coupé, a four-door sedan, and a five-door station wagon. The Grand Familia offered only inline four cylinder engines. The largely identical rotary-powered versions were marketed as the Mazda Savanna (マツダ・サバンナ, Matsuda Sabanna) in Japan, with export markets taking this model as the Mazda RX-3.

The Grand Familia/Savanna were originally intended to replace the smaller Mazda Familia to better compete with the Toyota Corolla, Nissan Sunny, and Mitsubishi Colt. With the onset of the 1970s energy crisis however, the Familia sold better due to its fuel economy. Since Mazda had already developed the Grand Familia/Savanna, it was sold globally as a somewhat larger, more upscale alternative to the Familia/1000/1300 and in North America it was Mazda's smallest offering.

== Standard engine ==
=== Japan ===
The Grand Familia was available in coupé, sedan, and station wagon forms. Engines were inline four-cylinder units and included a 1,272 cc and a 1,490 cc option, called the "Grand Familia S" in Japan. The 1.5 was replaced by a larger 1.6-liter four-cylinder in November 1973, an engine which had by then already been used in some export markets (like the United States) for over two years. In the Japanese market, myriad equipment levels were available, ranging from the very basic 1300 Standard to the most luxurious 1500 GL II ("GF II" for the coupé). Originally, only a four-speed manual transmission was available.

Later desmogged versions were sold as the "Grand Familia AP", with AP standing for "Anti Pollution". Power outputs for these models were considerably lower.

Engines (Japan):

- September 1971–February 1976 – 1.3 L (1272 cc) TC I4, 2-barrel, 87 PS (64 kW; 86 hp) at 6000 rpm, 11.0 kg⋅m (108 N⋅m; 80 lbf⋅ft) at 3500 rpm
- February 1976–October 1978 – 1300 AP: 72 PS (53 kW) at 5700 rpm, 10.5 kg⋅m (103 N⋅m; 76 lbf⋅ft) at 3500 rpm
- February 1972–October 1973 – 1.5 L (1490 cc) UB I4, 92 PS (68 kW; 91 hp) at 5800 rpm, 13.2 kg·m (129 N·m) at 4000 rpm
- October 1973–September 1975 – 1.6 L (1586 cc) NA I4, 100 PS (74 kW; 99 hp), 14.0 kg·m (137 N·m)
- September 1975–October 1978 – 1500 AP: 90 PS (66 kW; 89 hp) at 6000 rpm, 13.0 kg⋅m (127 N⋅m; 94 lbf⋅ft) at 3500 rpm

=== Europe ===
When first introduced, European buyers were offered the 1.6-litre engine with 75 PS (55 kW; 74 hp). Because of Peugeot's trademark issues with any model numbers with a central zero, European distributors sold the car as the Mazda 818. For 1976, the new 1.3-liter engine became standard fitment, offering 60 PS (44 kW; 59 hp). The 1.6 remained available but in several markets it was discontinued in later years, as the now somewhat dated 818 was more and more sold on price.

=== North America ===
The Mazda 808 was sold in the U.S. from 1972 through 1977. This name was given only to the 1.6 L version of the Grand Familia. The 808 cost $2,997, which was some $200 above the Honda Civic and Toyota Corolla. It was originally only available with two-door coupé bodywork. The car came with a four-speed manual or three-speed automatic transmission (available through 1974). Early models used the same four-headlight nose as the rotary model. For 1975, power dropped as emissions rules became stricter, but the range was expanded to include the four-door sedan and five-door station wagon models. Mazda was still a small player in the United States and noted in their catalog that not all models were available in every state.

Engine:

- 1972–1974 – 1.6 L (1586 cc) NA I4, single-barrel, 70 hp (52 kW) and 82 lb⋅ft (111 N⋅m)
- 1975–1977 – 1.6 L (1586 cc) NA I4, single-barrel, 64 hp (48 kW) at 5000 rpm and 78 lb⋅ft (106 N⋅m) at 3000 rpm

For 1976 and 1977, the 1.3 L version was sold as the "Mazda Mizer" in the United States with all three types of bodywork. Engine: 1976–1977 – 1.3 L (1272 cc) TC I4, twin-barrel, 48 hp (36 kW) and 67 lb⋅ft (91 N⋅m)

=== South Korea (Kia Brisa II/K303) ===
From October 1975 the Grand Familia was built in South Korea by Kia Motors, with the 1272 cc 72 PS (53 kW) engine and four-door bodywork. Originally it was sold as the Brisa II, alongside the smaller Brisa, based on the Familia Presto. The early cars had rectangular lights, but in December 1976 an updated version with single round headlights was introduced, called the Kia K303. A version for taxi use, powered by LPG, was also available.

A station wagon model of the K303 was added in 1978. Production ended in 1981, when the license expired. As part of a nationwide industrial plan Kia was then excluded from building passenger cars until 1986.

The Brisa II and K-303 are exceedingly rare today (as are classic cars generally in South Korea). As of 2019, there was a single such car registered in the entire country.

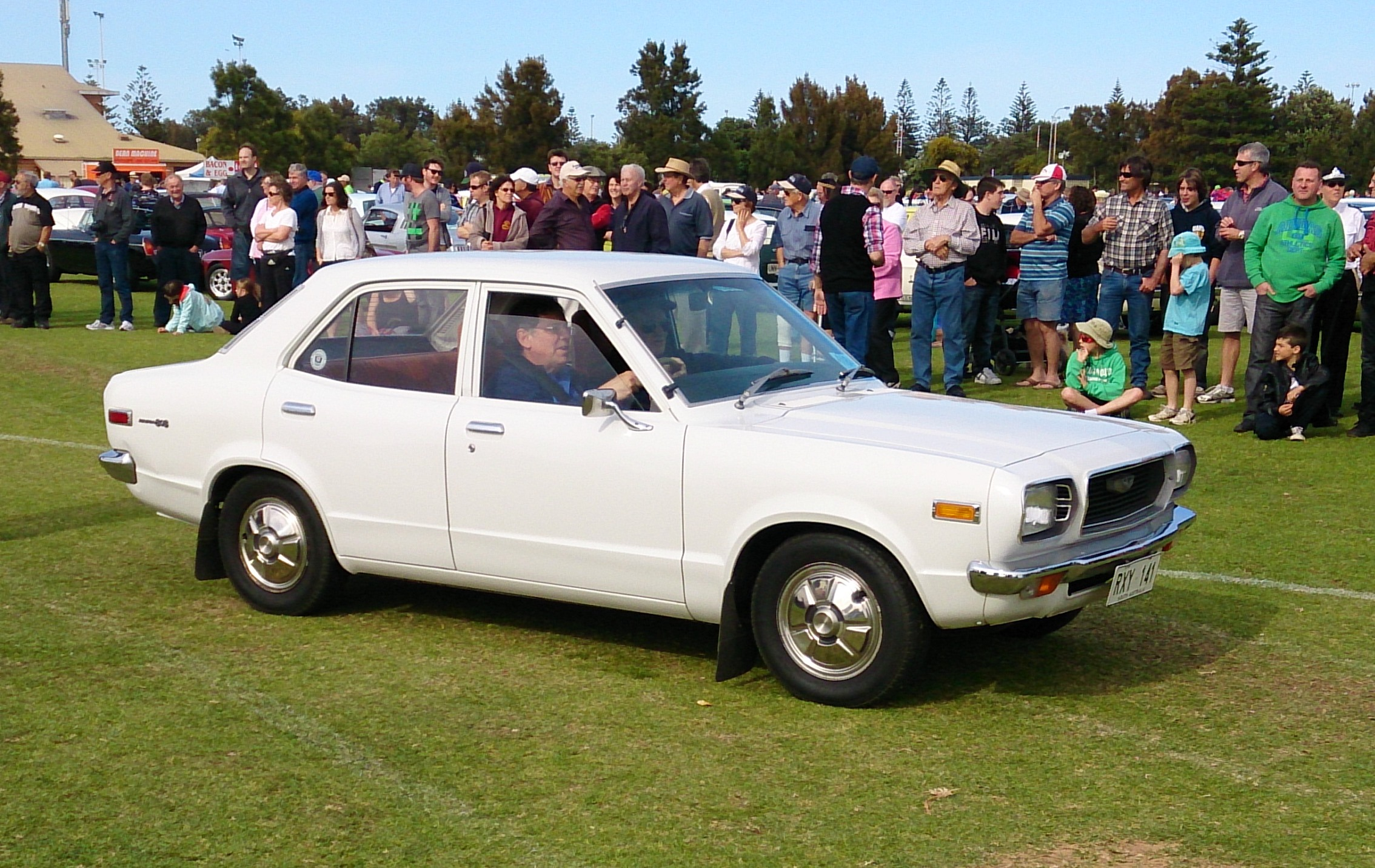
Mazda 808 sedan (Australia)

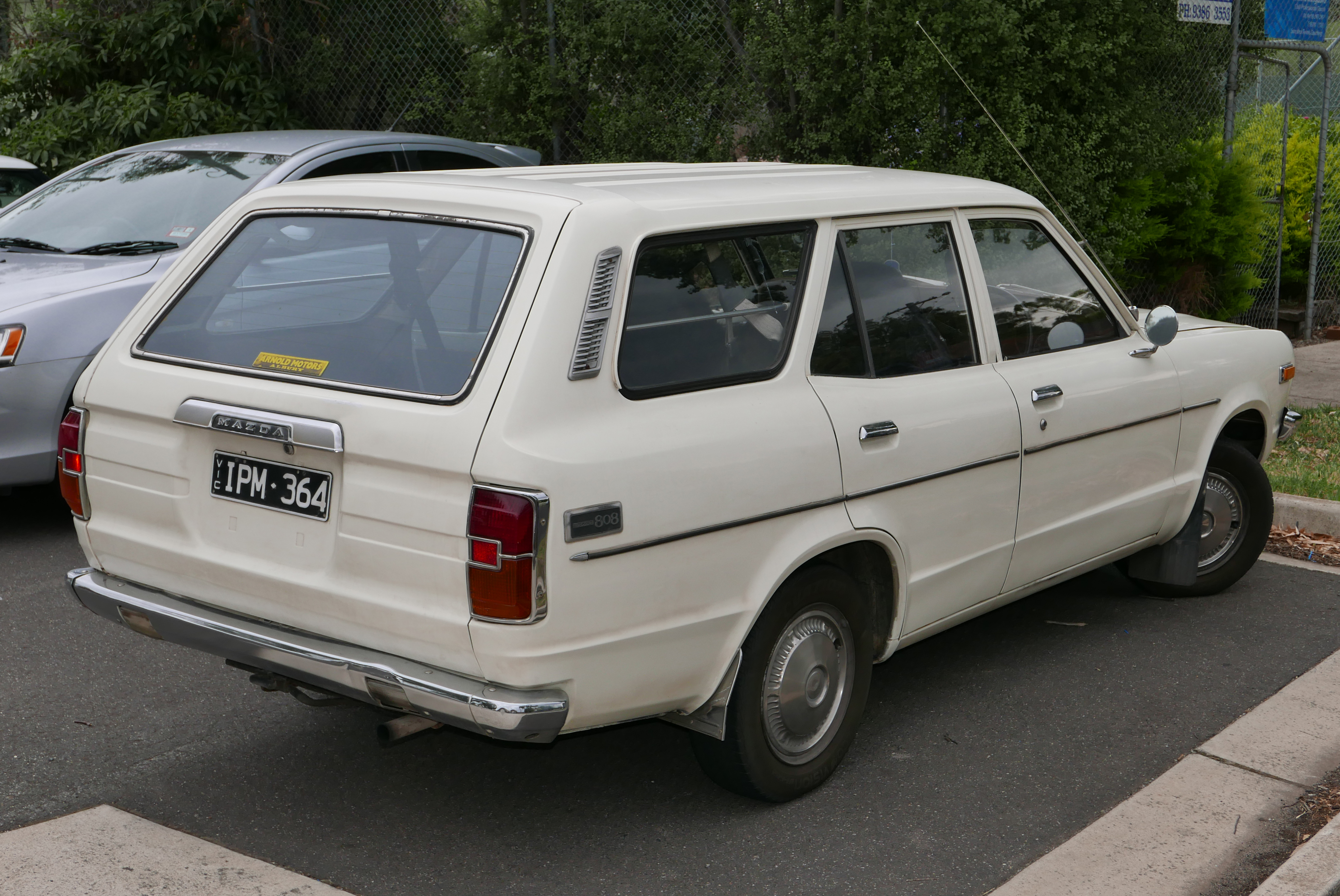
Mazda 808 wagon (Australia)

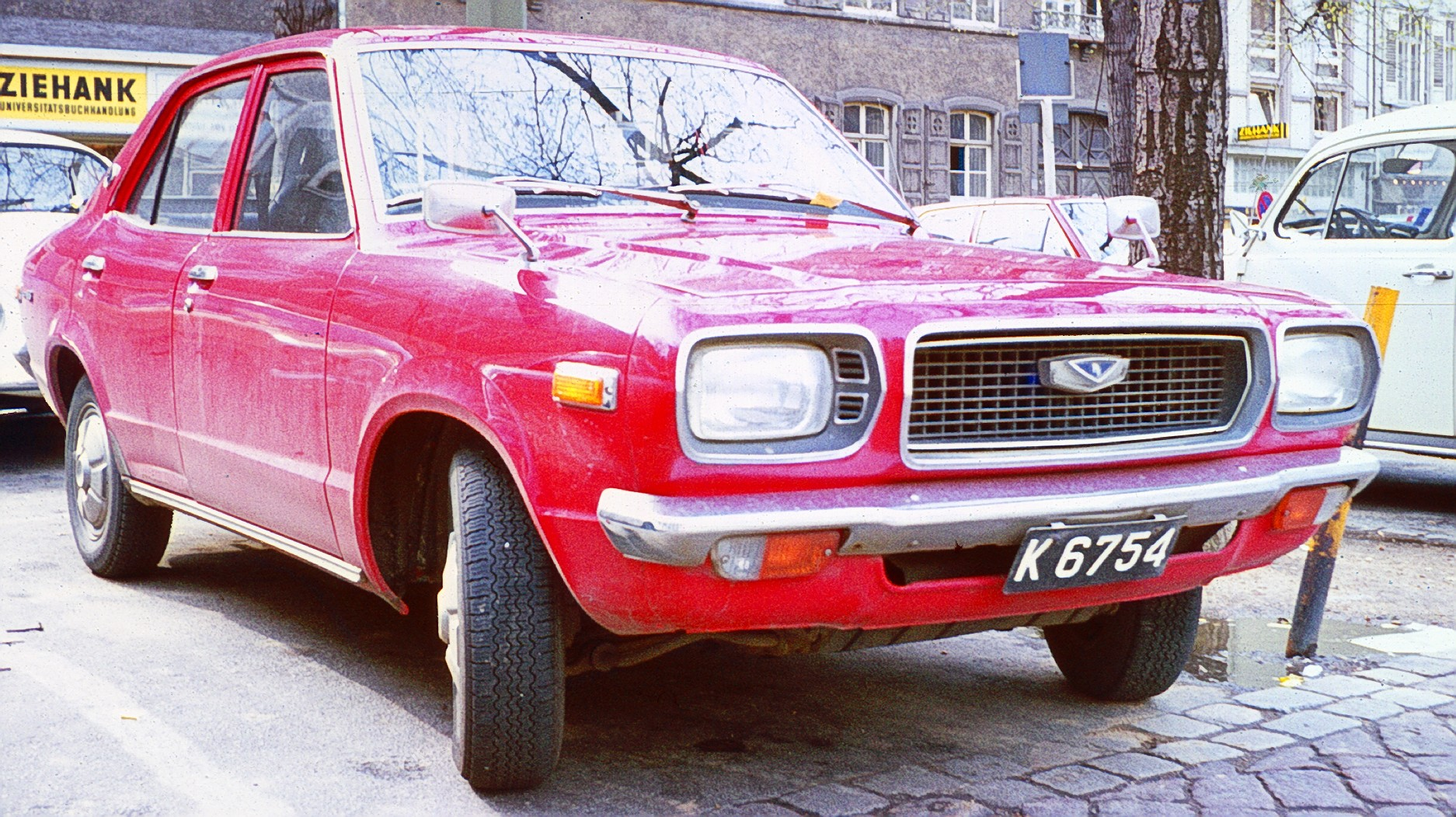
Mazda 818 sedan (Europe)

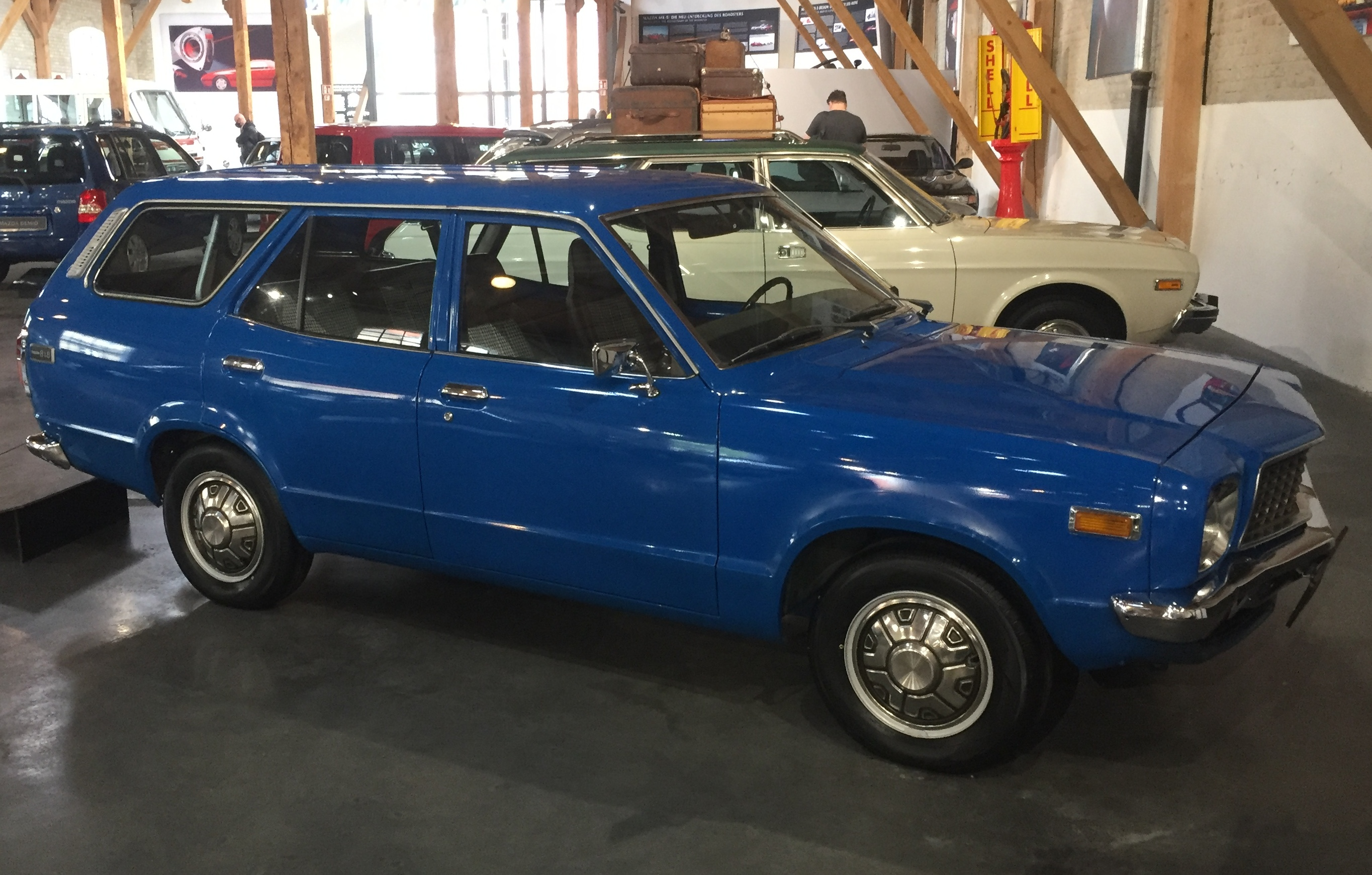
Mazda 818 wagon (Europe)

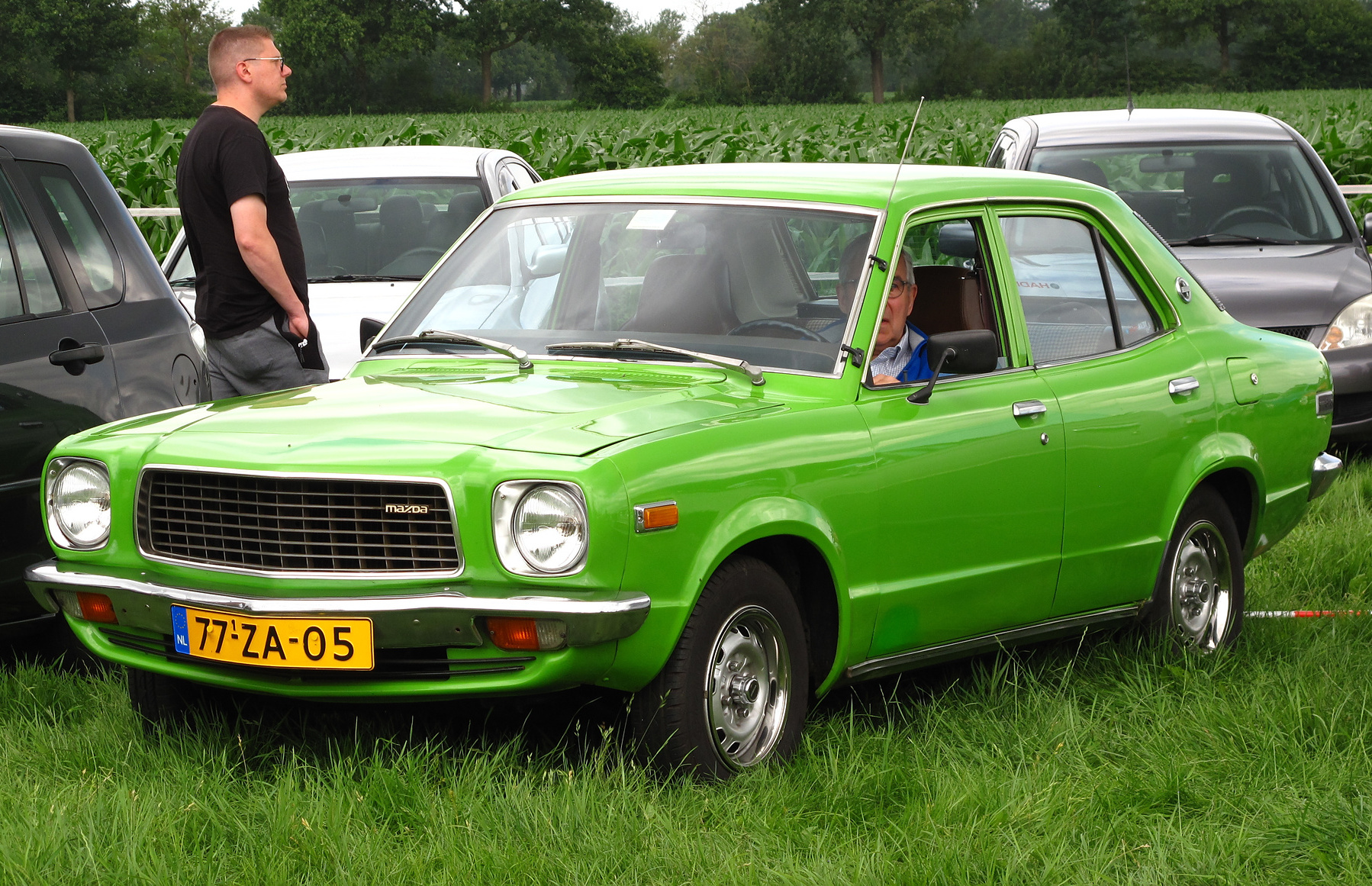
Mazda 818 sedan - facelift (Europe)

== Rotary engine: Mazda Savanna/RX-3 ==
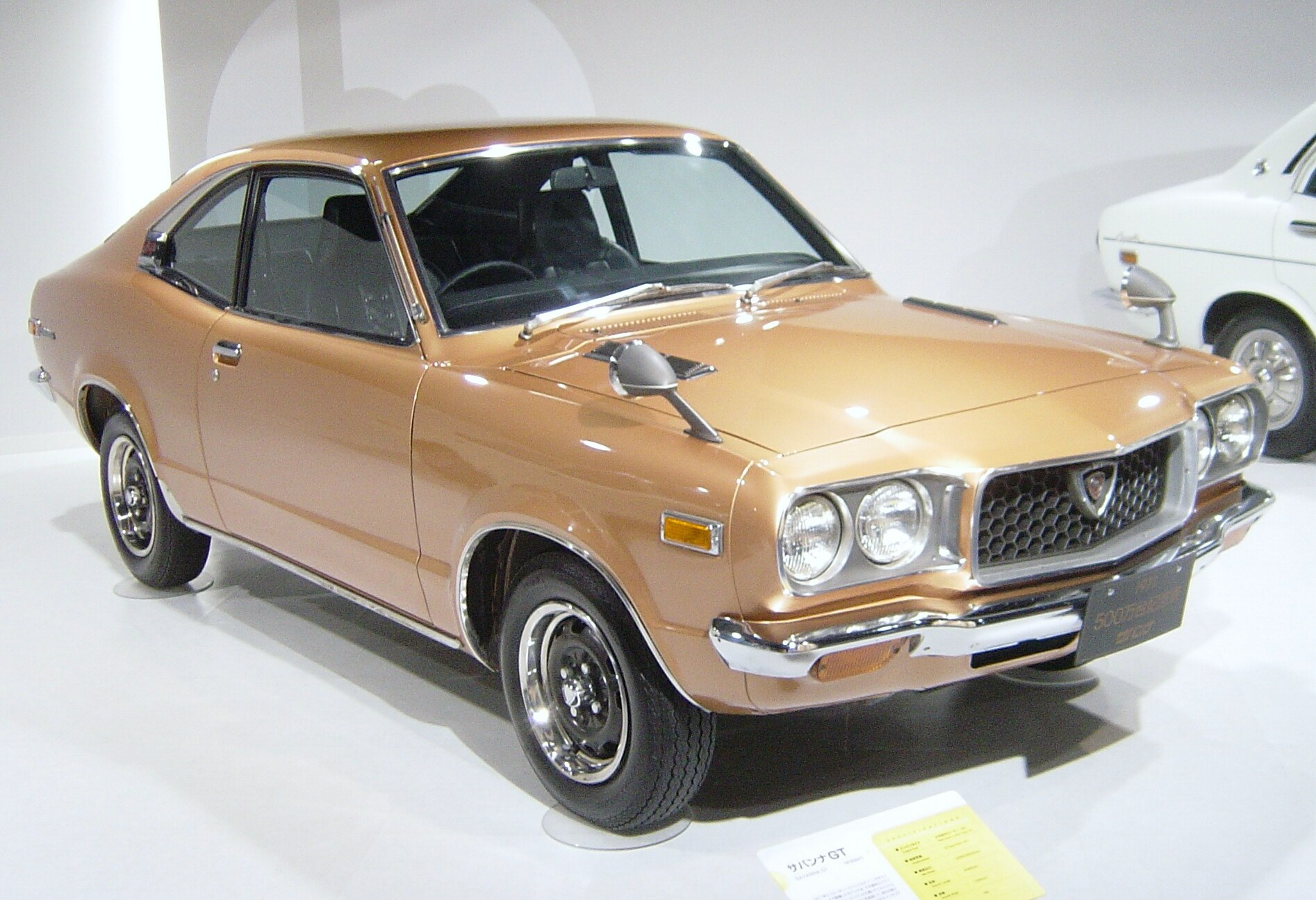
Mazda Savanna GT (S102)

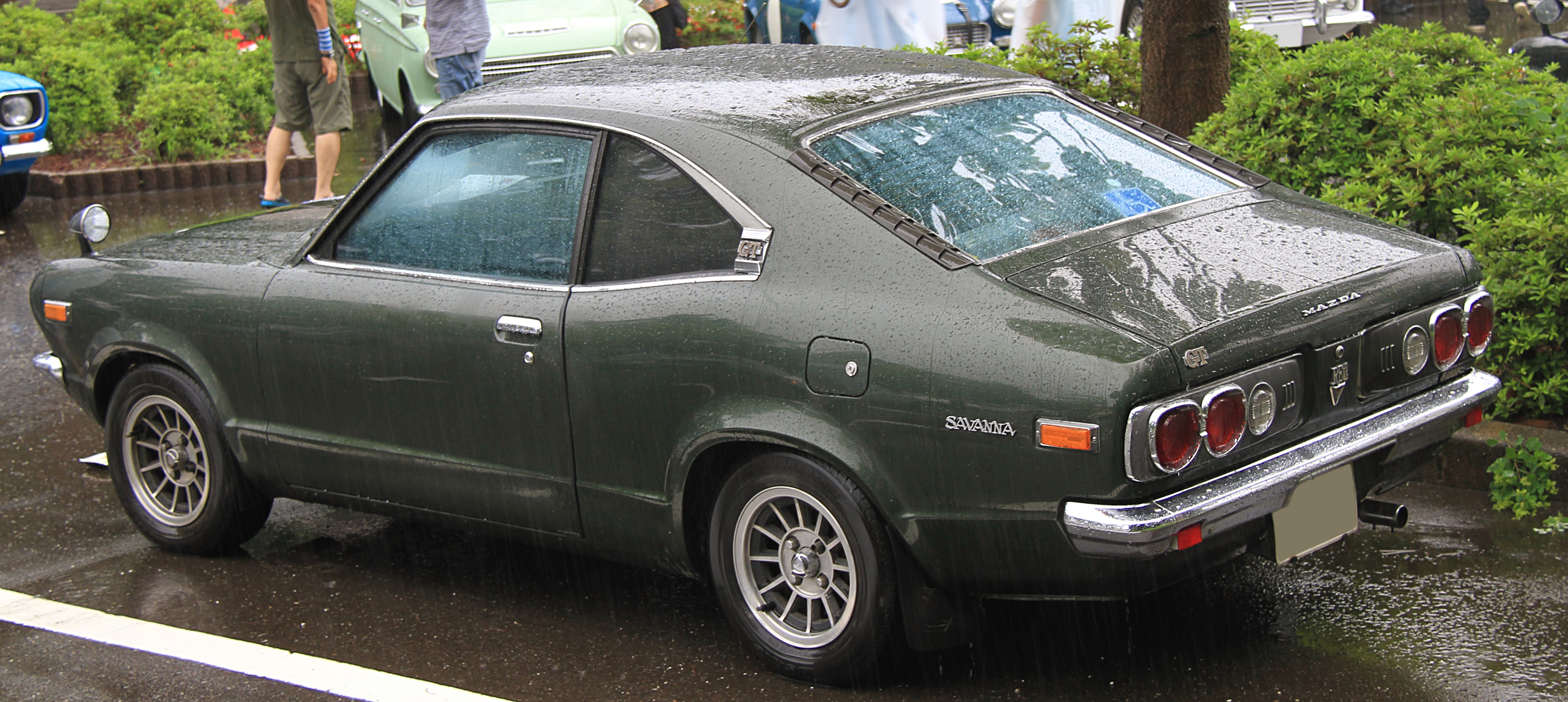
Mazda Savanna GT (S102)

The name Mazda Savanna (sometimes incorrectly spelled "Savannah") was used on the rotary-powered model sold in Japan, as a coupe, sedan, and wagon. Internationally it was called the Mazda RX-3. It was smaller and sportier than its brother, the Capella Rotary/RX-2, and was largely identical to its conventional inline-four donor model, the Mazda Grand Familia. It was available from September 1971 through 1978 in Super Deluxe coupé, Deluxe sedan, and station wagon forms. The Super Deluxe coupé was heavier (884 kg vs 864 kg) and carried an optional body stripe, clock, rear defogger and the centre console/high armrest and collapsible steering column. Sold from 1972 through 1978 in the United States, the RX-3 version was extremely successful.

It originally used a 10A rotary engine like the Mazda Familia Rotary Coupe/Mazda R100, but US cars shared the larger 12A engine from the RX-2. Performance-wise the 10A RX-3 was not able to match the RX-2 with 12A. With a weight-to-power ratio of 10.9 kg per kW compared to the RX-2's 9.9 kg per kW, the RX-3 was slower. The 12A RX-3 wasn't able to match the RX-2 with 12A either, despite its lighter weight. The smaller engined version has the internal model code S102A, while the larger one is known as the S124A.

In Japan, the installation of a rotary engine gave Japanese buyers a financial advantage when it came time to pay the annual road tax in that they bought a car that was more powerful than a traditional inline engine, but without having the penalty for having an engine in the higher 1.5 litre tax bracket.

=== Series I S102A & S124A (1971–1973) ===
The first Mazda Savanna went on sale in September 1971 and remained in production until 1977. It was sold as the Mazda RX-3 internationally when installed with the rotary engine and was otherwise largely identical to the inline-four-equipped Mazda Grand Familia. Externally the Savanna and export RX-3 was differentiated from its piston engines sibling by a nose panel with dual round headlights and a more prominent and pointed honeycomb grille, and round tail lights on the rear of sedans and coupés. A station wagon version, the RX-3 Sports Wagon, was sold for just one year in the U.S., from 1972 to 1973, when it was replaced by the Luce/RX-4 wagon. However the "Savanna Sports Wagon" remained in production in Japan right through until the end of Savanna production in 1977. Initially in all markets except North America all cars were designated S102A and came with the 982 cc (2x491 cc) 10A. S124A cars introduced later on came with the 1146 cc (2x573 cc) 12A. While the larger S124A eventually replaced the S102A in most markets, the S102A remained on sale alongside the S124A in Japan through to early 1974 with all the Series II updates. The Series I S102A remained on sale in some markets even longer, being available in the United Kingdom until the 1975 model year at least, though this was most likely as a result of stocks of earlier production vehicles remaining unsold due to a combination of both the fuel crisis and the rotary engine's early reputation for poor reliability.

While the Series I Savanna and RX-3 were powered by the 10A in Japan, Australia, and Europe, North American markets got the larger 12A taken from the RX-2 coupled to either a four speed manual or automatic transmission. Along with this engine change came the chassis prefix S124A. The 1972 Savanna / RX-3 Sports Wagon was the world's first rotary-powered station wagon.

In September 1972 the Savanna GT went on sale exclusively in Japan. This model received the larger 12A motor with 125 PS (92 kW) and was coupled to a five speed transmission. Along with this came slightly lowered suspension, as well as wider 5.5" rims. It received revised tail lights and a 5 Speed badge on the rear, an RE12 badge on the grille, and a completely redesigned dashboard and console exclusive to the model. It also had unique leather-like vinyl upholstery with GT embossed on the headrests. It came also with the chassis code S124A.

The 10A engine output was 105 PS (77 kW) and 100 lb·ft (135 Nm). 0–60 mph (0–97 km/h) acceleration time was 10.8 seconds, and the car ran a 17.6 second quarter-mile (400 m) (versus 16.3 for the RX-2). In 1972 all rotary engines had their die-cast rotor housing coated with a new process: The new Transplant Coating Process (TCP) featured sprayed-on steel which is then coated with chrome, giving greatly increased engine life.

=== Series II & III S102A & 124A (1973–1978) ===
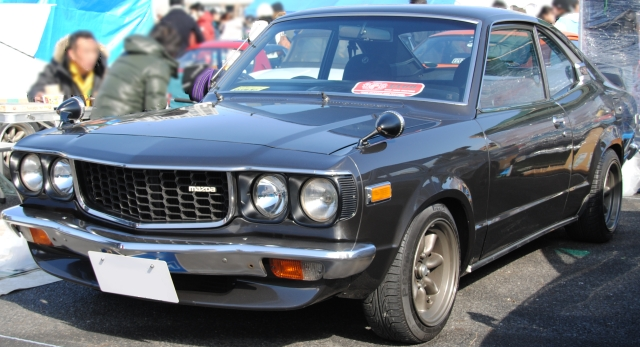
Mazda Savanna (S124; Series 3)

In mid 1973, Mazda released a visually updated Savanna in Japan, though drivetrain choices remained the same with the S102A 10A and the S124A 12A both available in twin distributor form. Externally the entire front end sheet metal was revamped and a different set of taillights with twin brake lights were included (commonly known as Savanna tail lights in Australia). In the months that followed, the range was updated to the single distributor 12A and the 10A motor was discontinued in early 1974. The Series II RX-3 came to Australia in March 1974 powered by the new 12A single distributor (12B). The starter motor was relocated in these updated engines from the top of the engine to the lower left hand rear side. Other internal 12A changes included moving from dual row side seals to single row and significant changes to apex seal design. The Series II was slower than the 10A Series I down the quarter mile even with the 1,146 cc 12A's greater capacity and 15 percent more power. The Rotary Engine Anti Pollution System (REAPS) hurt torque. As a result, the Series 2 was slow off the mark but had a better top speed. The loss of torque plus a 44-kilo weight increase slowed the Series II to a 17.8 second quarter mile. Interior changes were minor and included a change from the km/h/mph speedometer to a 200 km/h speedometer (180 km/h for the 808), an exhaust overhead light, a 50 Amp ammeter (up from 30 Amps) plus design changes to the trims and seat belts. Notably the radio antenna was enhanced by a twin post (rather than single) design. The 1974 model kept the three spoke plastic wood grain steering wheel; the 1975 received a fake leather wheel with slots cut into its three spokes.

The new 12A single distributor engine output was 130 PS (96 kW) and 156 N⋅m (115 lb⋅ft). 0–60 mph (0–97 km/h) time was 10.8 seconds, and the car ran a 17.7 second quarter-mile (400 m). Federalized cars (for the United States) produce 90 hp (67 kW) at 6000 rpm and 94 lb⋅ft (127 N⋅m) at 4000 rpm.

The Japanese market Savanna was updated visually in June 1973, though drive lines weren't updated until later in the year. Mazda put the new 12A "AP" single-distributor engine in the RX-3 in late 1973. It was refreshed again in 1975 with a "REAPS-5" engine.

In 1976 the Series III Savanna / RX-3 was released in Japan and the U.S., but exports to Australia and New Zealand ceased. The nose cone wore a new lower spoiler-type lip, and the rotor shaped badge was replaced with a new Mazda corporate font badge on the grille, offset to the left of centre. Overall these and other detail changes made the cars much plainer, and certainly lost the model some of its charm. In the U.S. the 1976 rear lights were hexagons. The 1977 rear lights were rectangular. An optional RX-3 'special appearance package' called the RX-3sp was sold in 1977 to advertise the new 75,000 mile engine guarantee for rotary engines. The 1978 RX-3's were only sold as 'off-road' (race) versions. The Savanna and RX-3 production was phased out in 1978 to make room for the new Mazda RX-7.

Of all the pre-RX-7 rotary vehicles Mazda built (930,000 in total), the RX-3 was by far the most popular. Of all the RX-3's built, the coupe exceeded 50 percent of total sale – all facts which influenced the design profile of the RX-7.

The rotary engine had financial advantages to Japanese consumers in that the engine displacement remained below 1.5 litres, a significant determination when paying the Japanese annual road tax which kept the obligation affordable to most buyers, while having more power than the traditional inline engines.

=== Racing ===
The Savanna/RX-3 was the next Mazda racing entry, following up the success of the Cosmo and Familia Rotary. The Savanna debuted with a win at the September, 1971 "Fuji 500" race.

The cars battled with Nissan's Skyline on the Japanese Grand Prix in 1972, winning the touring car category there and preventing the GT-R from winning 50 consecutive races. The cars continued to be competitive, claiming over 100 victories by 1976. A special edition "V100" model was released for sale in Japan to commemorate this occasion. Many vehicles continue in club racing to this day.

In Australia the RX-3 proved very successful both on and off the race track. One of many RX-3s racing in the 1975 Bathurst 1000 caused more than a worried look after placing fifth outright and 1st in its class for the second consecutive year after its initial class win in 1974. The RX-3 dominated the class C in 1975 holding 4 of the top 5 positions.

In New Zealand, the RX-3 proved very successful in rallying. Local legend Rod Millen finished fifth in the 1977 Rally New Zealand, where 17 of the 100 cars starting were RX-3s (along with one 808). Millen won the first three New Zealand Rally Championships, in 1975, 1976, and 1977. The cars remained competitive locally into the 1980s and was the only Mazda to score WRC points (in 1977 and 1979) between 1977 and 1982, until Millen changed over to the Mazda RX-7. In 1976, a piston-engined Mazda 818 finished eighth in the 1976 Rallye de Portugal, earning Mazda's first WRC points.

In North America, the RX-3 had much success in SCCA and IMSA competition. Many RX-3s are still competing and one in particular is the SCCA Super Production car driven by Irish driver John Cummins. The RX-3 was replaced with the Mazda RX-4.
