= Mazda E engine =

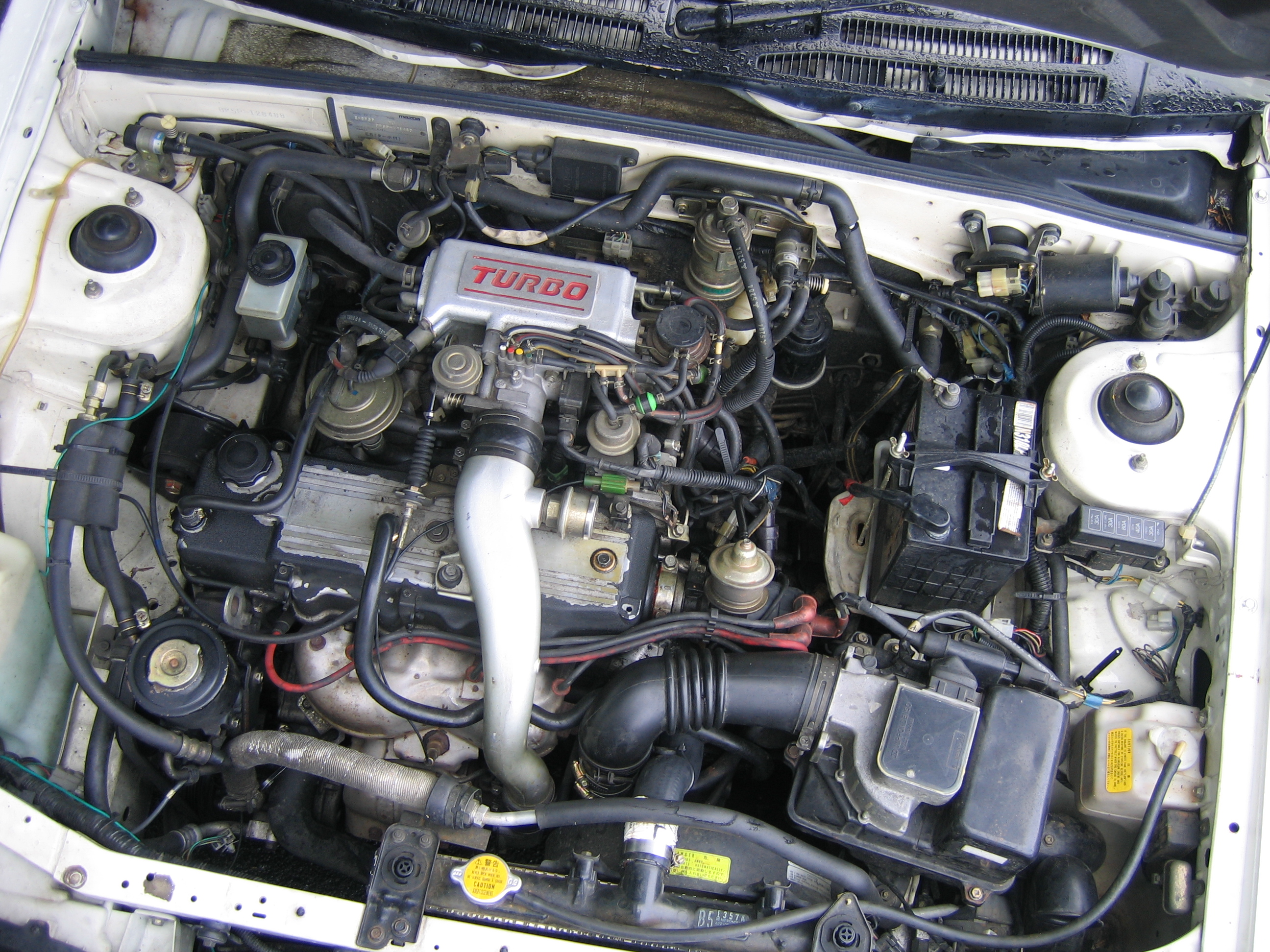
- E5T engine in a 1986 Mazda Familia XG Turbo.

Overview
- Manufacturer: Mazda
- Production: 1980–1997

Layout
- Configuration: Inline-4
- Displacement: 1.1 L (1,071 cc); 1.3 L (1,296 cc); 1.5 L (1,490 cc)
- Cylinder bore: 70 mm (2.76 in); 77 mm (3.03 in)
- Piston stroke: 69.6 mm (2.74 in); 80 mm (3.15 in)
- Cylinder block material: Cast iron
- Cylinder head material: Alloy
- Valvetrain: SOHC 8-valve

Combustion
- Turbocharger: IHI VJ1 or RHB52 (on E5T)
- Fuel system: Aisan 26-30 carburettor; Hitachi DCT306W-L1/R1 carburettors (on 1982–1983 E5S); Hitachi DCS306-31 carburettors (on 1984 E5S); Solex 32 DIS carburettor (on E5T Carb); Multi-point fuel injection (on E5F/T)
- Fuel type: Gasoline
- Cooling system: Water-cooled

Output
- Power output: 55–115 PS (54–113 hp; 40–85 kW)
- Torque output: 88–162 N⋅m (65–119 lb⋅ft; 9–17 kg⋅m)

Chronology
- Predecessor: Mazda C engine
- Successor: Mazda B engine

The iron-block, alloy head E family was an evolution of Mazda's xC design. It was released in June 1980 with the introduction of the first front-wheel drive Mazda Familias and Ford Lasers. Some later variants of the E5-powered Mazda Familia and Ford Laser in Japan incorporated a full-time 4WD drivetrain. All E engines were chain-driven, 8-valve SOHC. Notable features include siamesed cylinders, aluminium rocker arms and pistons, thin block walls, and single valve springs - all in the interest of reducing weight.

== E1 ==
The 1.1 L (1,071 cc) E1 was found in the 1980–1985 Mazda Familia and Ford Laser. It used a 70 mm × 69.6 mm (2.76 in × 2.74 in) bore x stroke with 9.2:1 compression ratio and produced 55 PS (54 hp; 40 kW) and 88 N⋅m (65 lb⋅ft; 9 kg⋅m) (DIN). It continued to be used until 1987 for the next generation 323 in some markets. The E1 was strictly intended for export markets where taxes based on engine size made this a popular alternative. It was never available in Japan, nor in North America or Australia.

== E3 ==
The larger E3 displaces 1.3 L (1,296 cc) with a wider 77 mm (3.03 in) bore and the same 9.2:1 compression ratio. It produced 74 PS (73 hp; 54 kW) and 103 N⋅m (76 lb⋅ft; 11 kg⋅m) (JIS gross) in Japan or 60 PS (59 hp; 44 kW) and 93 N⋅m (69 lb⋅ft; 9 kg⋅m) (DIN) for export market. It was found in the 1980–1985 Mazda Familia, Ford Laser and FWD 1981–1986 Mazda GLC. It was used until August 1994 for the Mazda Familia Van/Wagon (323) and continued until around 1997 for Ford Laser taxi fleets in Indonesia.

== E5 ==
The 1.5 L (1,490 cc) E5 pushed the stroke to an undersquare 77 mm × 80 mm (3.03 in × 3.15 in) with 9.0:1 compression ratio. It was used in the 1980–1985 Mazda Familia, Ford Laser and FWD 1981–1986 Mazda GLC.

This engine produced 85 PS (84 hp; 63 kW) and 120 N⋅m (89 lb⋅ft; 12 kg⋅m) (JIS gross) in Japan and 69–75 PS (68–74 hp; 51–55 kW) and 109–112 N⋅m (80–83 lb⋅ft; 11–11 kg⋅m) (DIN) for export market.

=== E5F ===
The E5F was a fuel-injected variant of the E5, released in 1982 and available only in Japan. It produced 95 PS (94 hp; 70 kW) and 124 N⋅m (91 lb⋅ft; 13 kg⋅m) (JIS gross).

=== E5S ===
In certain markets a twin-carburetted, high-compression (10.0:1) version exists, dubbed the E5S. Available for Mazda 323 GT and Ford Laser Sport. For 1982 and 1983, this engine was equipped with two Hitachi DCT306W-L1/R1 carburettors, it produced 85 PS (84 hp; 63 kW) and 120 N⋅m (89 lb⋅ft; 12 kg⋅m) (DIN). Late in 1983, new two Hitachi DCS306-31 carburettors appeared and produced 88 PS (87 hp; 65 kW) and 122 N⋅m (90 lb⋅ft; 12 kg⋅m) (DIN).

=== E5T ===
The flagship turbocharged, lower-compression (8.2:1) pistons, fuel-injected and non-intercooled variant of the E5 was the E5T. Released in 1983 and available only in Japan, the E5T utilized an IHI-supplied VJ1 turbocharger running approximately 0.5 bar (7.3 psi) to produce as much as 115 PS (113 hp; 85 kW) and 162 N⋅m (119 lb⋅ft; 17 kg⋅m) (JIS gross). Other notable advancements included an integrated knock sensor (supplied by Mitsubishi) and multi-point fuel injection as standard.

This was Mazda's first production 4-cylinder turbo engine and was found in the top-of-the-line 1982–1985 Mazda Familia XGi-R Turbo and Ford Laser S Turbo as well as the early Mazda Familia XG Turbo, XG-R Turbo and Ford Laser TX3 Turbo models. Most of the technological features found in this engine were carried over to the later Mazda B6T.

=== E5T Carb ===
A strange carburettor turbocharged version of the E5 was the E5T Carb. It was exclusively available in Australia as part of the White Lightning Ford Laser limited-edition package of just 300 cars released in June 1985. The engine started out as a normal E5S and then an IHI RHB52 turbocharger was fitted, setup in a blow-through style, with boost limited to just 5.1 psi (0.35 bar). A modified version of the stock carburettor known as a "Solex 32 DIS (turbo)" was fitted to provide fuelling. A Compuspark ignition system with knock sensor was also added to prevent engine damage if the driver ever used a lower octane fuel than the 97 RON that was recommended. As the carburettors were not boost referenced, they were difficult to maintain and often suffered from float rupture or excessive flooding. Unlike its more reliable fuel-injected counterpart, the E5T carb turbo setup was notoriously difficult to maintain and some cars had the turbo systems removed instead of having them replaced. This engine produced 106 PS (105 hp; 78 kW) and 162 N⋅m (119 lb⋅ft; 17 kg⋅m).

== See also ==
- Mazda engines
