= Mazda C engine =

Overview
- Manufacturer: Mazda

Layout
- Configuration: Inline-4
- Displacement: 1.0 L (985 cc); 1.3 L (1,272 cc); 1.4 L (1,415 cc); 1.5 L (1,490 cc); 1.6 L (1,586 cc); 1.8 L (1,796 cc)
- Cylinder bore: 70 mm (2.76 in); 73 mm (2.87 in); 77 mm (3.03 in); 78 mm (3.07 in)
- Piston stroke: 64 mm (2.52 in); 76 mm (2.99 in); 78 mm (3.07 in); 83 mm (3.27 in); 94 mm (3.70 in)
- Valvetrain: SOHC 8-valve

Combustion
- Fuel system: Single Nikki or Hitachi carburetor
- Fuel type: Gasoline
- Cooling system: Water-cooled

Output
- Power output: 45–104 hp (34–78 kW; 46–105 PS)
- Torque output: 7–15.5 kg⋅m (69–152 N⋅m; 51–112 lbf⋅ft)

The C family was Mazda's first large piston engine design. It is not certain whether Mazda has a name for this collection of engines, and it is uncertain precisely which ones are related.

== PC ==
The 985 cc (1.0 L; 60.1 cu in) PC engine featured a 70 mm × 64 mm (2.76 in × 2.52 in) bore and stroke. It was an eight-valve SOHC design and was designed for rear wheel drive longitudinal applications. The PC produced 45 PS (33 kW; 44 hp) and 7 kg⋅m (69 N⋅m; 51 lbf⋅ft) in the export market 323.

Applications:

- 1965–1967 Mazda Familia 1000 Coupé
- 1977–1983 Mazda Familia/323 (FA4P)

== TC ==
The 1,272 cc (1.3 L; 77.6 cu in) TC had a 73 mm × 76 mm (2.87 in × 2.99 in) bore and stroke; a bored and stroked version of the PC. Used in the 1970, 1973, and 1977 Mazda Familia, and the 1979 – 1984 Mazda Bongo / Ford Econovans as the smaller engine option, the larger being the 1.6 L Mazda NA engine. For 1977 a new, prize-winning lean burn version of the TC was developed for the new FA-series Familia, using a carburetor with an EGR valve. Thus equipped, the TC weighs 127 kg (280 lb).

Applications:

- 1970–1977 Mazda Familia/Familia Presto/Mazda 1300
- 1971–1978 Mazda Grand Familia/808/818/Mizer
- 1972–1975 Mazda B-Series/Ford Courier
- 1977.01 – 1980.06 Mazda Familia/323 FA4TS
- 1977–1985.12 Mazda Familia Cargo/323 Station Wagon FA4TV
- 1977.10–19?? Mazda Bongo BA2T8
- 1974.10 – 1981.12 Kia Brisa
- 1982.03–1984 Saehan/Daewoo Maepsy

== UC ==
1,415 cc (1.4 L; 86.3 cu in) 77 mm × 76 mm (3.03 in × 2.99 in) - A larger-bored version of the TC, used in the 1978–1980 Mazda GLC. Produced 70 hp (52 kW; 71 PS). This was also used in the 1979–1984 E1400/Econovan and for the new 1984 Ford Econovan as the base model engine. In continental Europe the Econovan/Mazda E-series continued to use the UC engine until at least 1990, in a version which produces 48 kW (65 PS; 64 hp). In some parts documentations, it is referred to as the D4, however no UC engine block was ever stamped D4. in 1980, this engine (and the smaller TC) was modernized and turned into the new E-series engine, intended for front-wheel drive applications.

== UB ==
The original 1966 Luce 1500 used a 1,490 cc (1.5 L; 90.9 cu in) SOHC inline-four with square 78 mm (3.07 in) bore and stroke. This engine, also used in the Capella and Grand Familia for a short while, was replaced by the stroked NA engine (below).

Applications:

- 1966–1972 Mazda Luce 1500 SUA, SUAV
- 1970–1973 Mazda Capella SU2A
- 1971–1973 Mazda Grand Familia S/808/818 SU4A, SU4V

== NA ==
The 1,586 cc (1.6 L; 96.8 cu in) SOHC NA engine was a UB, stroked to 83 mm (3.27 in). JDM output was 100 hp (75 kW; 101 PS) at 6000 rpm, with maximum torque of 14 kg⋅m (137 N⋅m; 101 lbf⋅ft) at 3500 rpm. US-spec was 70 hp (52 kW; 71 PS) at 5000 rpm, with maximum torque of 11.3 kg⋅m (111 N⋅m; 82 lbf⋅ft) at 3500 rpm with a single Nikkei carburetor. The rest of the world received a 75 hp (56 kW; 76 PS) version. Later on, this engine was also referred to as H6.

Applications:

- 1973.11–1978 Mazda Grand Familia/808/818 SN3A, SN4A
- 1974–1977 Mazda 808 (US)
- 1977–198? Mazda B1600/Proceed PE2N
- 1970.05 – 1978.09 Mazda Capella/616 SNA
- 1978.10 – 1982.09 Mazda Capella/626 CB2NS

== VB ==
A stroked to 94 mm (3.70 in) 1.8 L (1,796 cc) version of the UB/NA, retaining the same 78 mm (3.07 in) bore, was used in the 1968–1972 Luce 1800 and the 1975–1979 Mazda B1800s for the US market. In Canadian market B-series trucks, it was installed as early as 1970. Output for the 1972 Luce was 100 PS (74 kW; 99 hp) JIS at 5500 rpm and 15.5 kg⋅m (152 N⋅m; 112 lbf⋅ft) at 3000 rpm. Export model outputs varied, with European market models claiming 104 hp (78 kW; 105 PS) DIN (all other figures remaining the same).

- 1968–1972 Mazda Luce / 1800 SVA
- 1970–1977 Mazda B1800 (BVD61, North America)
- 1977–1979 Mazda B1800 (US)
- 1972–1979 Ford Courier

== See also ==
- Mazda engines
