= Mazda B series =

Series of pickup trucks made by Mazda

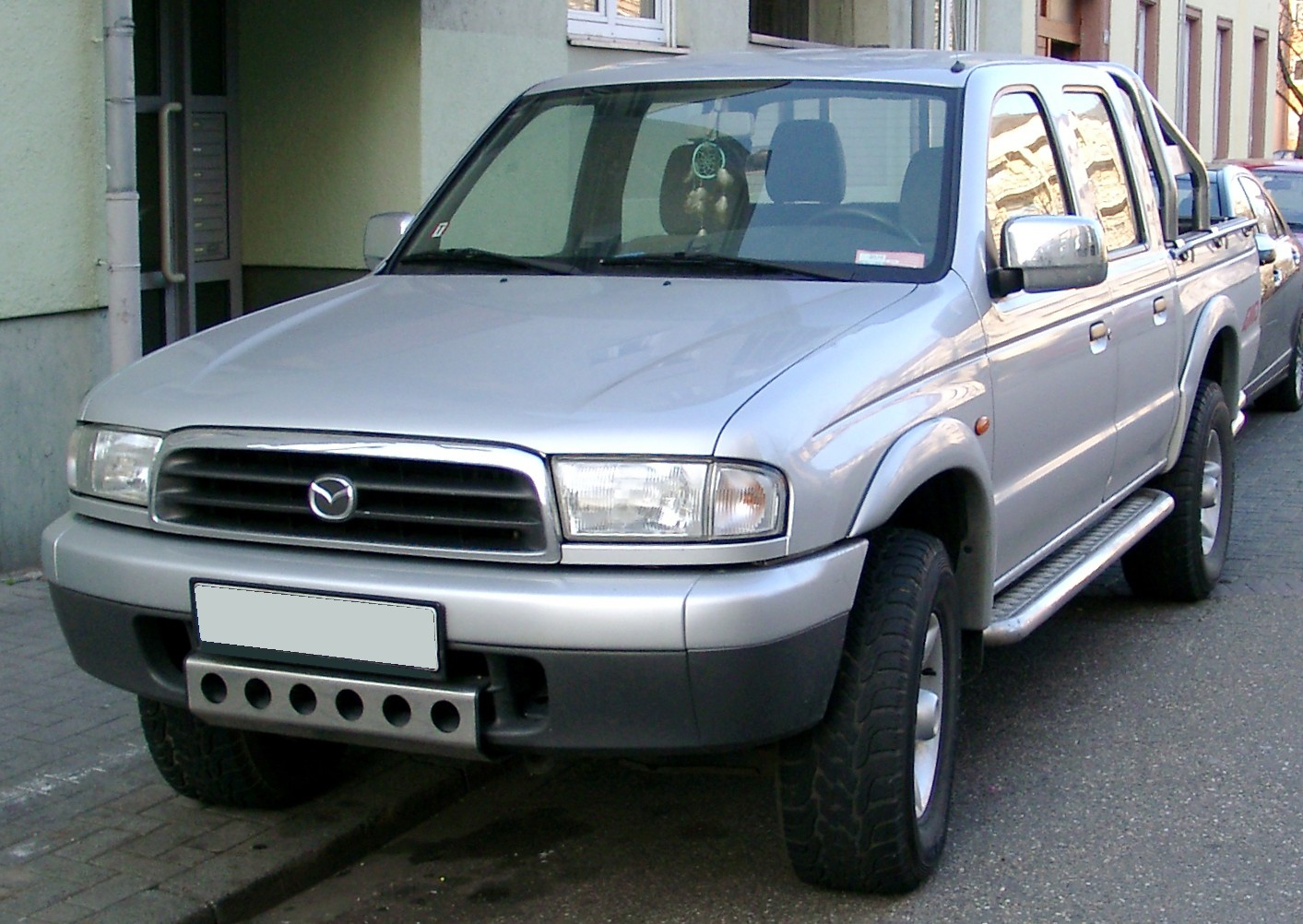

Overview
- Manufacturer: Mazda
- Production: 1961–2006

Body and chassis
- Class: Compact pickup truck

Chronology
- Successor: Mazda BT-50

The Mazda B series is a series of pickup trucks that was manufactured by Mazda. Produced across five generations from 1961 to 2006, the model line began life primarily as a commercial vehicle, slotted above a kei truck in size. Through its production, Mazda used engine displacement to determine model designations; a B1500 was fitted with a 1.5 L engine and a B2600, a 2.6 L engine.

In Japan, the B-series was referred to as the Mazda Proceed for much of its production, with several other names adopted by the model line. In Australia and New Zealand, the B-Series was named the Mazda Bravo and Mazda Bounty, respectively; South Africa used the Mazda Drifter name. Thailand used the Mazda Magnum, Thunder, and Fighter names. Through its association with Ford, Mazda produced the B-Series as the Ford Courier and the Ford Ranger. Conversely, the Ford Ranger was sold in North America as a Mazda B series from 1994 until 2010.

In 2006, the Mazda B-Series was replaced by the Mazda BT-50.

== Historic trucks ==
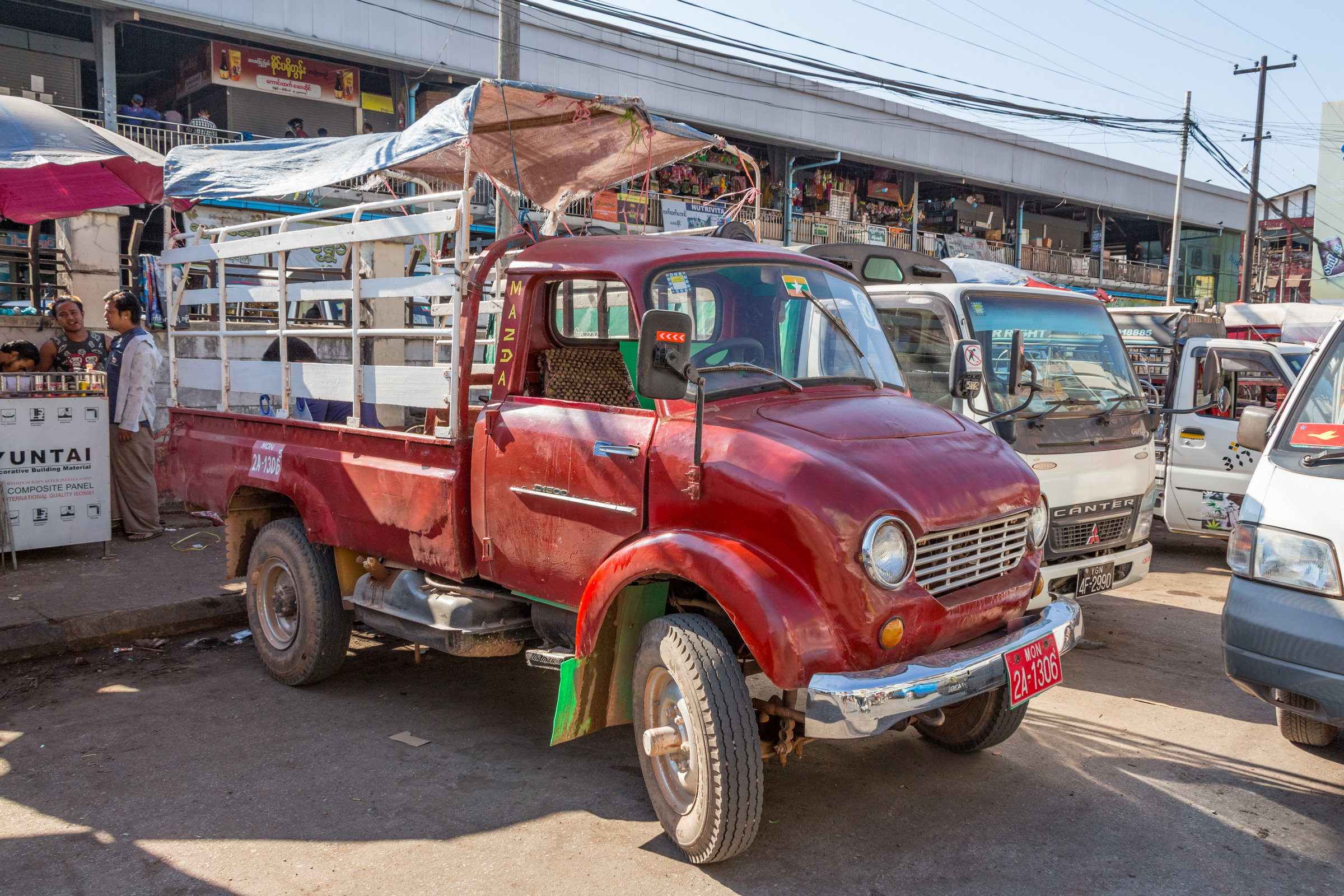
Mazda D1500 in Myanmar

Mazda's first vehicles were three-wheeled trucks, also known as auto rickshaws, starting with the 1931 Mazda-Go and followed by the Mazda K360 in 1959, the Mazda T1500, and finally the larger Mazda T2000. One of Mazda's first four-wheeled trucks was the 1958 D1100, briefly called the Mazda Romper, with a 1105 cc air-cooled in-line two cylinder engine installed under the seat. That engine was replaced by a water-cooled unit in 1959 and joined by the larger capacity D1500. In 1962, passenger car size requirements no longer applied to commercial vehicles and the truck grew longer, with a two-liter D2000 model becoming available while the smallest D1100 was discontinued. The D1500 and D2000 remained in production until the June 1965 introduction of the Mazda Kraft.

== First generation (1961–1965) ==
First generation
- Mazda B1500

Overview
- Production: 1961–1965
- Assembly: Japan: Hiroshima

Body and chassis
- Body style: 2-door pickup truck 2-door double-cab pickup truck 2-door double-cab coupé utility 2-door van
- Layout: Front-engine, rear-wheel-drive

Powertrain
- Engine: 1.5 L UA OHV I4
- Transmission: 3-speed manual 4-speed manual 3-speed automatic

Dimensions
- Wheelbase: 2,495 mm (98.2 in) (BUA); 2,590 mm (102.0 in) (BUB61)
- Length: 4,150 mm (163.4 in) (BUA61); 4,245 mm (167.1 in) (BUB61)

The Mazda B-series pickup truck was introduced in Japan in August 1961 as the B1500 (BUA61). This model was the only Japanese market model to be badged under the B-series naming scheme, i.e. B1500. The BUD61 (second generation) that followed was the first model of the long-running "Proceed" series sold in Japan. It had a 1,484 cc OHV water-cooled engine with wet sleeve cylinders which produced 44 kW (59 hp; 60 PS), and a one-ton payload. This model also had a torsion bar front/leaf spring rear suspension, which was advanced for its time, giving it a relatively smooth ride. The B1500 was remodeled between late 1962 and September 1963; it received a new chassis code, BUB61. The BUB61 was more spacious; its cabin was extended by 80 mm (3.1 in) and it had a stretched body and wheelbase. The BUB61 had a new, upside-down, trapezoidal grille instead of the earlier full-width unit, with thirteen bars rather than nine, turn signals on the fenders, and more chrome trim—including a decor strip on the side.

In addition to the standard two-door "styleside" pickup truck body there were also a double-cab truck, and a similar double-cab version called the "pickup." The "pickup" had a fully integrated coupé utility body rather than the separate bed of the truck version, as it was based on the somewhat passenger-oriented light van. This model was a two-door, fully glazed van with a fold-down tailgate and an electrically powered window, which was rare in the Japanese market at the time. The light van (BUAVD) was introduced in September 1962, and the two double-cab models followed shortly after. These three models were built on the shorter wheelbase chassis; when the longer chassis was introduced it was not deemed worthwhile to create new bodywork. These models were produced for only a few months. The B1500 was sleeker and considerably more powerful than its competitors in the Japanese market, but it was also markedly more expensive and it failed to sell in the expected quantities.

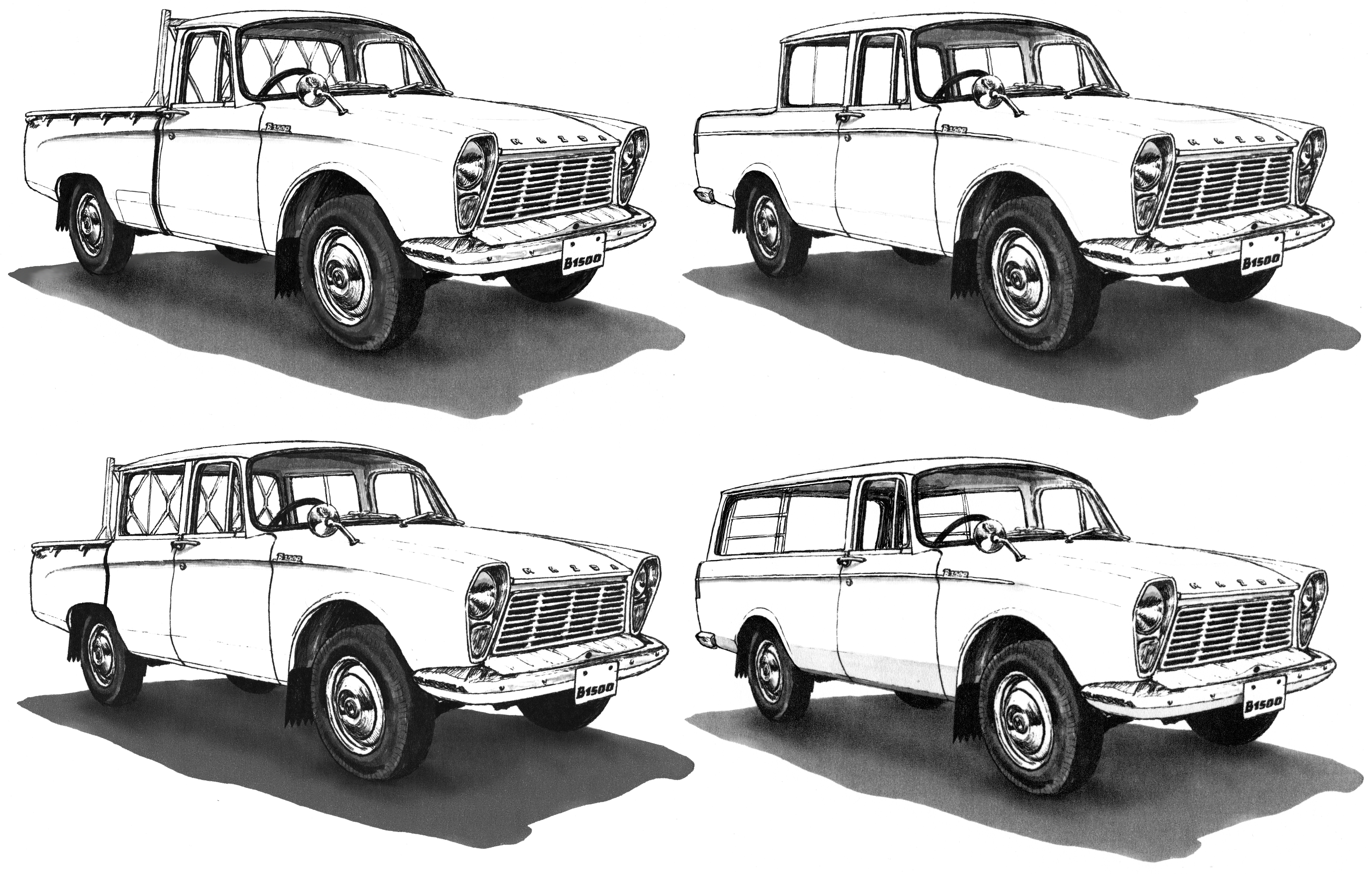
The first B1500 model: top left is the original truck, to the right the "Pickup", bottom left is the double-cab truck and on the bottom right is the "Light Van".

== Second generation (1965–1977) ==
Second generation
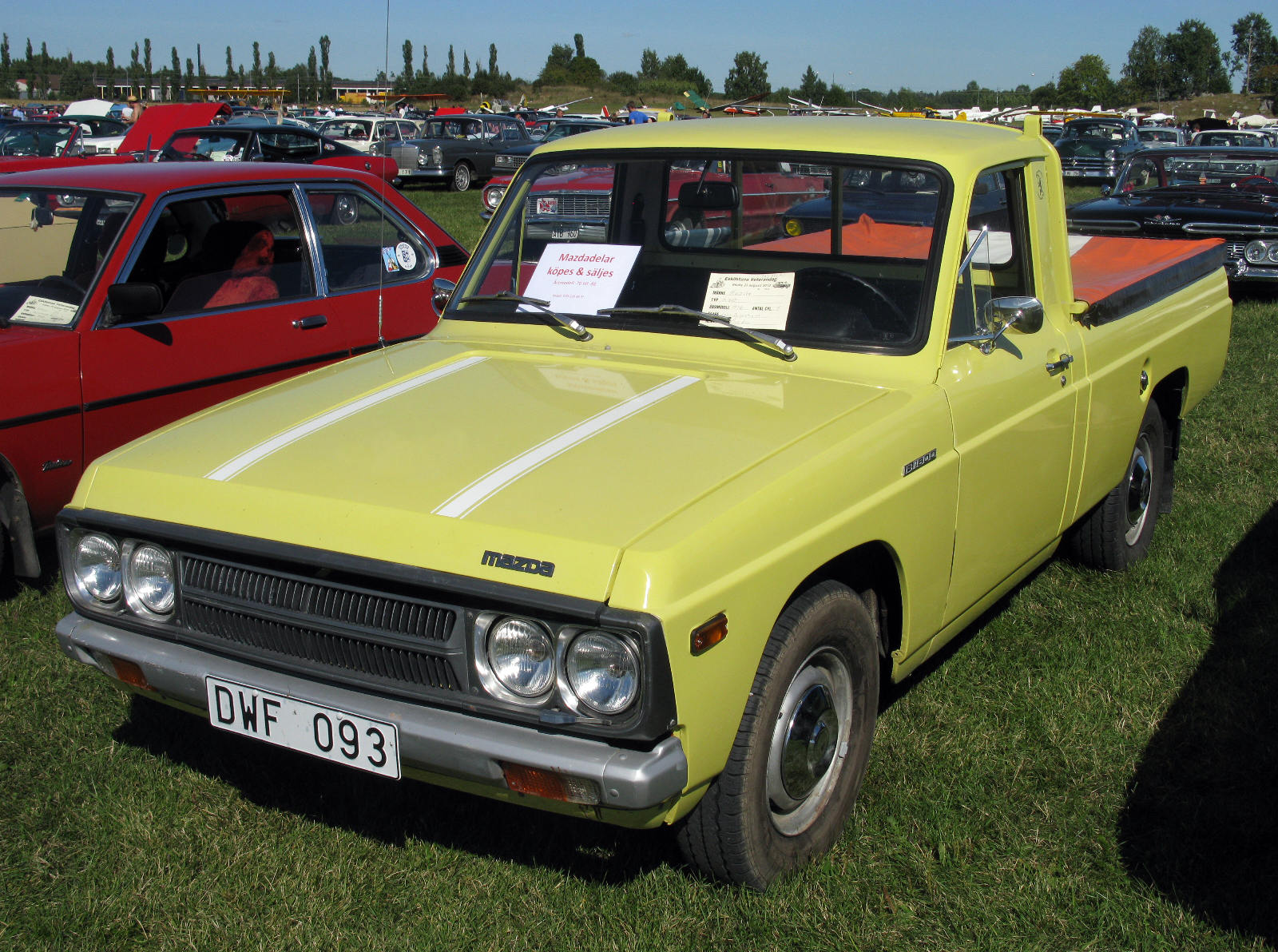
- Mazda B1600

Overview
- Also called: Mazda Proceed; Mazda B1500/1600/1800; Mazda Rotary Pickup; Ford Courier
- Production: 1965–1977
- Assembly: Japan: Hiroshima; New Zealand

Body and chassis
- Body style: 2-door truck
- Layout: Front-engine, rear-wheel-drive

Powertrain
- Engine: 1.3 L TC I4 (BTA67); 1.5 L UA OHV I4 (BUD61); 1.6 L NA I4 (BNA61); 1.8 L VB I4 (BVD61); 1.3 L 13B (PA136/SPA136)
- Transmission: 3-speed manual 4-speed manual 3-speed automatic

Dimensions
- Wheelbase: 2,575 mm (101.4 in) (1965–75) 2,650 mm (104.3 in) (1976–77); 2,641 mm (104.0 in) (REPU)
- Length: 4,370 mm (172.0 in); 4,394 mm (173.0 in) (REPU)
- Width: 1,702 mm (67.0 in) (REPU)
- Height: 1,549 mm (61.0 in) (REPU)

The 1966 B1500/Proceed presented in October 1965 used the same 1484 cc OHV I4 engine as its predecessor, with minor changes to the cylinder head and valves and the use of a downdraft carburetor instead of the sidedraft unit used on the models sold between 1961 and 1965. The UA engine now produced 72 PS (53 kW) at 5200 rpm. The chassis was now called the "BUD61"; it was longer than its predecessor and received new bodywork of a squarer design, and four headlights. In January 1971, a 1600 cc model with the chassis code BNA61 was introduced. This had 95 PS SAE in global markets; US brochures did not specify its power output and European importers claimed 75 PS DIN (55 kW). In Japan, 100 PS (74 kW) (SAE gross) was claimed; the model was advertised in Japan as the "GT-Truck".

In March 1972, the Proceed 1300, with a smaller 1.3-liter engine, was released and remained available in Japan until 1975. It had 87 PS (64 kW) in SAE gross. The B1500 was the first Japanese pickup truck to be assembled in New Zealand from CKD kits. Assembly started in 1967 at Steel's Motor Assemblies after a government order for 672 units; Steel's also built the Toyota Corona and later became Toyota New Zealand's Christchurch plant. The model remained in local assembly at various plants for several generations.

The B series was introduced to the United States with the 1972 B1600. In 1974, the similar rotary-powered Rotary Pickup was released in the US. The engine was enlarged to 1.8-liters for 1975's B1800, a model that had been available to Canadian customers since around 1970. It was known in the Japanese market as the "Proceed", where it was also sold as the Ford Courier. Its strong sales in the US market—mostly with Ford badging—relieved Mazda's pressing cash flow troubles in the period following the 1970s energy crisis.

Engines:

- 1972–1975 – 1.3 L (1272 cc) TC I4 (BTA67)
- 1965–1971 – 1.5 L (1484 cc) UA OHV I4 (BUD61)
- 1971–1976 – 1.6 L (1586 cc) NA I4 (BNA61), 95 PS (70 kW) SAE at 6000 rpm
- 1970–1977 – 1.8 L (1796 cc) VB I4 (BVD61), 98 hp (73 kW) SAE at 5500 rpm (1970, Canada)
- 1974–1977 – 1.3 L (654 cc x 2) 13B (PA136/SPA136)

=== Rotary Engine Pickup ===
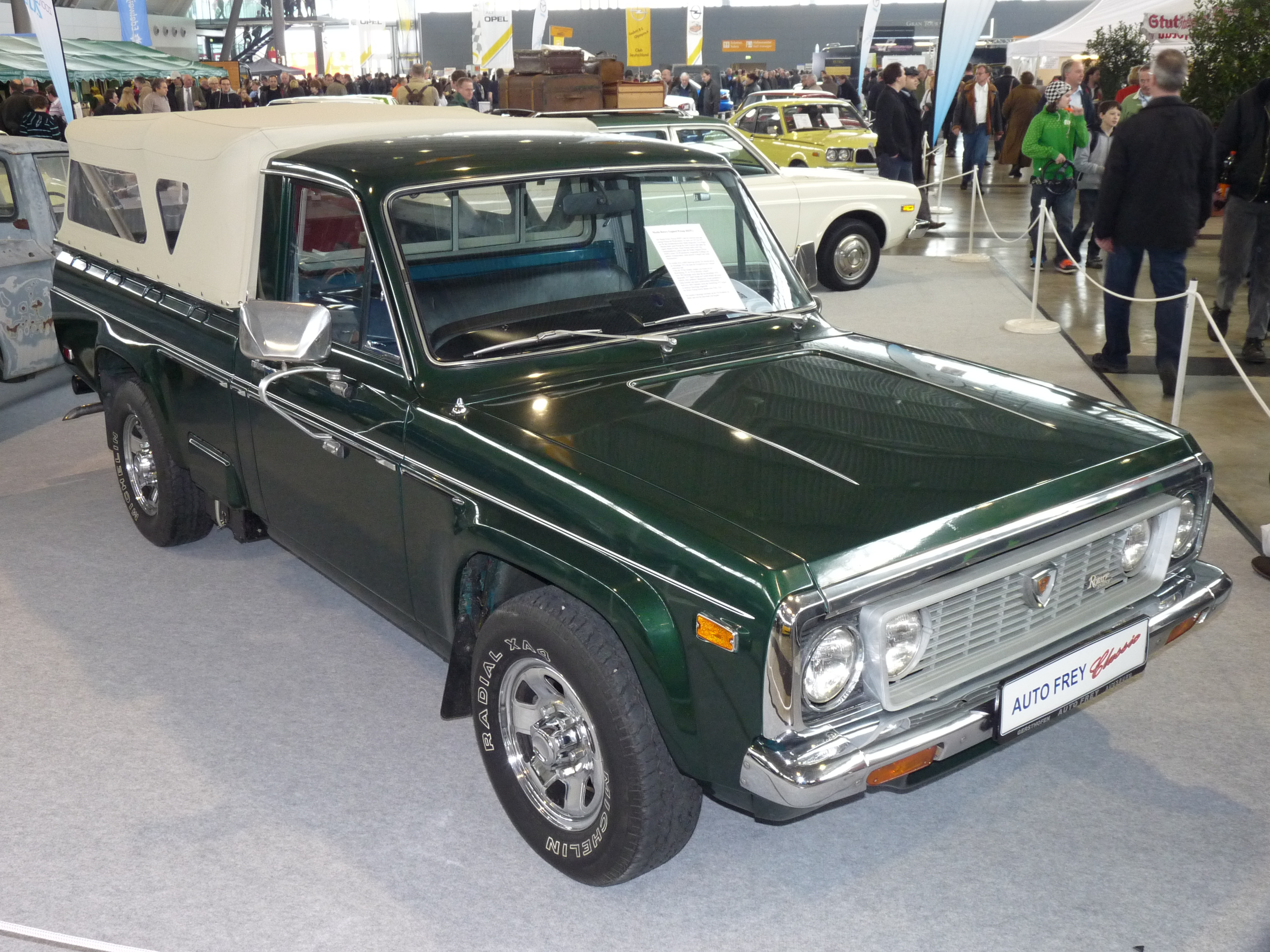
Mazda Rotary Pickup, with wheels from a 1986–89 Mazda B-Series LX.

The Rotary Engine Pick-up (REPU) was the world's first and only Wankel-engined pickup truck. It was sold from 1974 to 1977 and was only available in the North American Market. The Rotary-Engined Pickup (REPU) had a four-port 1.3-liter 13B four-barrel carbureted engine, flared fenders, a battery mounted under the bed, a different dash, a front grille, and round taillights.

In the first model year, 1974, 14,366 were sold in North America Most were made for the 1974 model year (PA136 chassis), but the effect of the energy crisis on sales caused Mazda to restamp many of the 1974 models with a prefix "S", designating them as 1975 models; (SPA136). Sales dropped, with 632 units sold in the 1976 model year, when the four-speed manual transmission was upgraded to a five-speed. Mazda invested in a moderate redesign for the 1977 model (PA236), updating its electrical systems and adding a 3 in (76 mm) cab stretch for increased comfort. Sales never recovered with 1,161 sold in 1977, after which the REPU was discontinued.

Road & Track magazine was impressed with its "smooth, quiet power" and "nice" interior. The vehicle retailed for about US$3,500 (equivalent to $22,849 in 2025); its observed fuel economy was 16.5 miles per US gallon (14.3 L/100 km; 19.8 mpg_{‑imp}). Most of the trucks are found on the West Coast of the US; they continue to be sought out by enthusiasts. Like many Mazda rotary vehicles, the REPU was raced. It took third place in the 1976 SCCA Mojave 24 Hour Rally driven by Malcolm Smith and Jack Sreenan.

=== Ford Courier ===
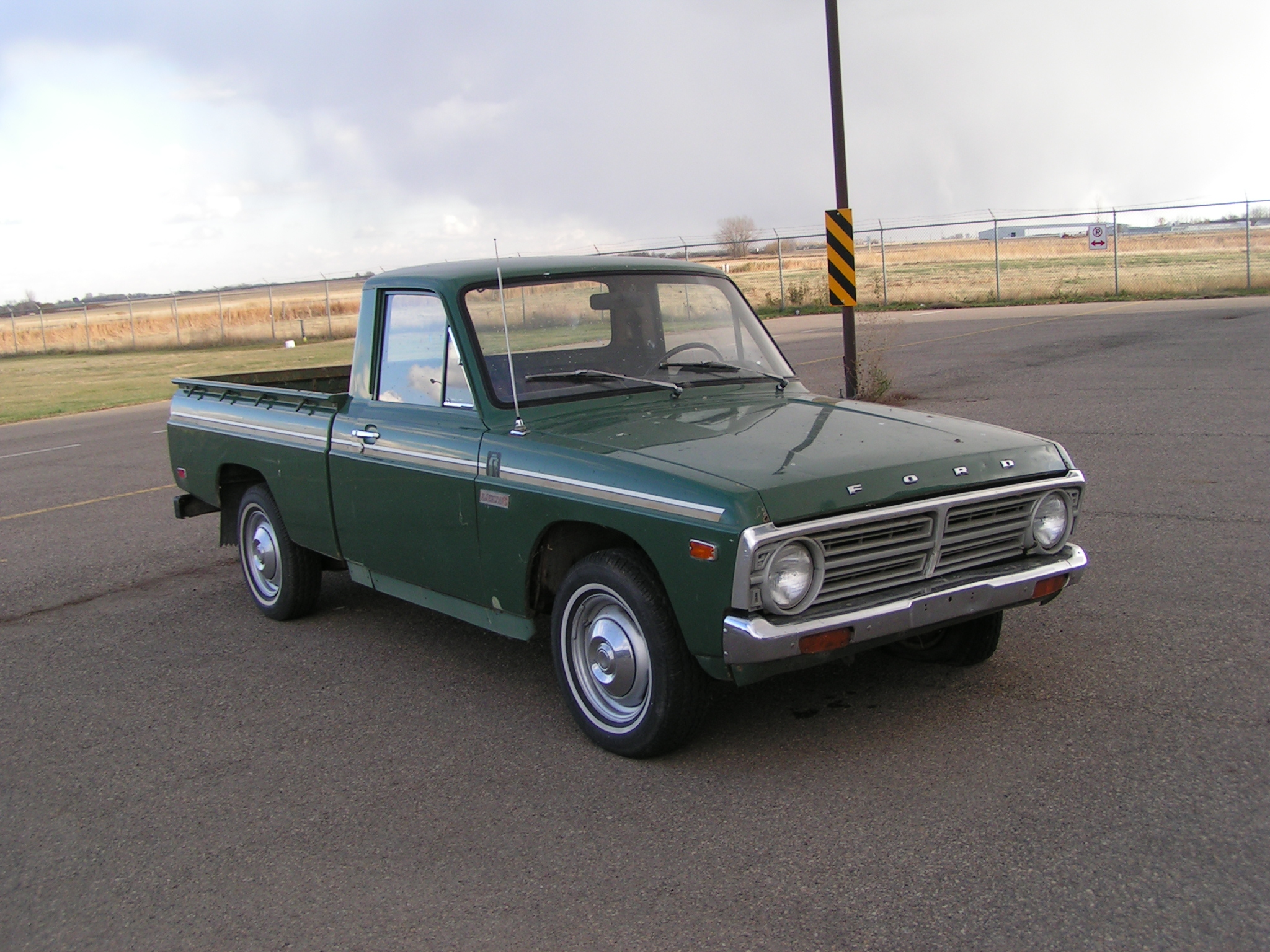
Ford Courier

The first generation Ford Courier was introduced for the 1972 model year and sold for a little over US$3,000 (equivalent to $23,091 in 2025) when introduced—close to the price of a Ford F-100. The Courier was manufactured by Toyo Kogyo (Mazda), and imported and sold by Ford Motor Company as a response to the unforeseen popularity of the small Toyota and Nissan (Datsun) pickups among young buyers in the Western states. Like the other mini-pickups of the time, it featured a sub-2.0-liter, four-cylinder engine, a four-speed manual transmission, rear wheel drive, a load capability of 1,400 lb (635 kg), and was fairly inexpensive compared to full-size pickups of the time. To circumvent the 25 percent chicken tax on light trucks, Couriers, like Chevrolet LUVs, were imported in "cab chassis" configurations, which included the entire light truck without the cargo box or truck bed, and were only subject to a 4 percent tariff. Subsequently, a truck bed would be attached to the chassis and the vehicle could be sold as a light truck.

The body styling was effectively that of the related Mazda B series, but its frontal treatment was unique; its grille was designed to emulate that of the larger Ford F series and large, single headlights were fitted instead of the B series's smaller twin units. When the Courier was introduced, it was supplied with a 1.8-liter overhead cam engine that produced 74 hp (55 kW) at 5,070 rpm and 92 lbf⋅ft (125 N⋅m) at 3,500 rpm. A four-speed manual transmission was standard; a three-speed automatic option was also offered. A five-speed manual option was added in 1976.

Badging was changed several times in the first generation of the series. In 1972, the tailgate read "Ford Courier" in large, raised letters; there was a small "Courier" badge on the front of the hood. From 1973 until 1976, the hood badging read "Ford". In 1973, the tailgate read "Courier" in large letters, with a small "Ford" badge on the upper left. In 1974, it read "Ford" in large letters, with a small "Courier" badge on the lower right. In 1976, the cab was lengthened by 75 millimetres (3.0 in) and extra trim was added to the grille.

== Third generation (PE/UC/UD; 1977–1985) ==
Third generation
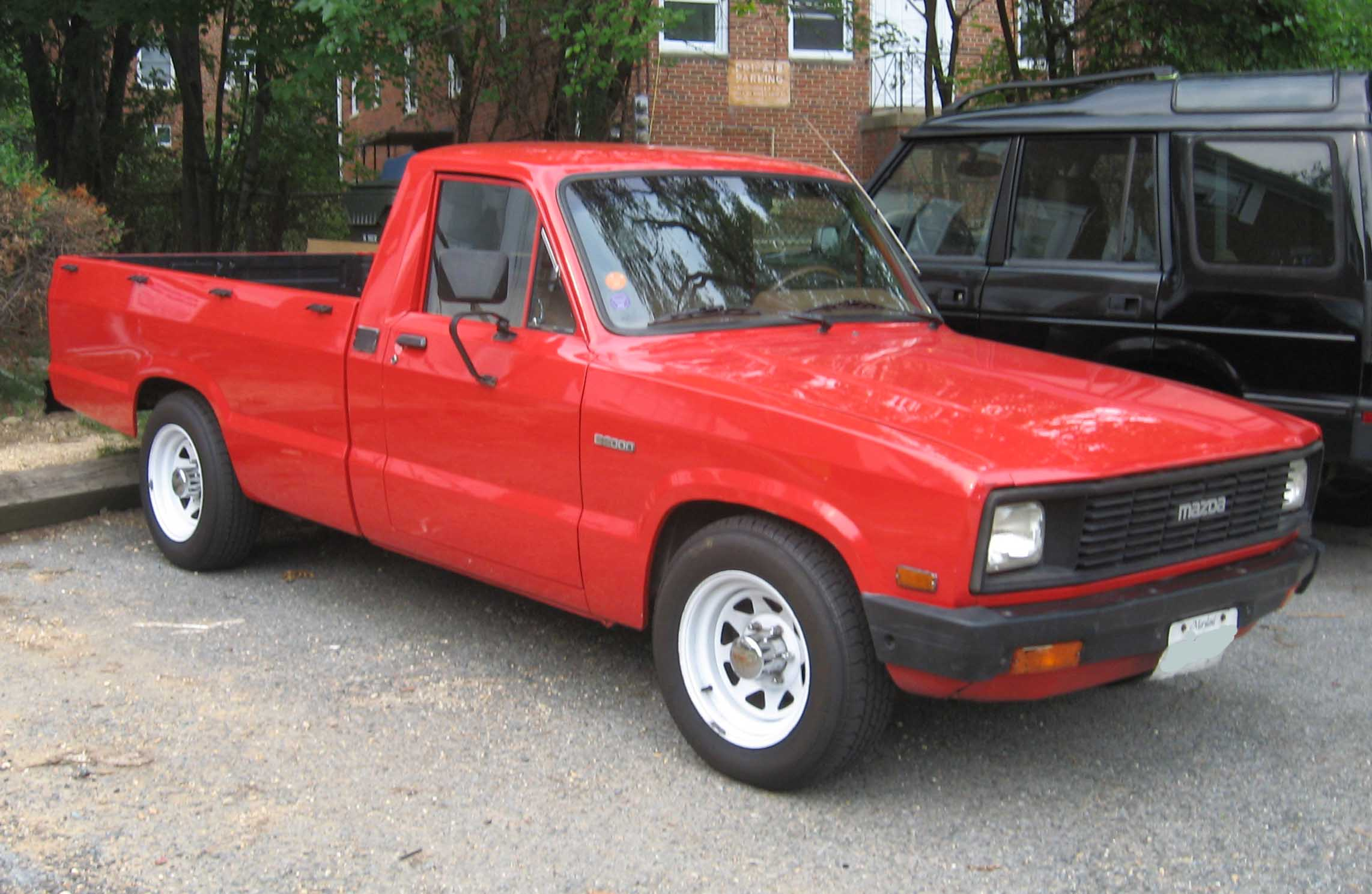
- Mazda B2000

Overview
- Also called: Ford Courier; Mazda Proceed; Bahman Cara (Iran)
- Production: April 1977–1985
- Assembly: Japan: Hiroshima; Colombia: Bogotá; Iran: Tehran (Bahman Group)

Body and chassis
- Body style: 2-door pickup, standard and long bed
- Layout: Front-engine, rear-wheel-drive

Powertrain
- Engine: gasoline: 1.6 L NA I4; 1.8 L VC I4; 1.8 L VB I4 (US); 2.0 L MA I4; 2.0 L FE I4; diesel: 2.2 L S2 I4
- Transmission: 4/5-speed manual 3-speed automatic

Dimensions
- Wheelbase: 2,715 mm (106.9 in) (SWB); 2,865 mm (112.8 in) (LWB)
- Length: 4,445 mm (175.0 in) (SWB); 4,740 mm (186.6 in) (LWB)

The model's third generation was introduced in April 1977 as the PE chassis for the Proceed 1600. The Japanese model had a claimed 71 kW (95 hp; 97 PS) and a top speed of 140 km/h (87 mph). The new model was more comfortable than the previous; it had a woodgrain dashboard and other luxuries. Outside Japan it was sold as the B1600 and later as the B1800, which was originally sold only in North America. In the US for the 1980 model year, it was sold as the B2000, which used a 2.0-liter F/MA engine, replacing the B1800. The diesel 2.2-liter B2200 was sold from 1981 with the chassis code UD (introduced during 1982 for the United States). In the US, the 1984 B2000 continued to be sold through 1985; the next generation only appeared as a "1986". The 2.0-liter version was called PE2M6/M7 until 1981—"6" for the short wheelbase, "7" for the long bed—after which it had the chassis code UC. In Japan, this truck was discontinued in October 1979 because commercial customers preferred vans over the less space-efficient, bonneted trucks.

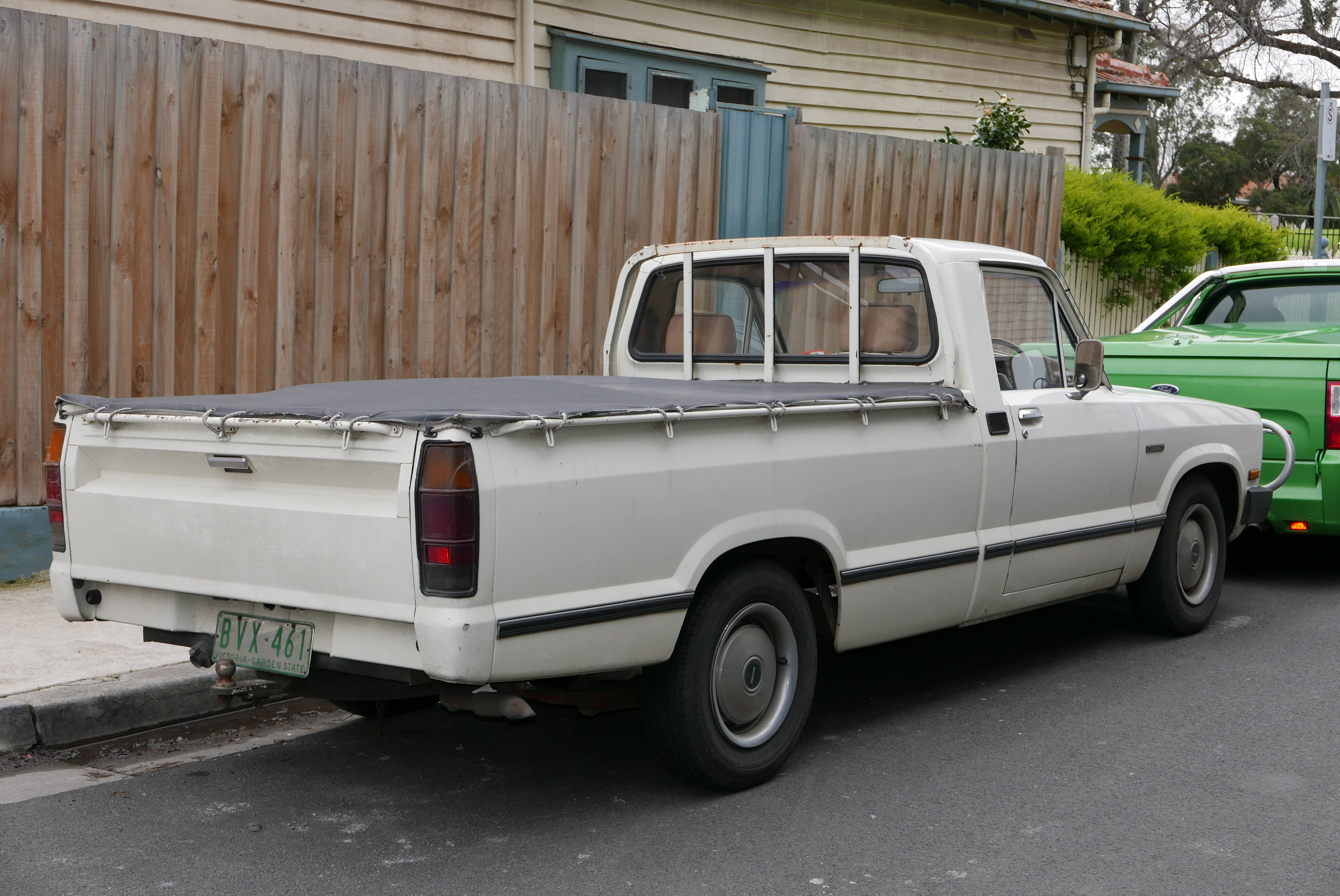
1983 Mazda B2200 (UD)

The B2000 was also available in a long-bed version with a longer wheelbase and rear overhang, which was given the model name Sundowner in some markets—a reference to nomadic Australian herders who would make camp wherever they were at sundown. The regular model code UC11 was changed to UC21 when it was fitted with a long bed. The chassis coding system was used for the US market in 1981 when a standardized VIN code was introduced. This change led to a second coding system, complicating the identification and grouping of these trucks. The B series was reskinned during 1982, with new sheetmetal below the belt line, and was replaced in January 1985. By this time, 1.8 million Mazda B-series trucks had been built since 1961.

In Australia and New Zealand, the Courier was a compact pickup truck built for Ford by Mazda in Japan. It was first offered on the Australian market in 1979. Both Mazda and Ford versions for New Zealand were assembled locally. Gulf Auto Restorations in New Zealand also built a run of double-cab Ford Couriers in 1979, long before Mazda themselves developed such a model.

Engines:

- 1977–19?? – 1.6 L (1586 cc) NA I4 (PE2N), 95 PS (70 kW; 94 hp) JIS at 5700 rpm
- 1977–1978 – 1.8 L (1769 cc) VC I4 (PE2V), 84 hp (63 kW; 85 PS) at 5000 rpm (UK)
- 1977–1979 – 1.8 L (1796 cc) VB (US only?)
- 1979–1984 – 2.0 L (1970 cc) MA I4, 56 kW (75 hp; 76 PS) (PE2M, UC)
- 1982–1984 – diesel 2.2 L (2209 cc) S2 I4, 60 PS (44 kW; 59 hp) (UD)

=== Ford Courier ===
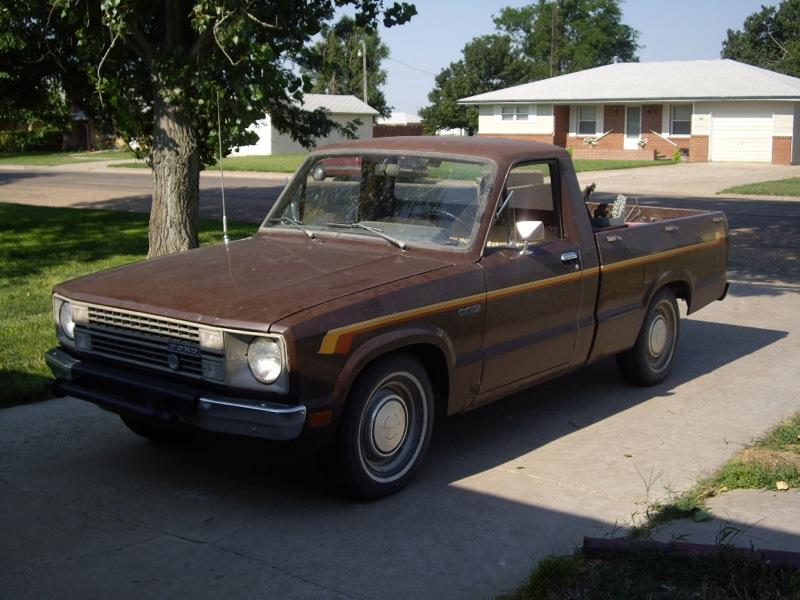
1979 Ford Courier

In 1977, the Courier was redesigned and various new options were made available. The truck was available with front disc brakes and a Ford-built 2.3-liter engine option, which was the same engine used in the Ford Pinto and Mustang II. The key feature distinguishing the Courier from Mazda's B series was the single headlights, although with park and indicator lights were placed inset starting in 1978. 1977 models retained the turn signal lights in the bumper. In 1979, the base model engine was increased in size to 2.0-liters. The optional Ford 2.3-liter engine was produced in Brazil.

The Courier was never available with a diesel engine in the US. However, the 1982 Mazda B2200 was available with the S2, a Perkins-built 4.135, 2.2-liter four-cylinder diesel engine, producing 59 hp (44 kW) at 4000 rpm. This diesel engine was also available for the 1983 and 1984 Ford Ranger; for the 1985 to 1987 Ford Rangers it was replaced with the 2.3-liter 4D55T turbo diesel.

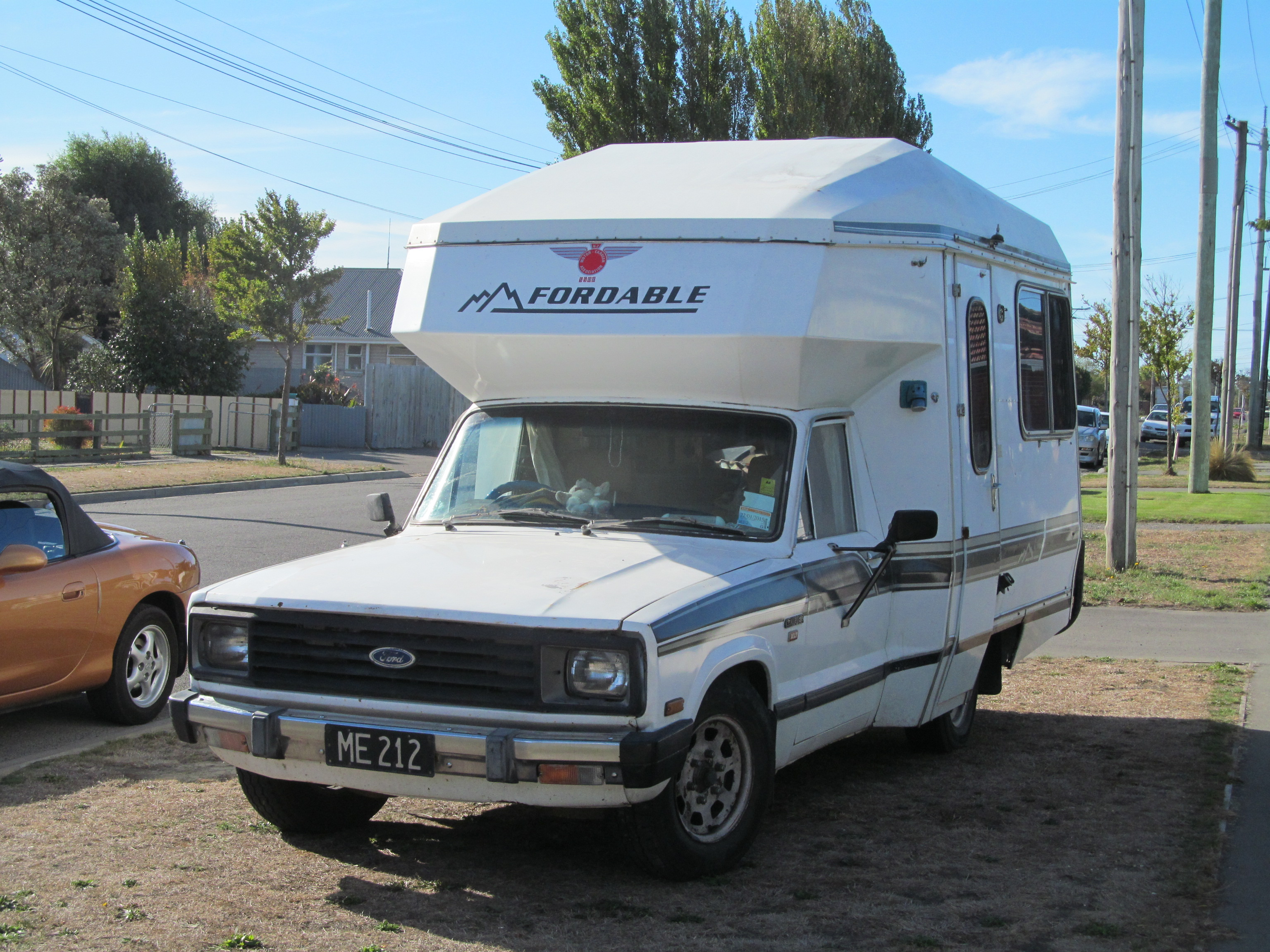
1985 Ford Courier camper (facelift, New Zealand)

The Courier continued to be sold in North America until the model year 1982, when power steering was added. For 1983, Ford of North America introduced its own Ford Ranger to fill its compact truck segment, which replaced the Courier in the US and Canadian markets. In other markets such as Australasia, this generation of Courier continued to be sold until 1985, when the next generation was introduced. Australian models were redesigned in 1982 or 1983.

==== Electric variants ====
Between 1979 and 1982, a number of electric Ford Couriers were produced. Jet Industries purchased "vehicle gliders"—Ford Courier bodies without engines, and fitted them with a series-connected direct current motor and lead-acid accumulators; they labeled the vehicles the Jet Industries ElectraVan 750. These were sold mainly as service trucks, generally to local government departments. They had a top speed of around 70 mph (113 km/h), and covered 50 to 60 miles (80 to 97 km) on a full charge. A number of these vehicles still exist, usually with upgraded motor control systems and higher-voltage battery packs.

== Fourth generation (UF; 1985–1998) ==
Fourth generation
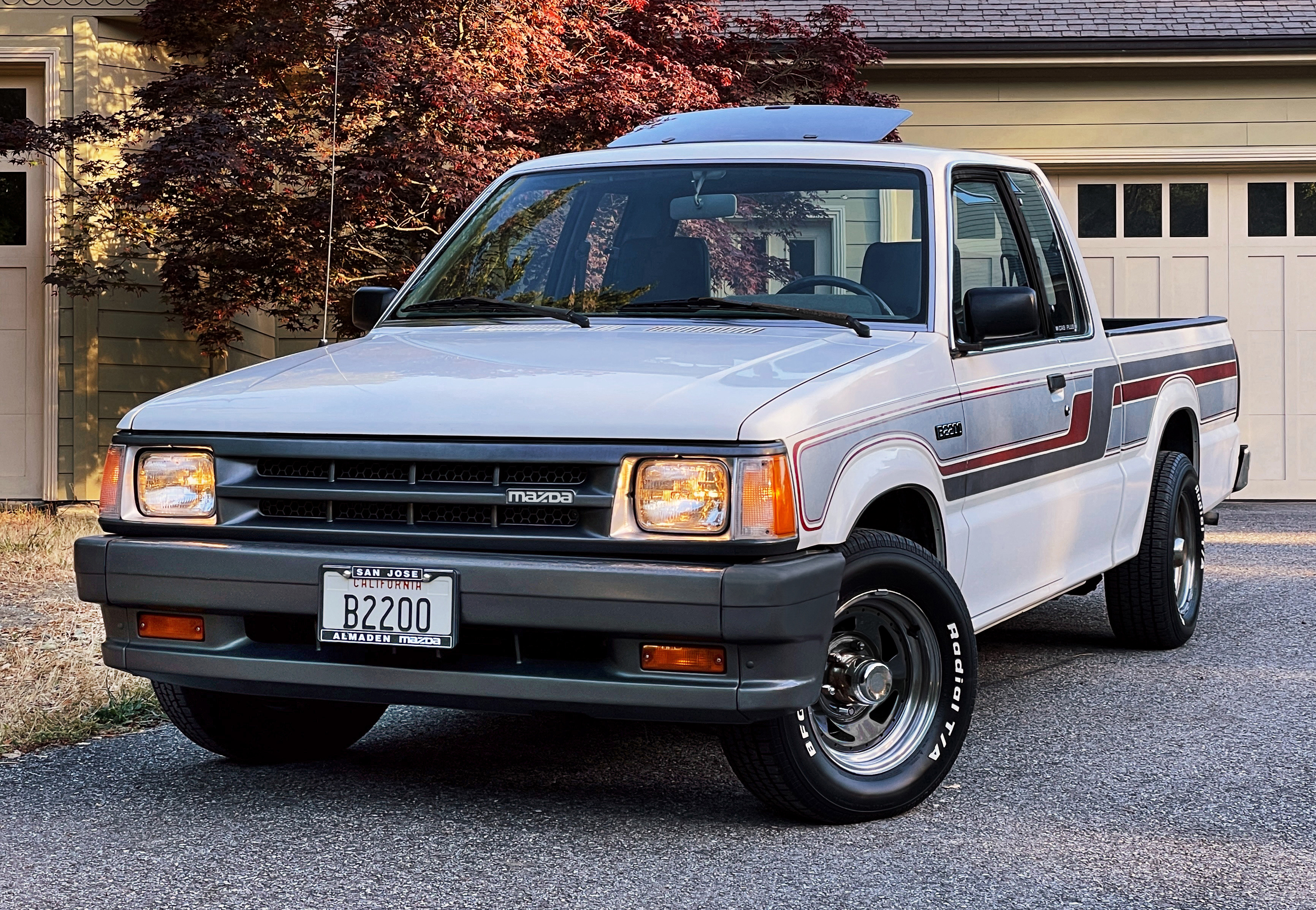
- 1989 Mazda B2200 Cab Plus (North America)

Overview
- Also called: Ford Courier (pickup); Ford Raider (wagon); Ford Marathon (Thailand); Mazda Bravo (Australia); Mazda Thunder (Thailand); Mazda Fighter (Thailand); Mazda Magnum (Thailand); Mazda Proceed; Forta FZ1022 FR/BL/YB FR (space-cab)/SA FL (dual-cab)/Forta FZ5020 BR/5020XXYSA FL/FZ6491 (China)
- Production: 1985–1998
- Assembly: Japan: Hiroshima (Hiroshima Plant); Colombia: Bogotá; Australia: Campbellfield, Victoria (Ford Australia; Ford Marathon); Philippines: Las Piñas (Francisco Motors Corporation); South Africa: Pretoria; Zimbabwe: Willowvale (Willowvale Motor Industries); China: Fuzhou (Forta)

Body and chassis
- Body style: 2-door pickup 2-door pickup (extended cab); 4-door pickup 5-door wagon
- Layout: Front-engine, rear-wheel-drive Front-engine, four-wheel-drive
- Related: Mazda Proceed Marvie

Powertrain
- Engine: petrol: 2.0 L FE I4; 2.2 L F2 I4; 2.6 L G54B I4 (Mitsubishi); 2.6 L G6 I4; diesel: 2.2 L R2 I4; 2.5 L WL-T td I4; 2.5 L 4JA1 I4 (Isuzu)
- Transmission: 5-speed 2WD B2600 R5M-D manual 5-speed 2WD B2000/B2200 M5M-D manual 5-speed 4WD B2600 R5MX-D manual 4-speed N4A-HL Hydraulic Controlled Automatic; 4-speed R4AX-EL Electronically Controlled Automatic

Dimensions
- Wheelbase: 108.7 in (2,761 mm); 117.5 in (2,984 mm); 109.3 in (2,776 mm); 118.1 in (3,000 mm) 124.3 in (3,157 mm) (Tianqi Thunder Vigo)
- Length: 182.7 in (4,641 mm); 196.8 in (4,999 mm); 198.8 in (5,050 mm)
- Width: 65.7 in (1,669 mm); 67.1 in (1,704 mm); 69.3 in (1,760 mm) (Tianqi Thunder Vigo)
- Height: 61.8 in (1,570 mm); 61.6 in (1,565 mm); 66.1 in (1,679 mm); 65.9 in (1,674 mm)

Chronology
- Successor: Ford Everest (for Raider)

A new Proceed/B series (UF) was introduced in January 1985; it was produced until June 1999. A five-speed manual transmission was the primary choice in most markets, with options of a four-speed automatic transmission option and part-time four wheel drive. The 2.6-liter, Mitsubishi-powered B2600 was added in 1986. 1987 saw the Mazda inline-four engine upgraded to 2.2-liters in the B2200; the smaller engine was phased out of the North American markets after that year. In 1988, the Mitsubishi engine was replaced with a new family of Mazda powerplants. This generation also returned to the Japanese market as the "Proceed" in 1990, where it was marketed mostly as a "lifestyle" truck and only in a single layout (4WD, gasoline-engined Cab Plus).

From 1991, an SUV/RV version of this generation was manufactured and sold as the Proceed Marvie; this was sold as the Ford Raider in Australia. The Proceed Marvie had a UV chassis code. It had three rows of seats, with the rearmost accessible by walking past the second row on the left. A similar version of the vehicle was developed in Thailand, where it was sold as a version of the Mazda B series. In 1988, the larger Mitsubishi carbureted engine was replaced with Mazda's more powerful, 2.6-liter, four-cylinder, fuel-injected engine. The new model was named B2600i—"i" for injection. Both Mazda B series and the Ford Courier versions were assembled from CKD kits in New Zealand. The New Zealand lineup started with the 2.2 diesel with 47 kW (64 PS), with the petrol 2.2 offering 77 kW (105 PS) and the fuel injected 2.6 92 kW (125 PS).

In South Africa, South African Motor Corporation (SAMCOR)—now Ford SA—fitted the B series with the 3.0- and later the 3.4-liter Ford Essex V6 as a range-topping engine option. The Essex engine was produced at Ford's Struandale engine plant in Port Elizabeth. In Zimbabwe, the B series was assembled at the Willowvale Mazda Motor Industry plant in Willowvale, Harare, where it was fitted with the 1.6 and 1.8-liter engines.

Engine options:

- B2000
  - 1985–1987 – 2.0 L (1998 cc) FE I4, 80 hp (60 kW) (North America) - 90 PS (66 kW) (Europe)
- B2200
  - 1985–1989 – 2.2 L (2184 cc) R2 diesel I4, 64 PS (47 kW), 105 lb⋅ft (142 N⋅m)
  - 1987–1993 – 2.2 L (2184 cc) F2 I4, 85 hp (63 kW), 118 lb⋅ft (160 N⋅m) (Carb, North America)
  - 1992–1993 – 2.2 L (2184 cc) F2 I4, 91 hp (68 kW), 118 lb⋅ft (160 N⋅m) (EFI, California spec)
- B2500 (Thailand)
  - 1989–1997 – 2.5 L (2499 cc) 4JA1 I4, 90 hp (67 kW), 128 lb⋅ft (174 N⋅m)
  - 1997–2002 – 2.5 L (2499 cc) WL I4, 94 hp (70 kW), 126 lb⋅ft (171 N⋅m)
- B2600
  - 1986–1988 – 2.6 L (2555 cc) G54B I4, 102 hp (76 kW), 146 lb⋅ft (198 N⋅m)
- B2600i
  - 1989–1993 – 2.6 L (2606 cc) G6 I4, 121 hp (90 kW), 149 lb⋅ft (202 N⋅m) (North America)

92 kW (125 PS) at 4600 rpm in Australia

- B3000 (South Africa)
  - 1993–1997 – 3.0 L (2993 cc) Essex V6 89 kW (121 PS; 119 hp)
- B3400 (South Africa)
  - 1997–2000 – 3.4 L (3376 cc) Essex V6 108 kW (147 PS; 145 hp)

=== North America ===
Upon its North American debut in 1985 for the 1986 model year, the B2000 was praised by automotive critics for its comfortable ride, smooth handling, and general car-like feel despite its ability to perform tasks required of a truck. In addition to the standard cab which was available with a short bed or long bed, Mazda offered an extended cab version with jump seats called the Cab Plus.

For three consecutive years (1986, 1987, 1988), Mazda trucks were rated number one in overall customer satisfaction by J.D. Power and Associates.

==== Models ====
For the 1986 model year, the only available models were the B2000 (only available in 4x2) and the B2600 4x4. The latter model was powered with a 2.6-liter Mitsubishi-sourced carbureted motor.

The B2200 was introduced as a replacement for the B2000 in 1987, and the B2000 was discontinued after the 1987 model year. For the 1989 model year, the B2600 was given a Mazda G6 fuel-injected engine and was renamed the B2600i. At this point, the B2600i became available either in 4x4 or 4x2, alongside the B2200 which remained only available as a 4x2. All B2600i models were equipped with a different hood with a distinct center bulge to accommodate the larger motor. The B2600 4x4 and subsequent B2600i 4x4 models had their own styling distinctions such as fender flares, a wider front bumper, and mud guards.

==== Trim levels ====
For the 1986–89 model years, there were three trim levels available in North America: base, SE-5, and LX. For the 1990–93 model years, the LX trim level was renamed the LE-5.

The base model was a utilitarian vehicle and featured no amenities. The standard cab came standard with breathable vinyl upholstery, full brushed-nap carpeting, and steel wheels with blackwall radial tires. The Cab Plus base model came standard with body side pinstripes, swing-out rear side windows, checkered tweed reclining bucket seats, full cut-pile carpeting, a sports-type moulded shifter boot, a remote fuel-filler door release, and a storage box for jack and tools.

The SE-5 was marketed as the sporty trim level, with standard features including dual large black 'tow' mirrors, a black rear step bumper, full cut-pile carpeting, AM/FM stereo, white and black painted spoked wheels with white-letter Bridgestone SF Radial tires, and a prominent stripe kit.

The LX was the top-of-the-line trim level, and marketed as a luxury truck. It came standard with chrome trim all around, driver's lumbar support adjustment, herringbone tweed upholstery, fully upholstered door panels with lower door carpeting and map pockets, full cut-pile carpeting, day/night rearview mirror, passenger sun visor vanity mirror, 'headlamps on' warning buzzer, windshield washer fluid level warning light, locking glove box, wrapped steering wheel, AM/FM stereo, tachometer, temperature gauge, digital quartz clock, tinted glass, sliding rear window, dual black mirrors, body side mouldings, pinstripes, a black rear step bumper, chrome spoked wheels with white-letter Bridgestone SF Radial tires.

For an additional $650 option (1986 price), LX model buyers could opt for the Convenience Package, which added an electronic tuning AM/FM radio and cassette player with four speakers, power steering, tilt steering wheel, cruise control, halogen headlamps, and two-tone paint (initially available in Dover White/Sunset Wine, Sparkling Black/Sunbeam Silver, Ondo Blue/Tornado Silver, and later available in Bayside Blue/Caspian Blue, Sunbeam Silver/Caspian Blue, and Brilliant Black/Sunbeam Silver).

==== Appearance ====
Although the North American Mazda B series remained largely unchanged throughout its eight-year run, there were minor cosmetic refreshes. For instance, 1986 was the only model year when models had a small chrome and white "maᴢᴅa" emblem on its grille. For the 1987 model year, it was replaced with a larger painted plastic piece to match the colors of the grille itself. This remained unchanged throughout the remainder of the B series' run.

The 1986–87 B2000 featured a tailgate with a large "maᴢᴅa" logo stamped into the center; all other models featured a flat tailgate with a smaller Mazda decal applied to the lower right corner.

The 1990 model year saw the first major refresh in the B series: the front bumper and grille, which had been painted a dark metallic satin grey with light grey headlight bezels, were changed to black with light grey headlight bezels. Also for 1990, the wheels for the B2600i 4x4 SE-5 were changed from chrome to a new alloy design. For the 1991 model year, the LE-5 4x2 models also received alloy wheels.

In the SE-5, the most noticeable yearly changes were the gradual disappearance of its stripes. The 1986 SE-5 model featured a stripe kit that covered a large portion of the body (running along the waistline of the front fenders and doors, and along the shoulder of the bed), with bold lines separating a monochrome color scheme and reading "SE-5" in front of the taillights (written either in black or white). The 1987 SE-5's stripes were reduced to a more subtle set of lines running along the body's waistline and swinging upwards towards the taillights where they read "SE-5" (this variant of stripes was available in either a dark blue/yellow/medium blue/light blue color scheme or a dark grey/red-orange/medium grey/light grey color scheme). The 1989 SE-5 featured a less prominent gradient-style stripe kit that started from the waistline of the doors and ran across towards the taillights. This variant remained mostly unchanged until the end of the B series' run in 1993.

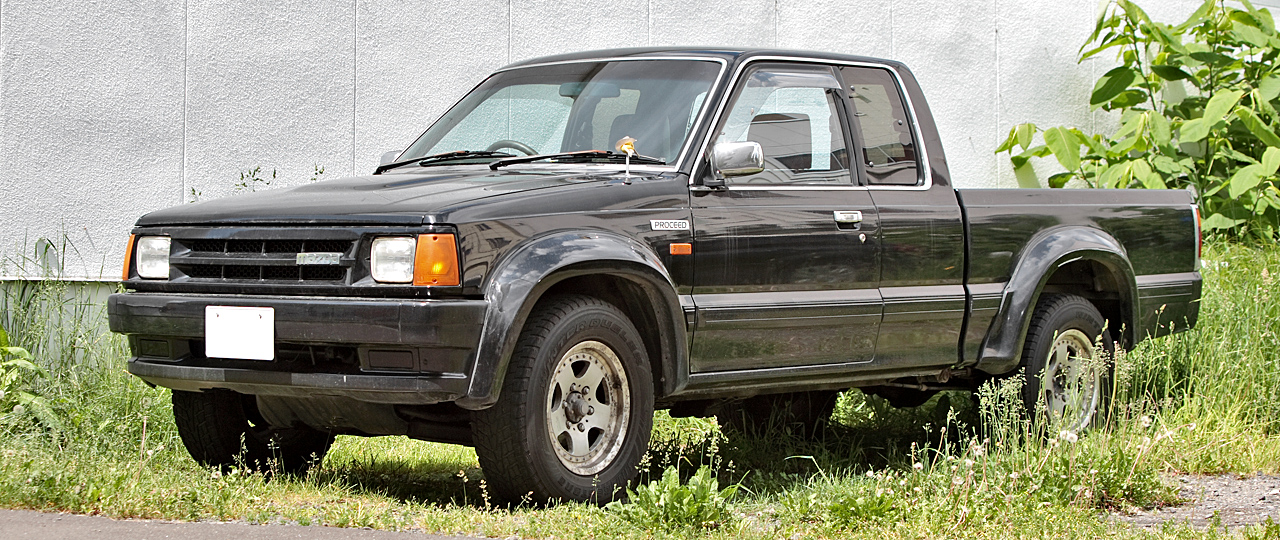
Mazda Proceed pickup (pre-facelift; Japan)

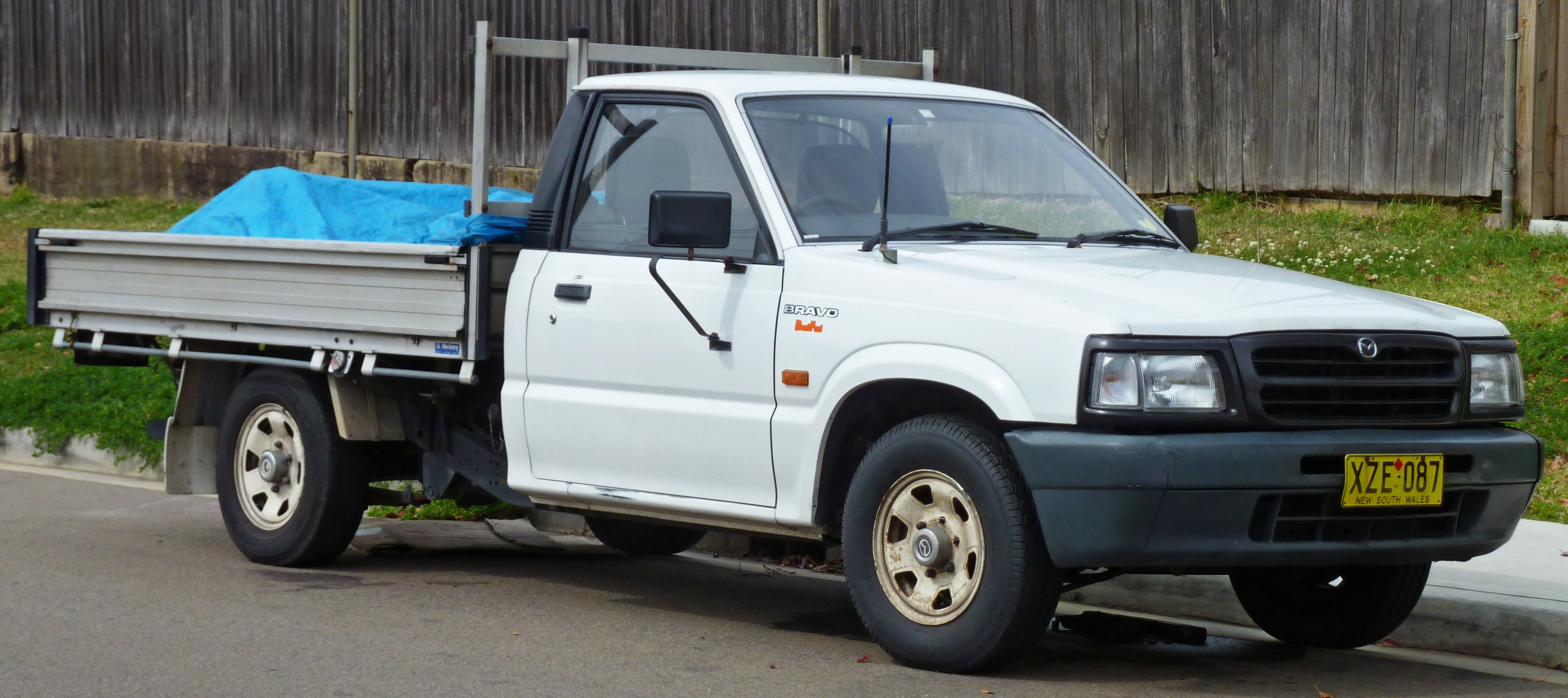
Mazda Bravo (facelift)

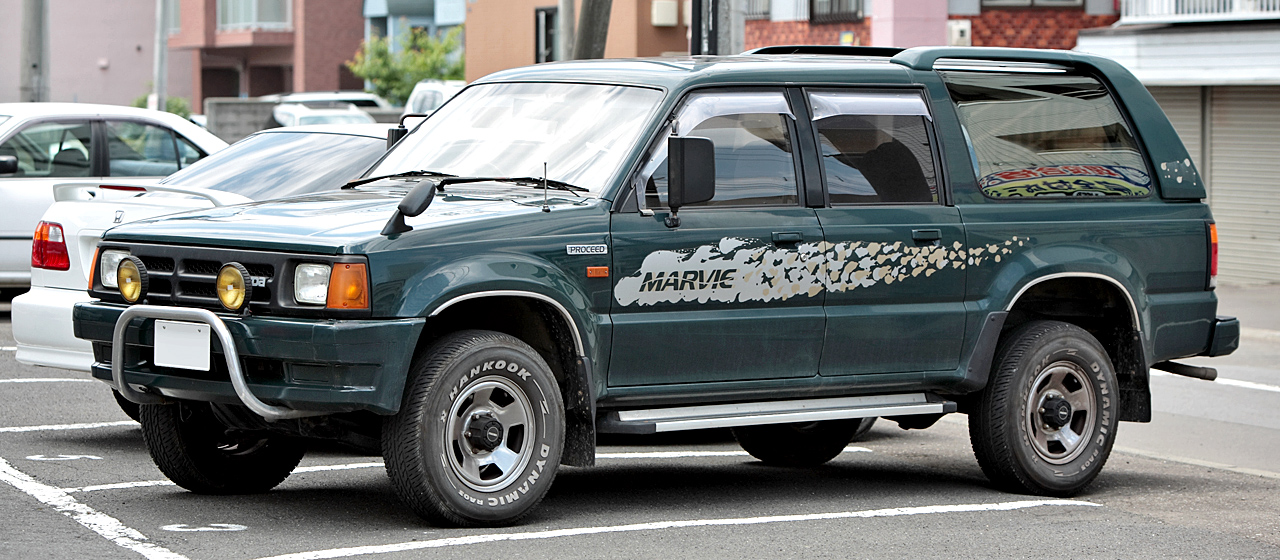
Mazda Proceed Marvie (pre-facelift; Japan)

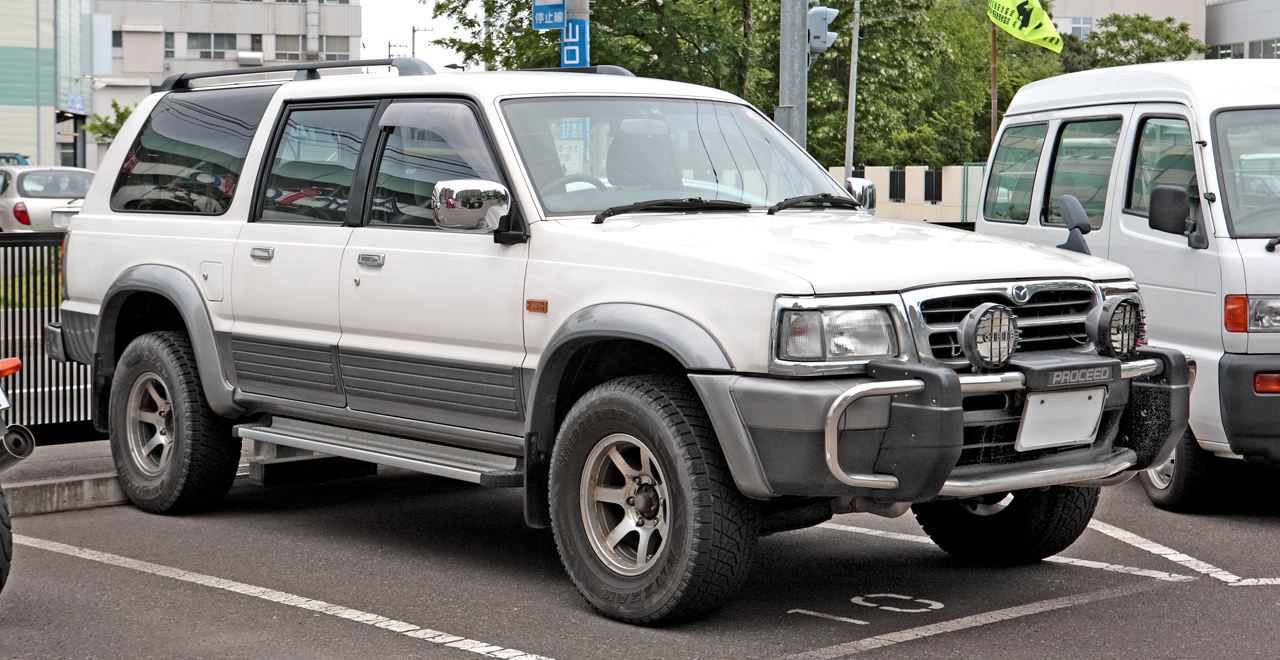
Mazda Proceed Marvie (facelift; Japan)

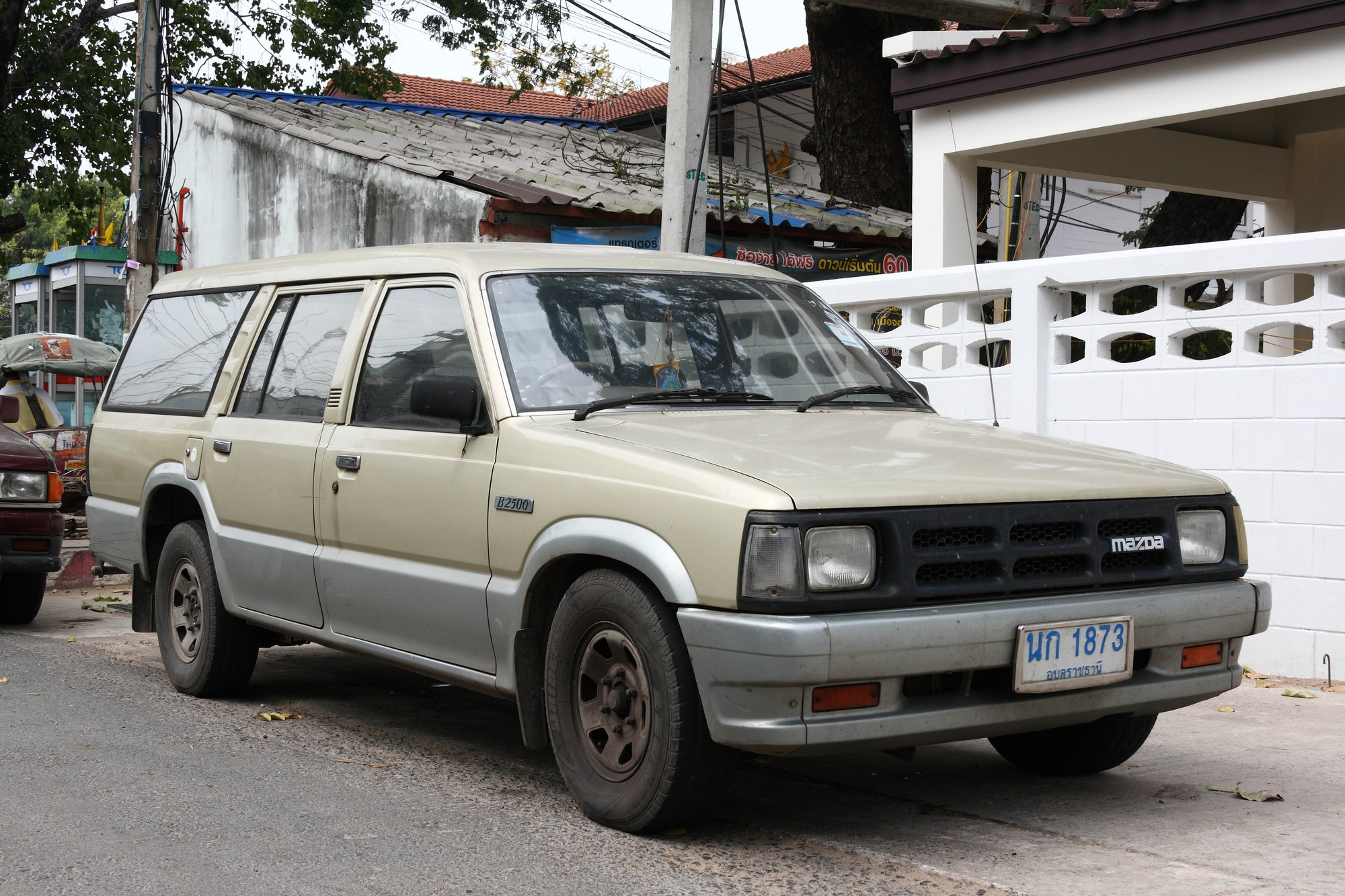
Mazda B2500 wagon (Thailand)

==== End of production ====
For the North American markets, Mazda spent more than US$100 million to design and develop the 1986–1993 B-series trucks to meet consumer demands. Partway through the 1994 model year, beginning in limited markets in June and expanding to the whole country in September, Mazda introduced a rebadged version of the Ford Ranger. This was done to save costs related to the Chicken tax; the truck was produced at Ford's Twin Cities Assembly Plant in Minnesota and at Edison Assembly in New Jersey. Because of declining sales and a lack of significant updates to its parent platform, the Ford-built B series was discontinued after the 2009 model year. The North American Ranger was discontinued at the end of 2011 with the closure of the Twin Cities plant.

=== China ===
In China, the fourth generation Mazda B series is produced by the Fuzhou Automobile Works in Fujian province as a single cab called the Forta FZ1022, a space cab called the FZ1022YB, and a crew cab called the Forta FZ1022SA. A Mazda Proceed Marvie variant is sold as the Forta FZ5020 and FZ6491. Other variants include restyled 2-door SUV versions called the FZ5020X (single cab) and FZ5020XYB (space cab), and more heavy duty pickup variants including lifted variants and dually variants with designations starting with FZ1031. The Fuzhou Automobile Works sold vehicles under the Forta, or originally Fuda (name combining Fuzhou and Mazda) brand.

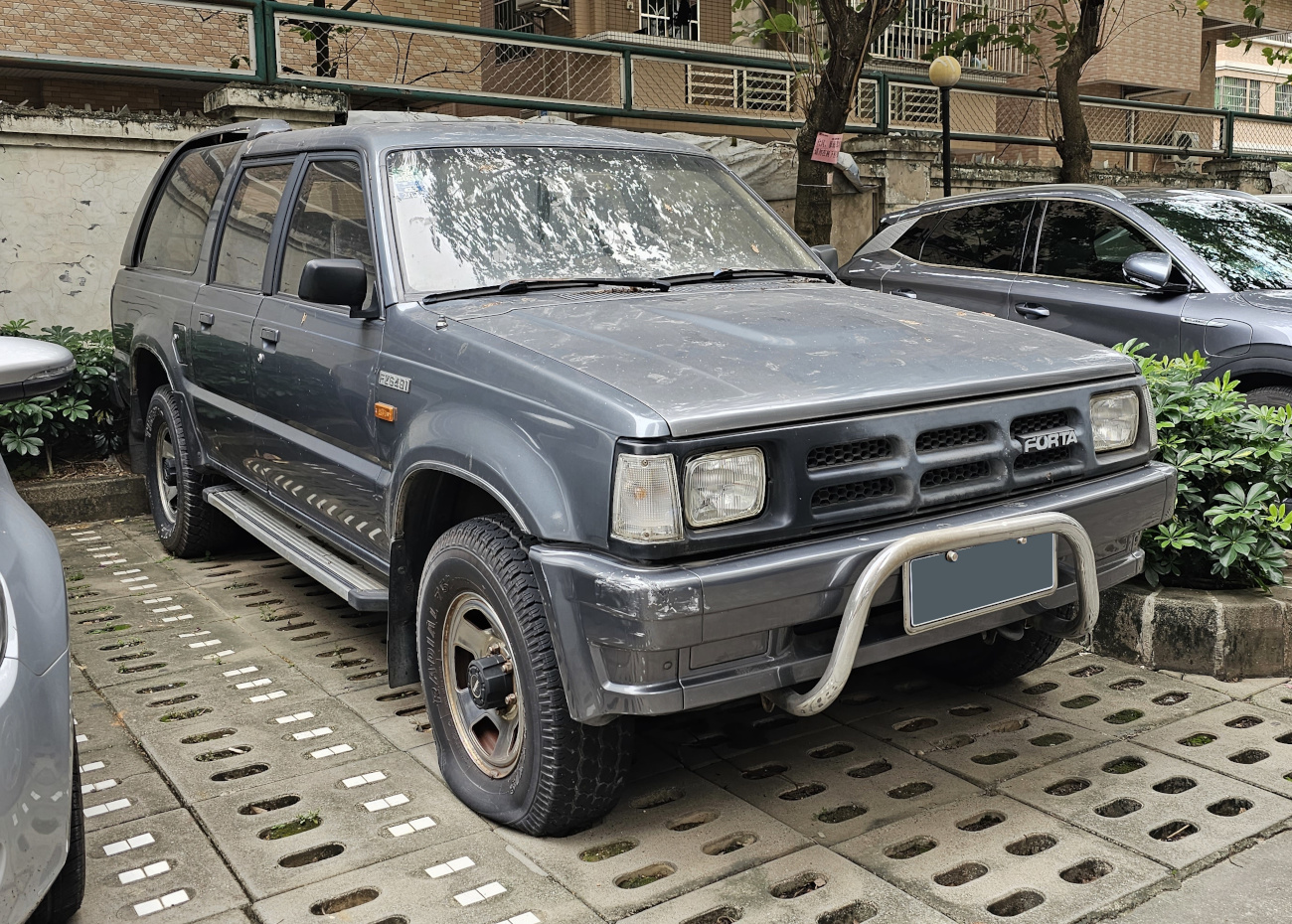
Forta FZ6491

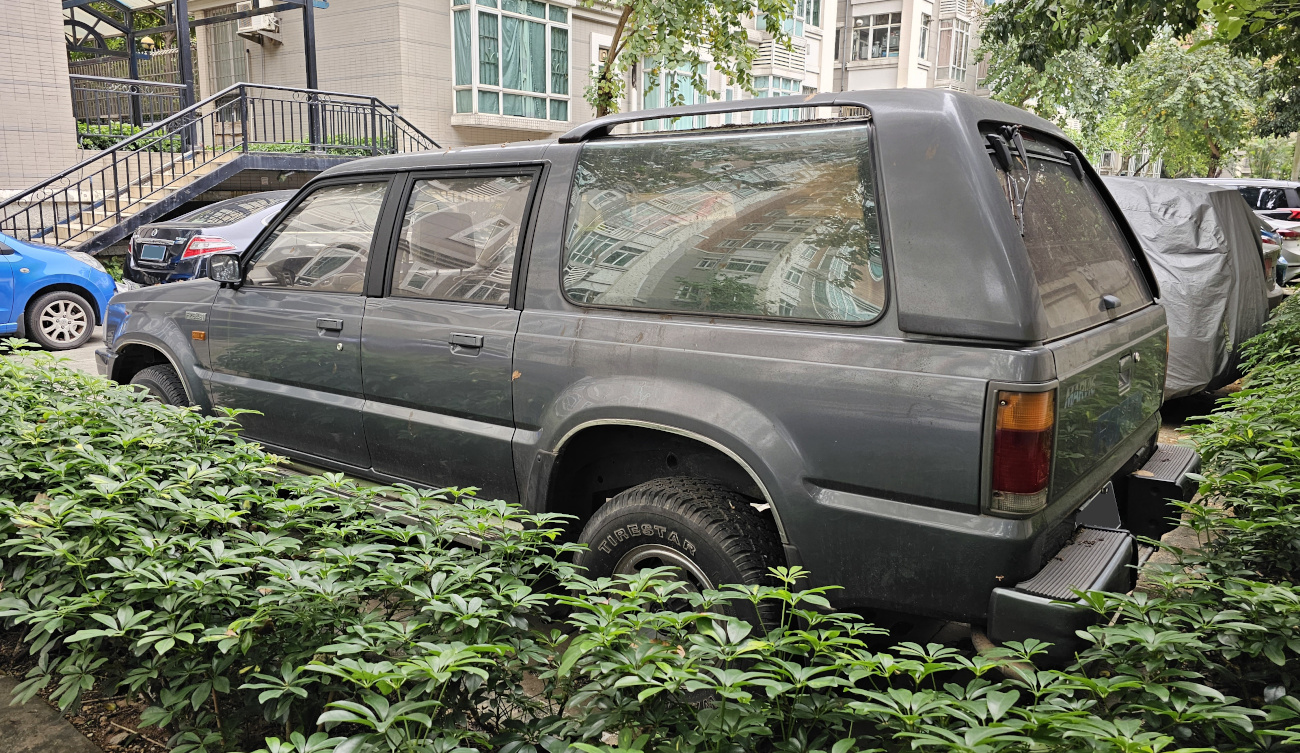
Forta FZ6491 (rear)

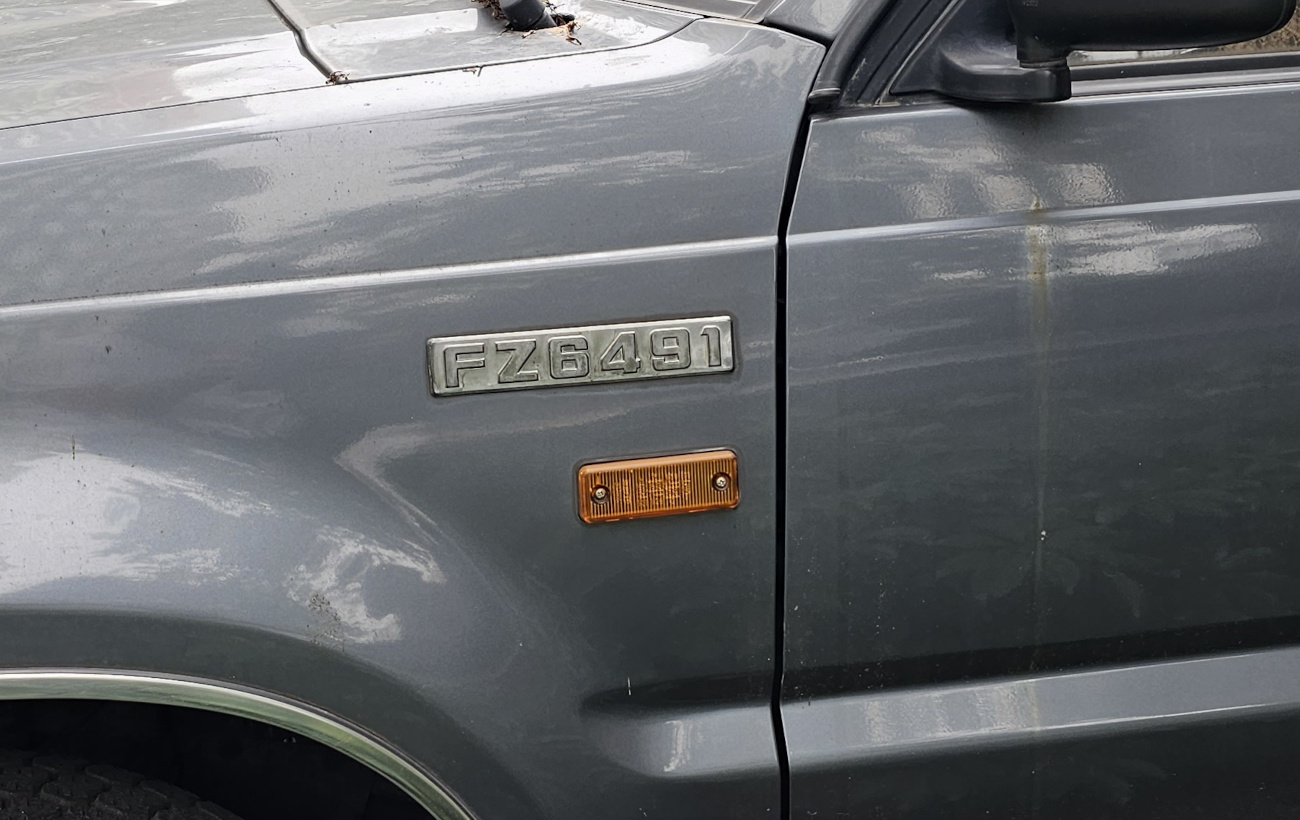
Forta FZ6491 (badge)

=== Ford Courier / Raider ===
From 1991 to 1997 a badge-engineered version of the Mazda Proceed Marvie wagon was sold as the Ford Raider. Like the Mazda version, it was an SUV/MPV based on the Proceed/B-Series/Ranger/Courier.

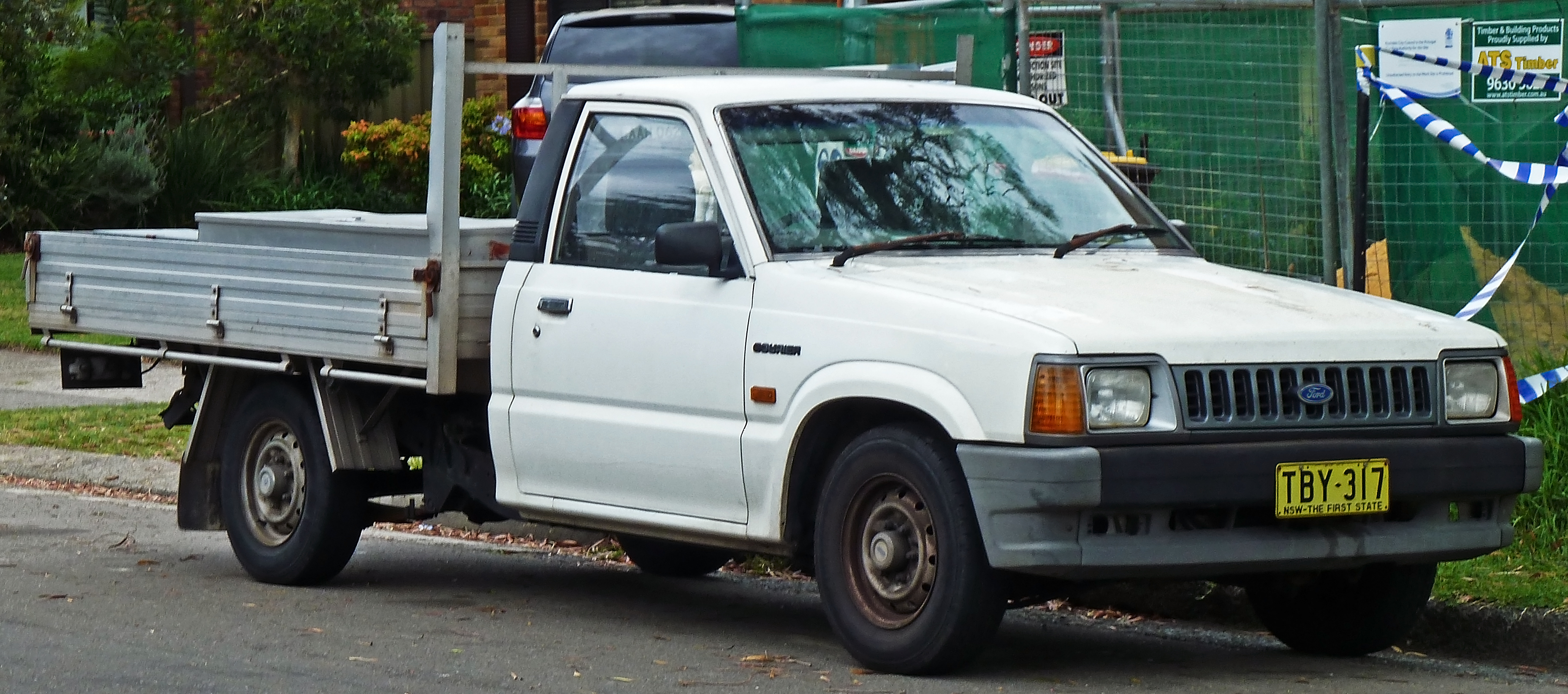
Ford Courier (pre-facelift)

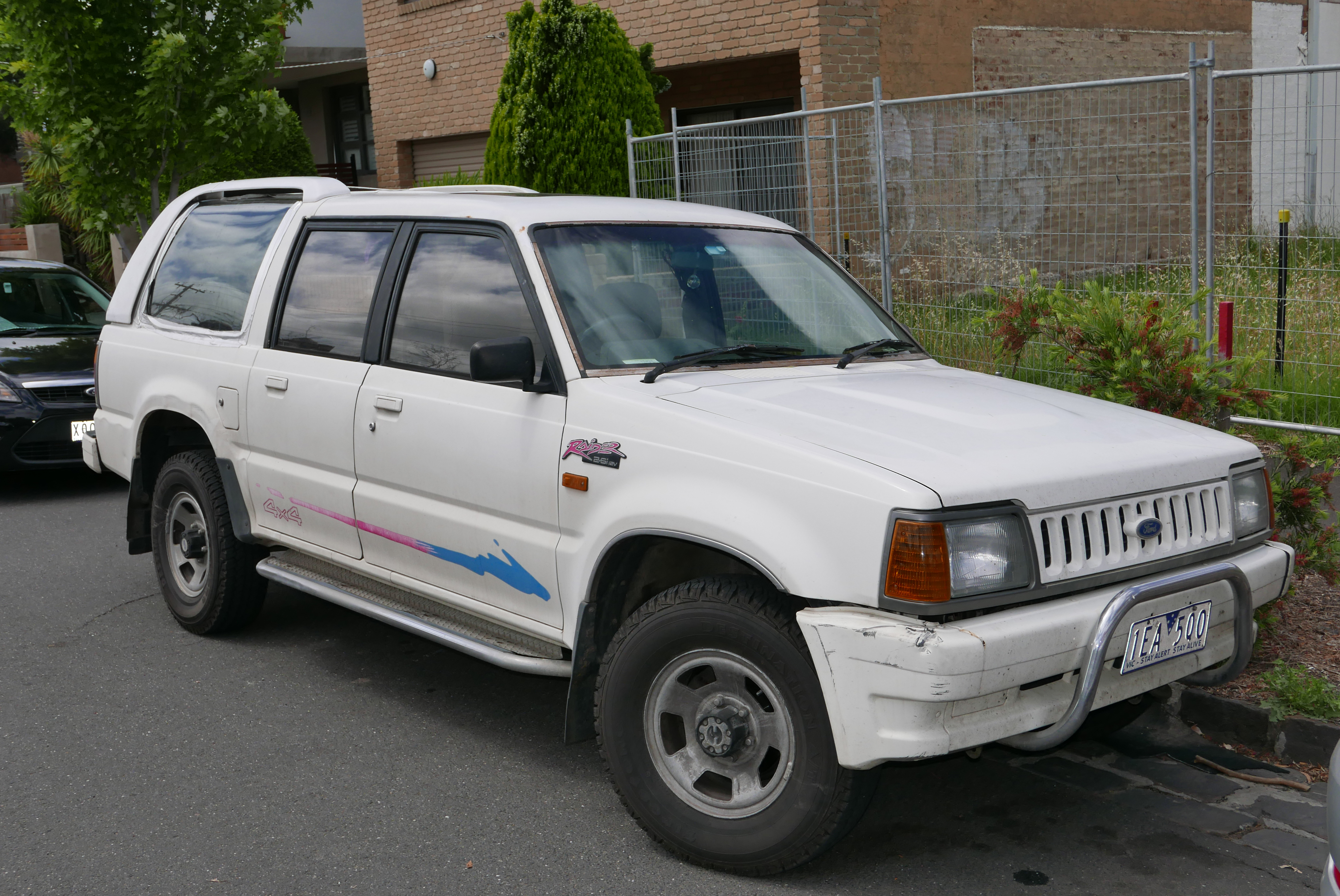
Ford Raider (Australia)

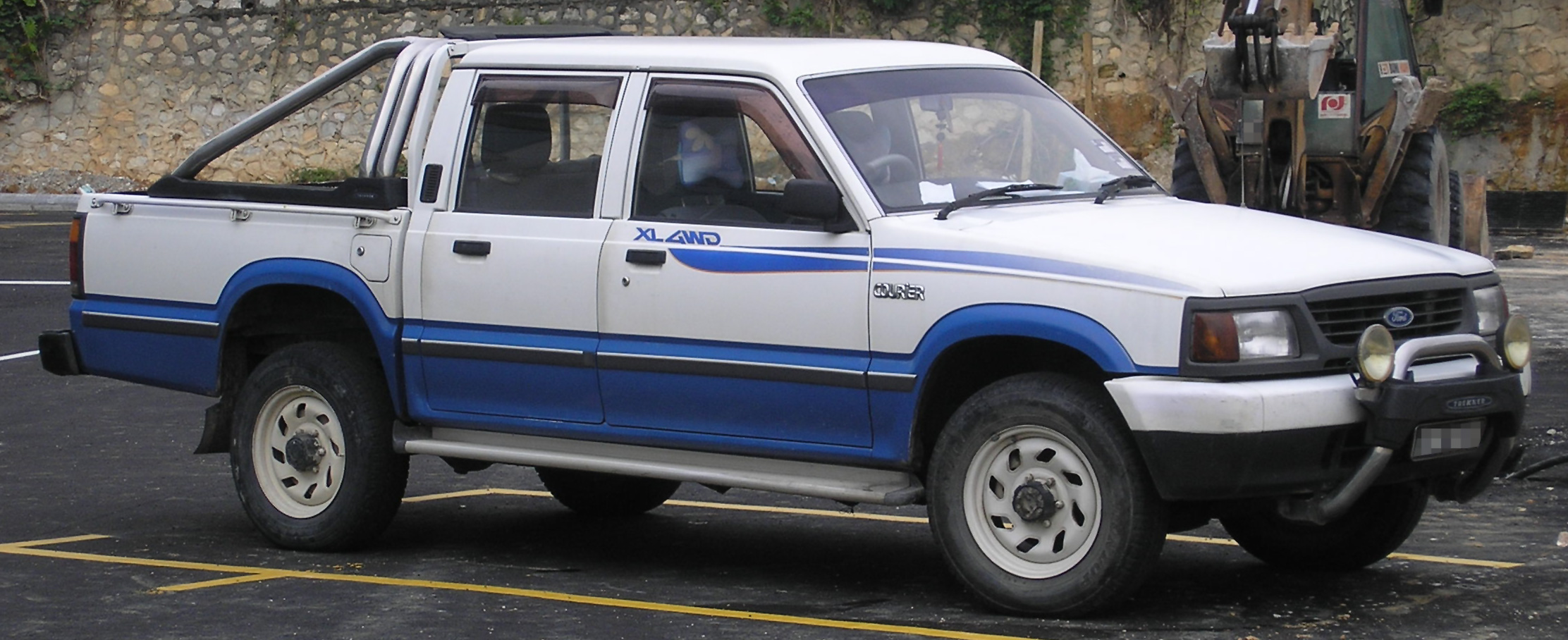
Ford Courier (facelift)

== Fifth generation (UN; 1998–2006) ==
Fifth generation
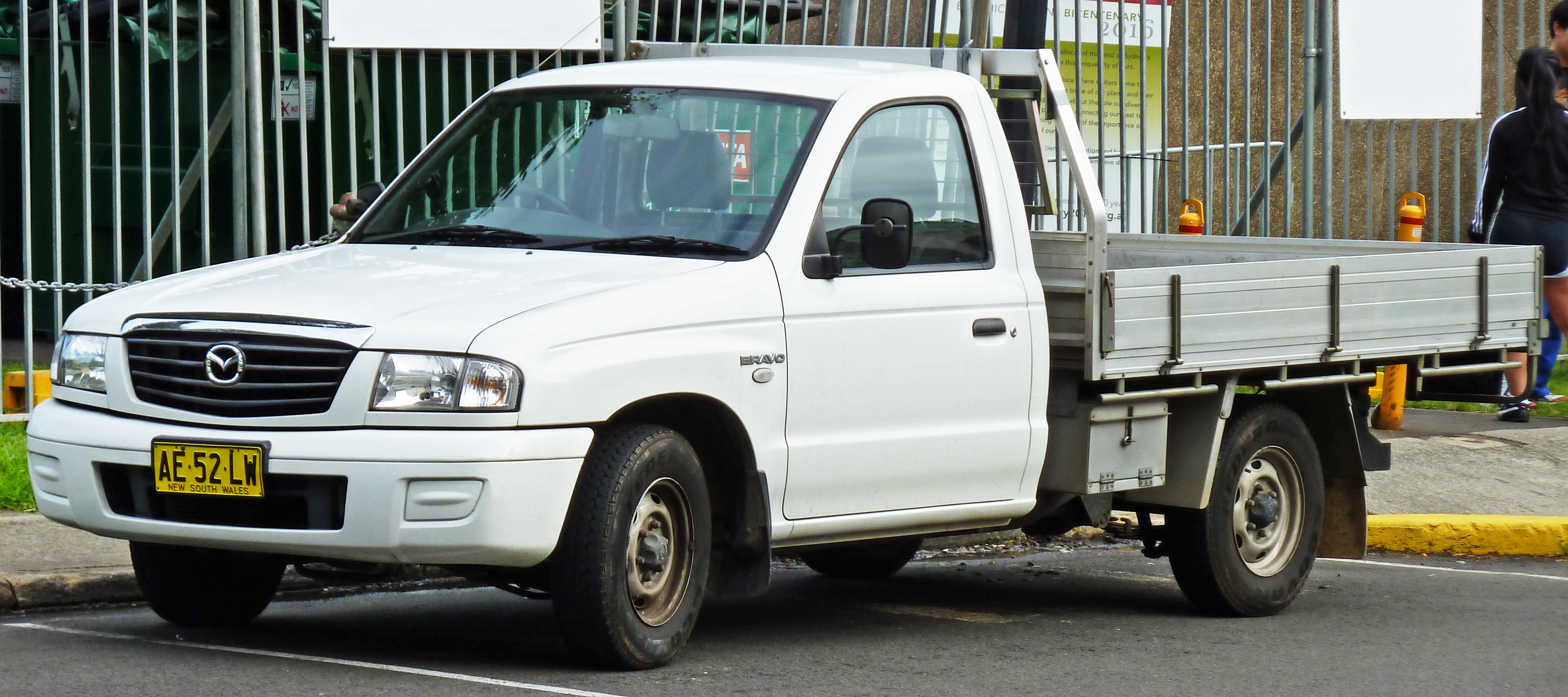

Overview
- Also called: Mazda Bravo (Australia); Mazda Fighter; Mazda Proceed
- Production: 1998–2006
- Assembly: Thailand: Rayong (AAT); Colombia: Bogotá; Philippines: Santa Rosa, Laguna; South Africa: Pretoria; Vietnam: Hai Duong (Ford Vietnam); Zimbabwe: Willowvale (Willowvale Motor Industries)

Body and chassis
- Body style: 2-door pickup 2-door pickup (extended cab); 4-door "Freestyle" pickup (suicide rear doors); 4-door pickup
- Layout: Front-engine, rear-wheel-drive Front-engine, four-wheel-drive
- Related: Ford Ranger/Courier (PE/PG/PH); Ford Everest (first generation)

Powertrain
- Engine: Petrol engines: 2.2 L F2 I4; 2.6 L G6E I4; 4.0 L Cologne SOHC V6 (2005-06, Australia); Diesel engines: 2.5 L WL I4; 2.5 L WL-T turbo I4; 2.9 L W9 I4
- Transmission: 4-speed automatic 5-speed automatic (4.0 V6 models only); 5-speed manual

Dimensions
- Wheelbase: 2,985 mm (117.5 in) (2WD); 3,000 mm (118 in) (4WD)
- Length: 4,998 mm (196.8 in) (without rear step bumper and licence plate holder); 5,005 mm (197.0 in) (with licence plate holder); 5,128 mm (201.9 in) (with rear step bumper); 5,135 mm (202.2 in) (with rear step bumper and licence plate holder)
- Width: 1,695 mm (66.7 in) (without rear wheel arch extensions); 1,750 mm (68.9 in) (with rear arch wheel extensions)
- Height: 1,615 mm (63.6 in) (2WD, Single Cab & Stretch Cab); 1,625 mm (64.0 in) (2WD, Double Cab); 1,740 mm (68.5 in) (4WD, Single Cab & Stretch Cab); 1,750 mm (68.9 in) (4WD, Double Cab)
- Curb weight: 1,333 kg (2,939 lb)

In the 1998 model year, Mazda renewed its B series for international markets. Production at the AutoAlliance Thailand plant began in May 1998. It has the chassis code "UN". This model was also sold as the Ford Ranger in Europe and Asia and as the Ford Courier in Australia and New Zealand. Production also began that year at the Ford Motor Company Philippines plant. CKD versions were also assembled in South Africa and Ecuador. In March 2002 a 2892 cc (2.9-liter) version of the naturally aspirated 2.5-liter diesel engine was also developed and sold in "general markets" and the Gulf States as the B2900.

The truck was sold in more than 130 countries under a variety of names. It was called the Fighter and Ranger in Southeast Asia—except in Singapore where it was called the Proceed—the Mazda Bounty and Ford Courier in New Zealand, the Mazda Bravo in Australia, and the Mazda Drifter in South Africa. The B2600/B2200s sold in Venezuela and nearby Latin American countries were assembled in Colombia by Compañía Colombiana Automotriz S.A. (CCA). They had a 2.6-liter inline-four engine, four-wheel-drive model and an entry-level model with a 2.2-liter inline-four with rear-wheel-drive. In 2002, a "Freestyle" model with rear suicide doors became available on this platform. The rest of the range was revised in 2002 and 2004. These models are unrelated to the Mazda B-series and Ford Ranger models in North America.

In Australia, in January 2005, the Courier received a 4.0 V6. It was available in GL (Super Cab and Double Cab) and XLT (Double Cab only) trims. The B series was released in September 2005, with the B4000 Bravo DX (Dual Cab only), DX+ (Freestyle and Dual Cab) and SDX (Freestyle and Dual Cab) trims being available.

There were two fuel tank sizes available. For the 2WD Stretch Cab and Dual Cab, the fuel tank size is 63 L. For all 4WD models (and the 2WD Regular Cab), the fuel tank size is 70 L.

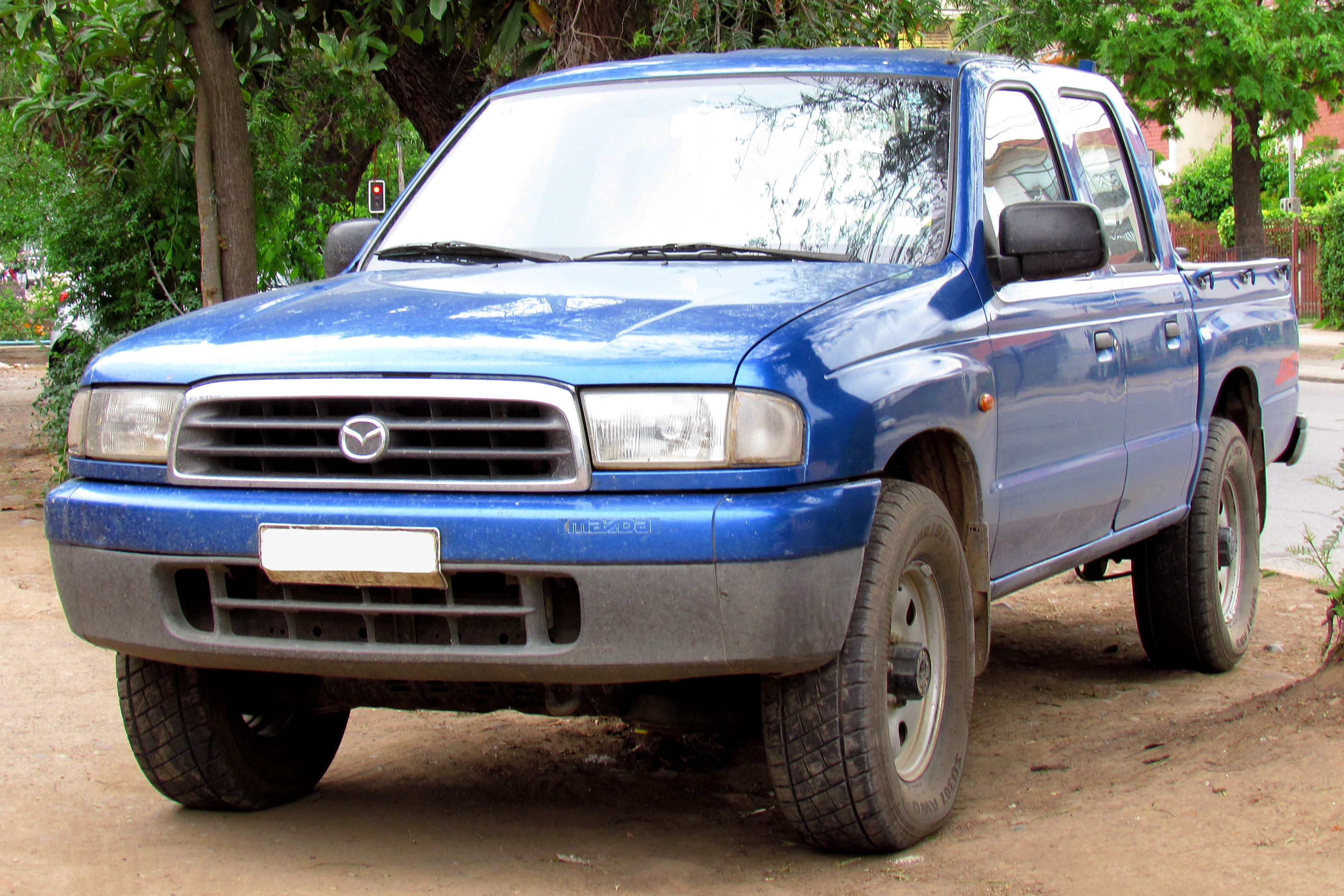
Mazda B2500 (Chile, pre-facelift)

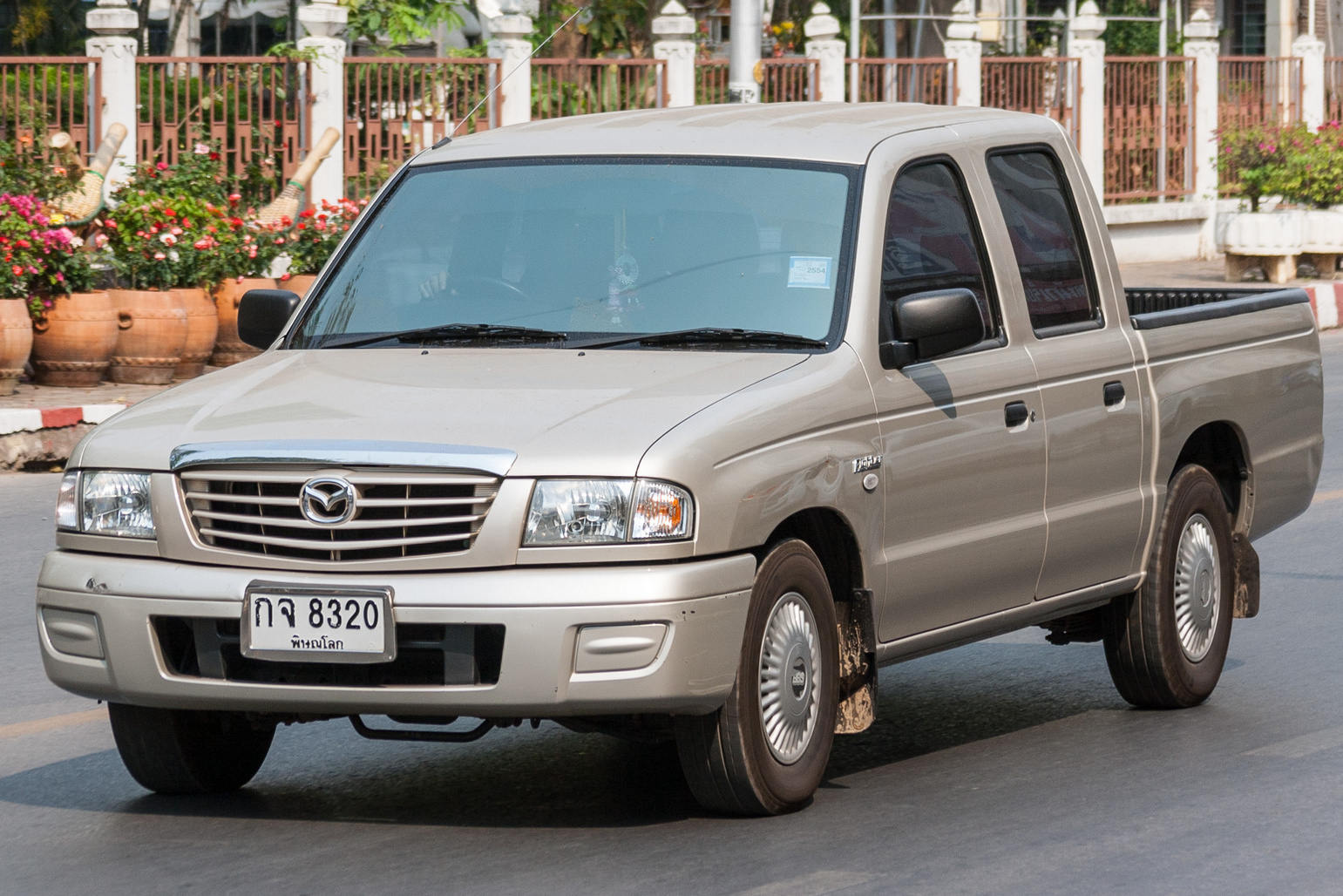
Mazda Fighter (Thailand, facelift)

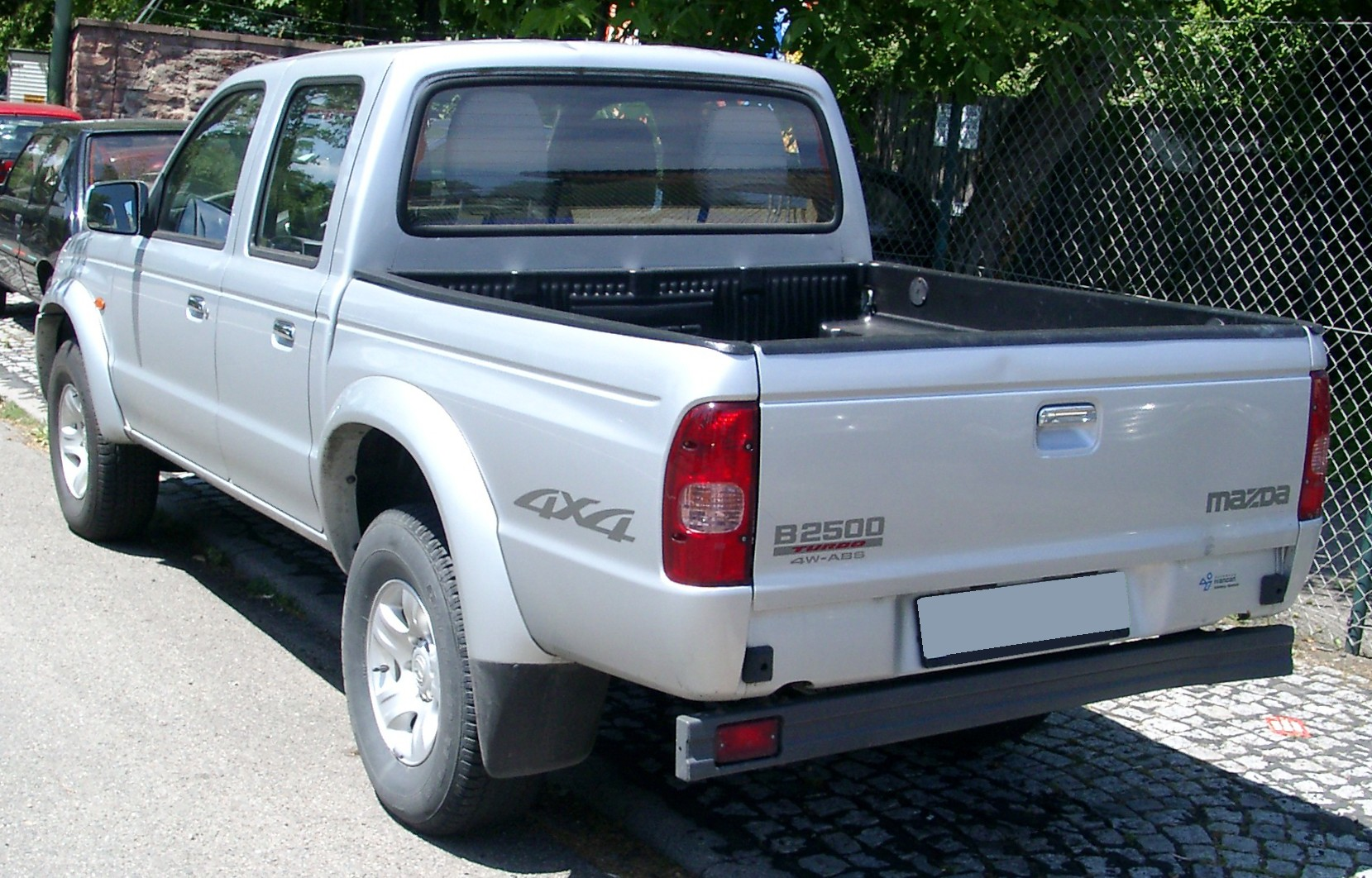
Mazda B2500 (rear view, facelift)

=== Ford Courier / Ranger ===
From 1998 to 2006, Mazda-badge another Ford Courier and new Ford Ranger are badgering. Like a Mazda version of Proceed/B-Series/Ranger/Courier.

== Ford-produced vehicles ==
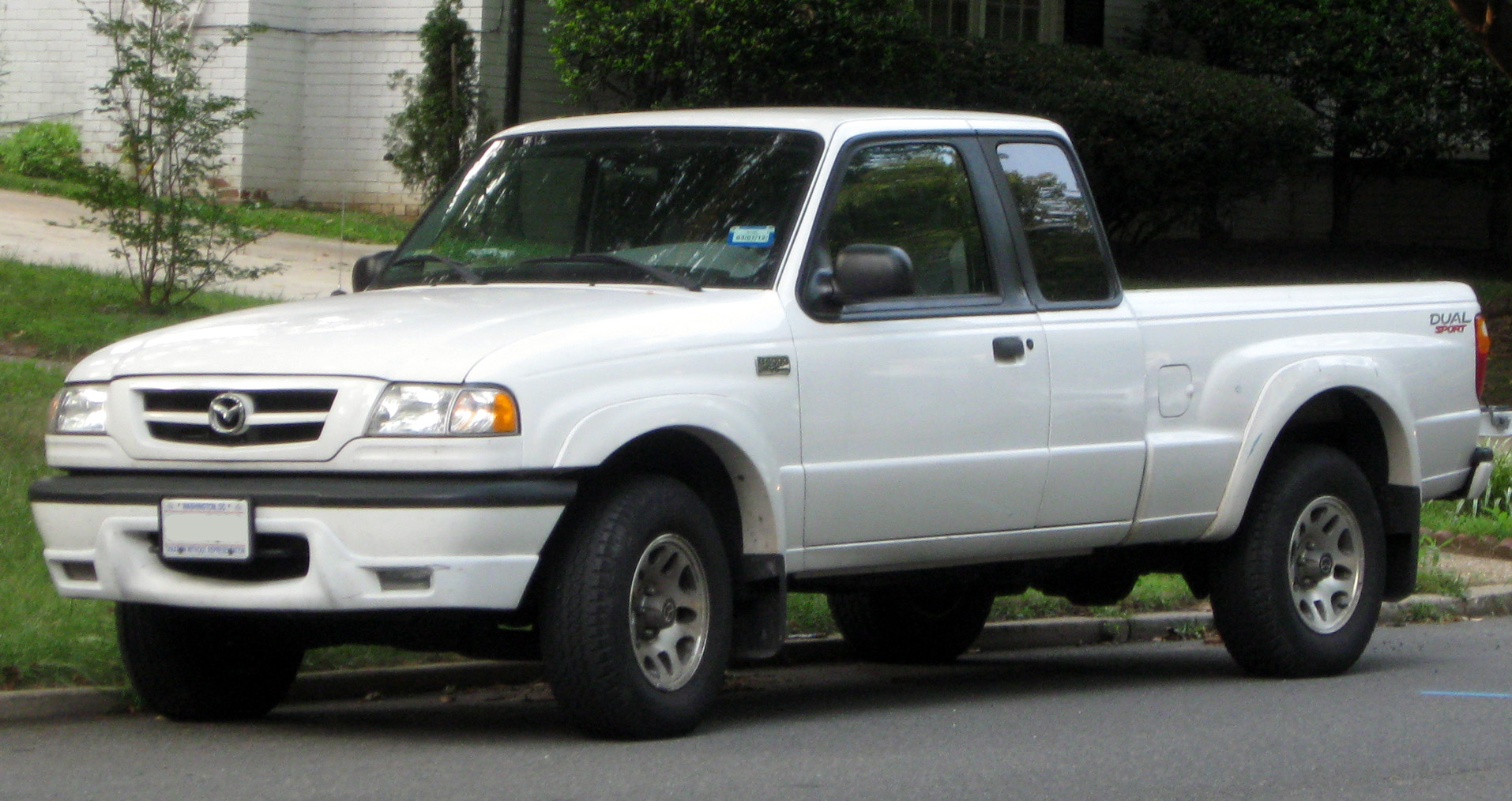
2002–2009 Mazda Truck B4000 extended cab

For the 1994 model year, Mazda North America ended sales of the fourth-generation (UF) B-Series, replacing the model line with a Mazda-badged version of the Ford Ranger. In an agreement with Ford, Mazda marketed a B-Series that was produced alongside the Ranger in Ford Twin Cities Assembly (St. Paul, Minnesota), essentially the reverse of how the 1972–1982 Ford Courier was sourced. The 1994 B-series was the second Mazda light truck assembled by Ford, following the 1991-1994 Mazda Navajo (a three-door Ford Explorer).

In shifting the production of the model line from Japan to Minnesota, Mazda was able to entirely circumvent the 25% "chicken tax" applied to light trucks, leading to multiple Japanese manufacturers relocating light-truck production to the United States.

After struggling to establish market share in North America during the 1980s against Toyota and Nissan, Mazda shifted the design of the B-series to the highest-selling model line of its segment. Sharing identical mechanical underpinnings with the Ranger, the American-produced B-Series maintained a high degree of visual similarity with its Ford counterpart, though the Mazda was styled with distinct body panels for the front fascia and pickup truck bed; extended cabs were distinguished with separate exterior trim.

Through its production, the Ford-produced B-Series followed the development of the Ranger in its body and chassis, undergoing a substantial update for the 1998 model year. For 2002, Mazda renamed the B-Series as the Mazda Truck in North America. As the 2000s progressed, the Mazda Truck was gradually phased out of the Mazda product range and was ultimately discontinued after 2009 in the United States (2010 in Canada); the final vehicle was produced on December 11, 2009.

As of current production, Mazda North America has no current plans to market the Mazda BT-50 in North America.
