= Proceed =

Proceed may refer to:

- Proceeds, the total amount of income generated by the sale of goods and services
- Kia Proceed, a 2019–present South Korean compact shooting brake
- Mazda Proceed, a 1966–2006 Japanese pickup truck
