= Mazda K360 =

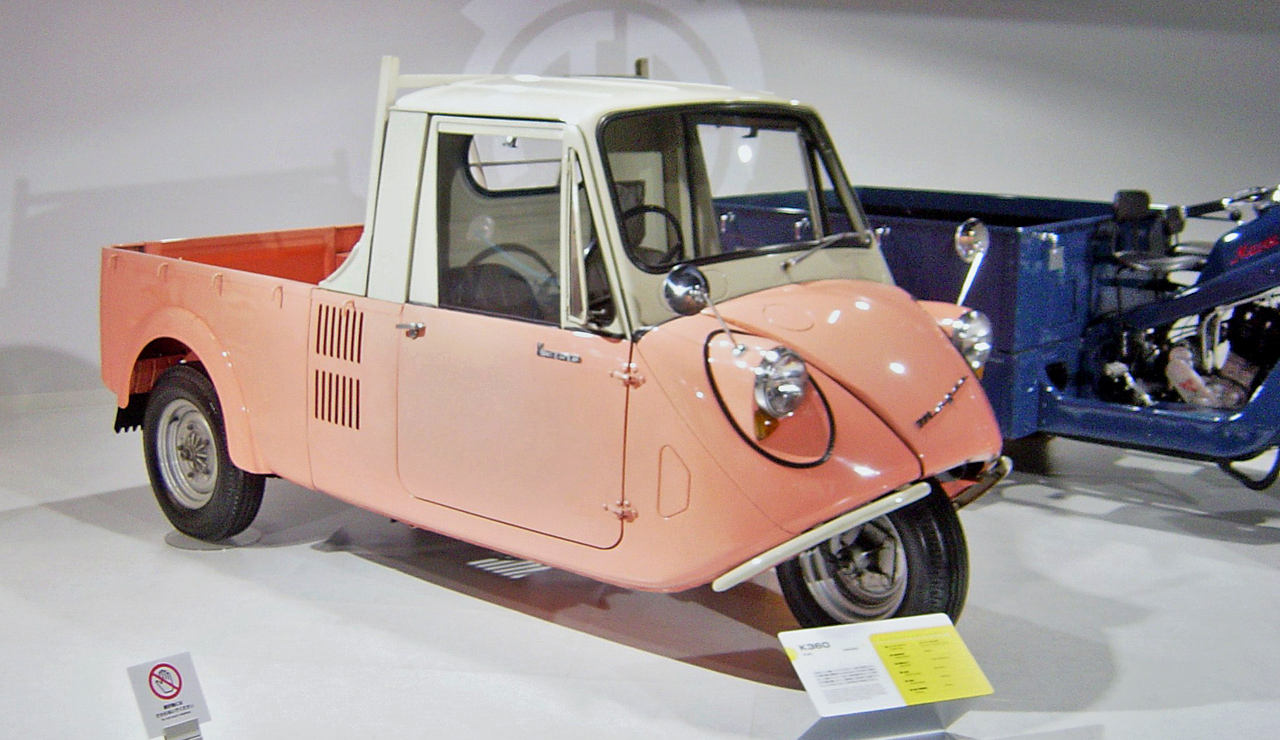

The Mazda K360 (Japanese: マツダ・K360) is a three-wheeled light truck made by Mazda. It first went on sale in 1959 in Japan. Production ended in 1969. In total, 280,000 vehicles were produced. It was the replacement for the Mazda-Go.

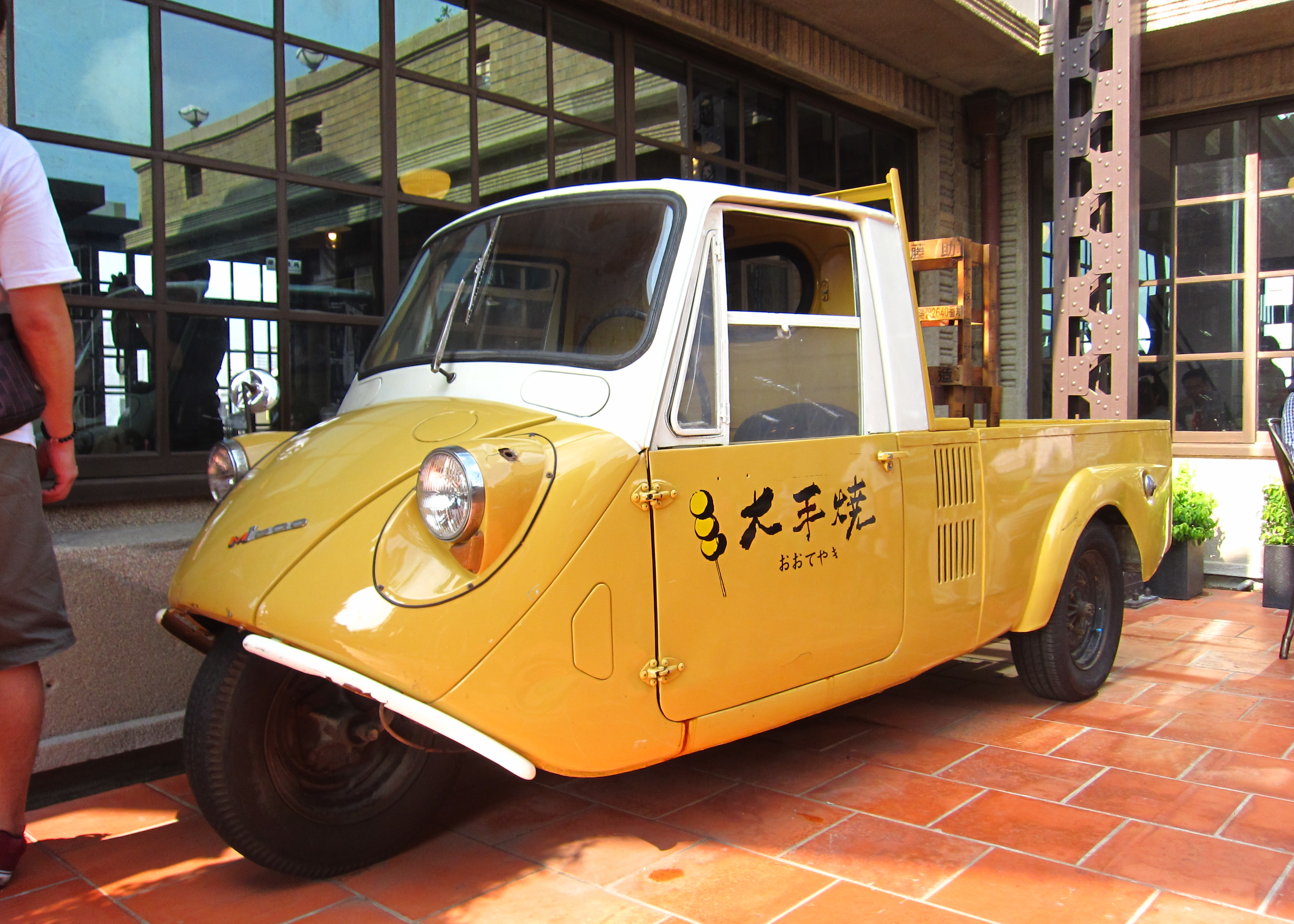
Mazda K360

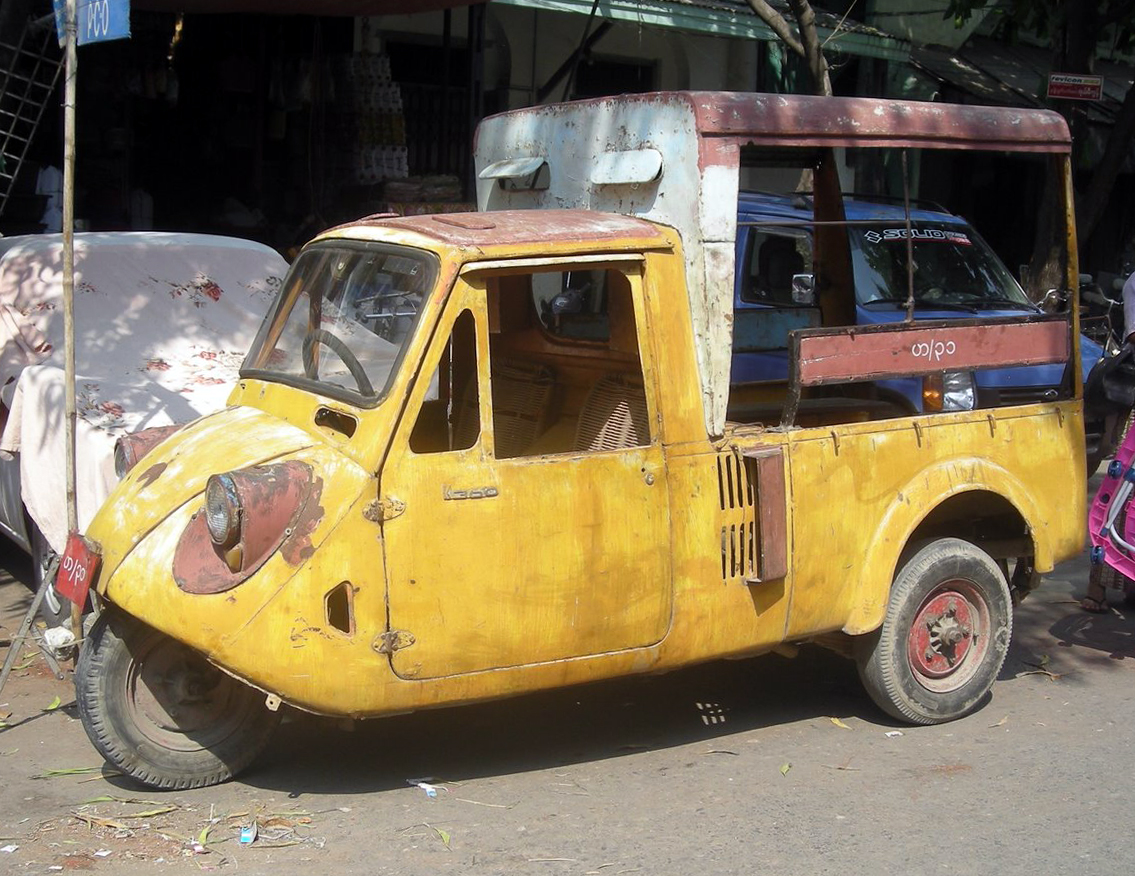
Mazda K360 Burma

The vehicle is 2.975 metres (9.76 ft) in length, 1.28 metres (4.2 ft) wide, 1.43 metres (4.7 ft) tall, weighs 485 kilograms (1,069 lb), and has a top speed of 65 km/h (40 mph).
