= Mazda-Go =

Type of Three-wheeled open truck

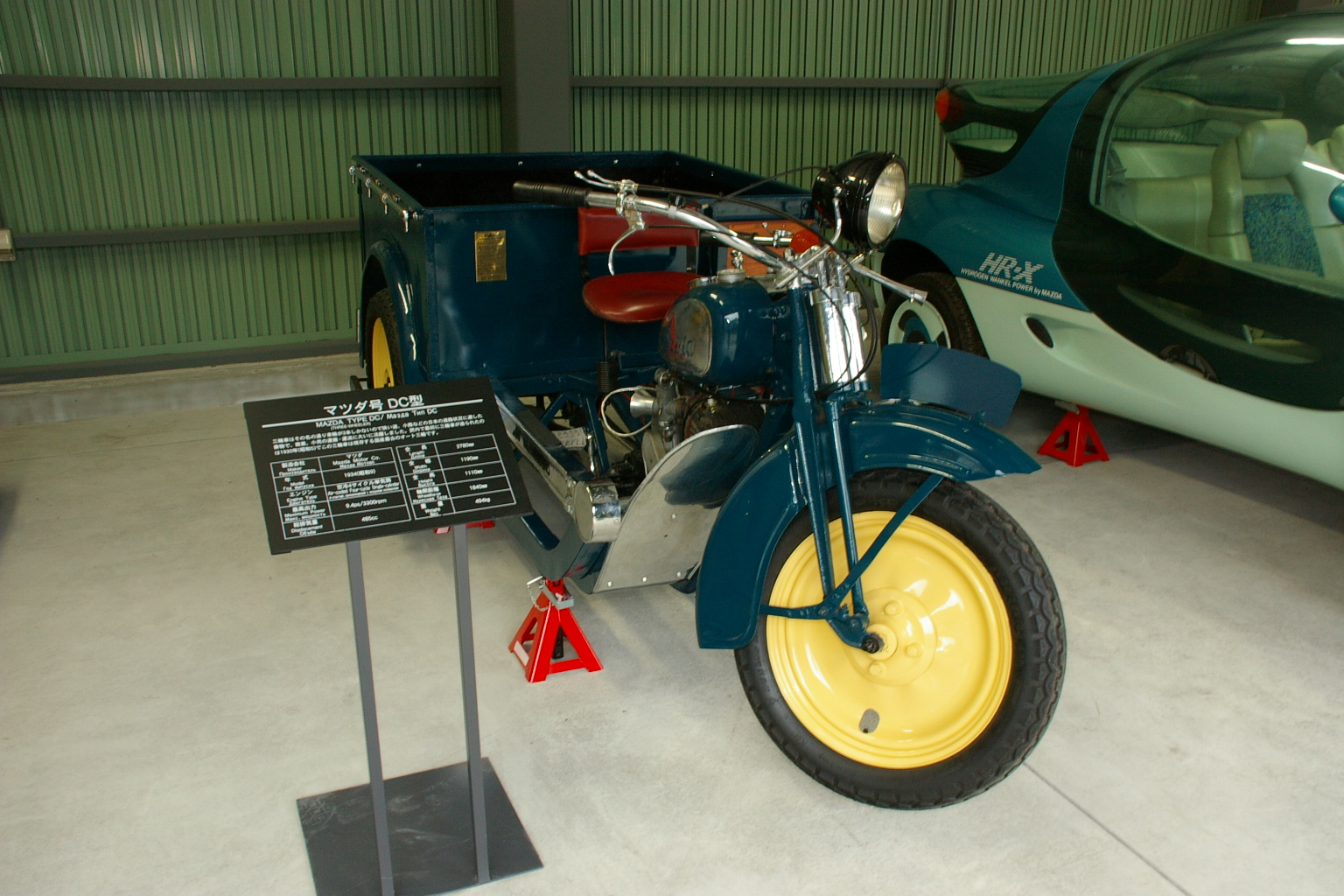
- Mazda-Go DC model

Overview
- Manufacturer: Mazda
- Production: 1931–1938

Body and chassis
- Class: Auto rickshaw

Powertrain
- Engine: 482 cc (29.4 cu in) air-cooled single-cylinder; 669 cc (40.8 cu in) air-cooled single-cylinder

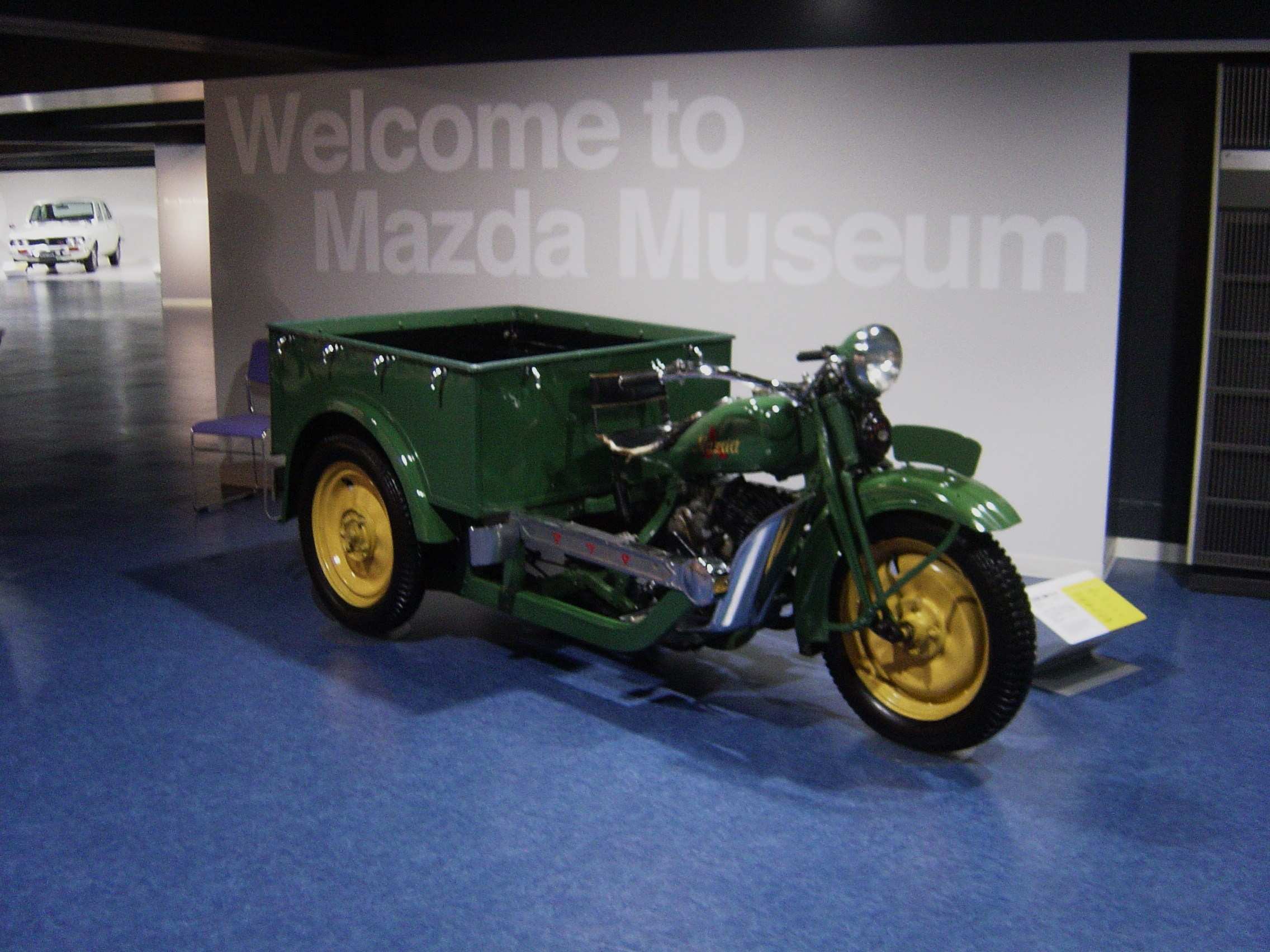
1935 Mazda-Go TCS model

The Mazda-Go (Japanese: マツダ号) is a three-wheeled truck that was first produced in 1931, being the first vehicle manufactured by Mazda. It has also been considered to be the first auto rickshaw built, although the Daihatsu HB debuted in the same year.

== Design ==
Resembling a motorcycle with an open wagon or truck bed, the Mazda-Go is steered using handlebars and powered by an air-cooled single-cylinder engine. The in-house-developed engine displaced 482 cc (29.4 cu in) and produced 9.4 PS (6.9 kW), powering the rear wheels through a three-speed transmission. Notable refinements included a rear differential and a reverse gear. The original model was designated the DA, with the "Mazda-Go" brand name being used to sell it and subsequent generations. A more powerful version called the DB soon appeared, followed by a number of other Mazda-Go models like the DC and the heavier-duty KC.

The last version to appear before World War II was the 1938 GA, which re-entered production in December 1945 as Mazda's first post-war product. The GA has a 669 cc (40.8 cu in) single-cylinder sidevalve engine producing 13.7 PS (10.1 kW) and a maximum cargo load of 500 kg (1,100 lb), while it itself weighs 580 kg (1,280 lb).

== History ==
The Mazda-Go entered the market on 3 October 1931. Development had begun in 1929, a year after Mazda's first trial production run of motorcycles. After a July 1931 agreement, the Mazda-Go was sold by the Mitsubishi zaibatsu in Japan and later on in export markets as well. Mitsubishi retained the distribution rights in Japan until August 1936 and for export sales until December 1937.

Over the years, the Mazda-Go range would be produced in different variants, spawning other similar designs such as the HopeStar SM and Daihatsu Midget. It was replaced in the post-war era by a new range of three-wheeled Mazda trucks, including the K360 and the T2000.
